= Outline of Greece =

Country in the Balkan Peninsula in Southern Europe

The Flag of Greece

The Coat of arms of Greece

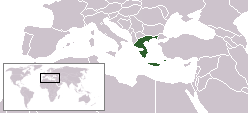
The location of Greece

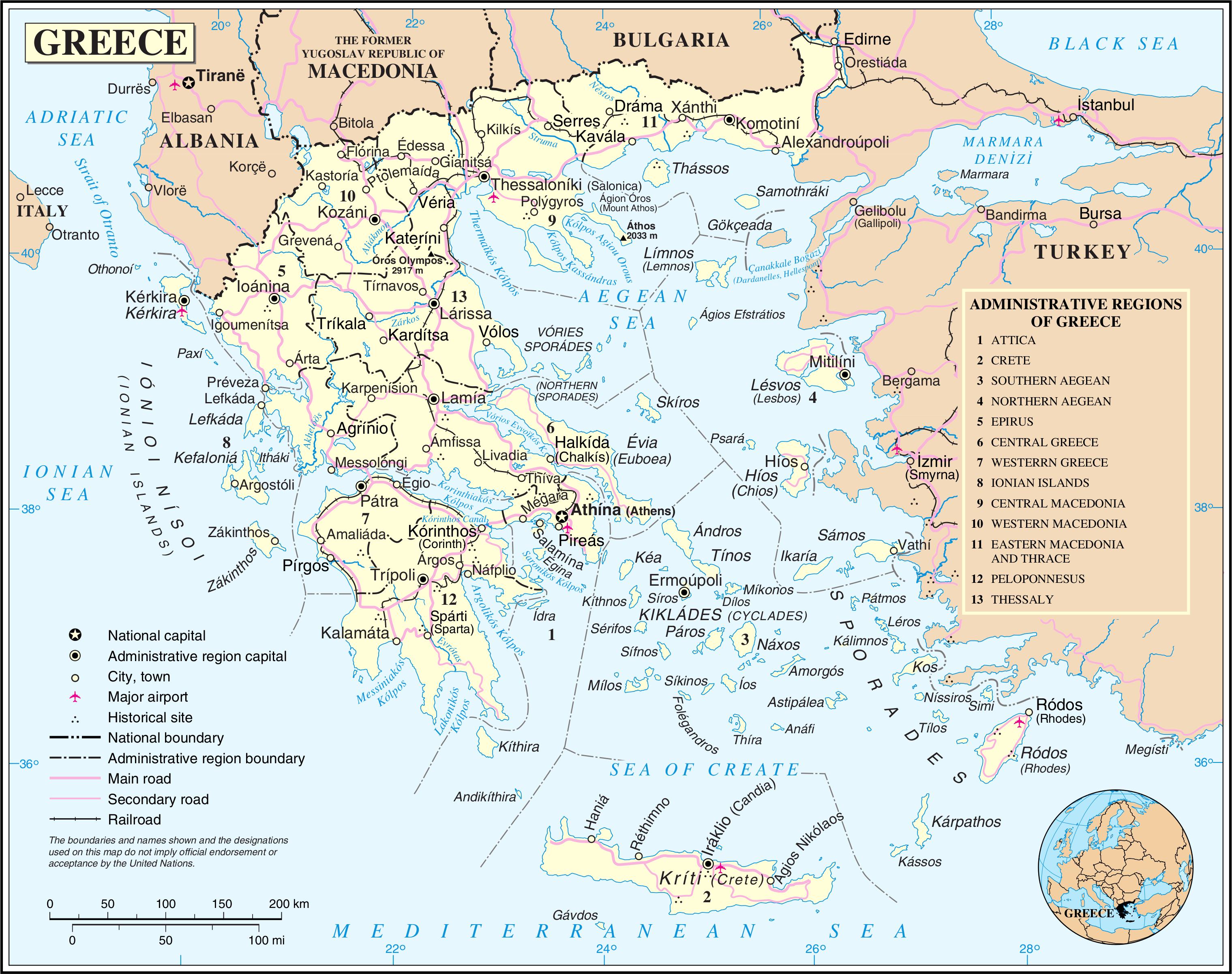
An enlargeable map of Greece

The following outline is provided as an overview of and topical guide to Greece:

Greece – sovereign country located on the southern end of the Balkan Peninsula in Southern Europe. It borders Albania, Bulgaria, and North Macedonia to the north, and Turkey to the east. The Aegean Sea lies to the east and south of mainland Greece, while the Ionian Sea lies to the west. Both parts of the Eastern Mediterranean basin feature a vast number of islands.

Greece lies at the juncture of Europe, Asia and Africa. It is heir to the heritages of ancient Greece, the Roman and Byzantine Empires, and nearly four centuries of Ottoman rule. Greece is the birthplace of democracy, Western philosophy, the Olympic Games (for this reason, unless it is the host nation, it always leads the Parade of Nations in accordance with tradition begun at the 1928 Amsterdam Olympics), Western literature and historiography, political science, major scientific and mathematical principles, and Western drama including both tragedy and comedy.

Greece is a developed country, a member of the European Union since 1981, a member of the Economic and Monetary Union of the European Union since 2001, NATO since 1952, the OECD since 1961, the WEU since 1995 and ESA since 2005. Athens is the capital; Thessaloniki, Patras, Heraklion, Volos, Ioannina, Larissa and Kavala are some of the country's other major cities.

== General reference ==
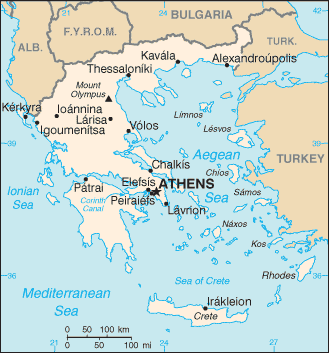
An enlargeable basic map of Greece

- Pronunciation: /ˈɡriːs/
- Common English country name: Greece
- Official English country name: The Hellenic Republic
- Common endonym(s): Ελλάς (Ellas, archaic); Ελλάδα (Ellada)
- Official endonym(s): Ελληνική Δημοκρατία (Elliniki Dimokratia)
- Adjectives: Greek, Grecian, Hellenic
- Demonym: Greek
- Etymology: Name of Greece
- International rankings of Greece
- ISO country codes: GR, GRC, 300
- ISO region codes: See ISO 3166-2:GR
- Internet country code top-level domain: .gr

== Geography of Greece ==
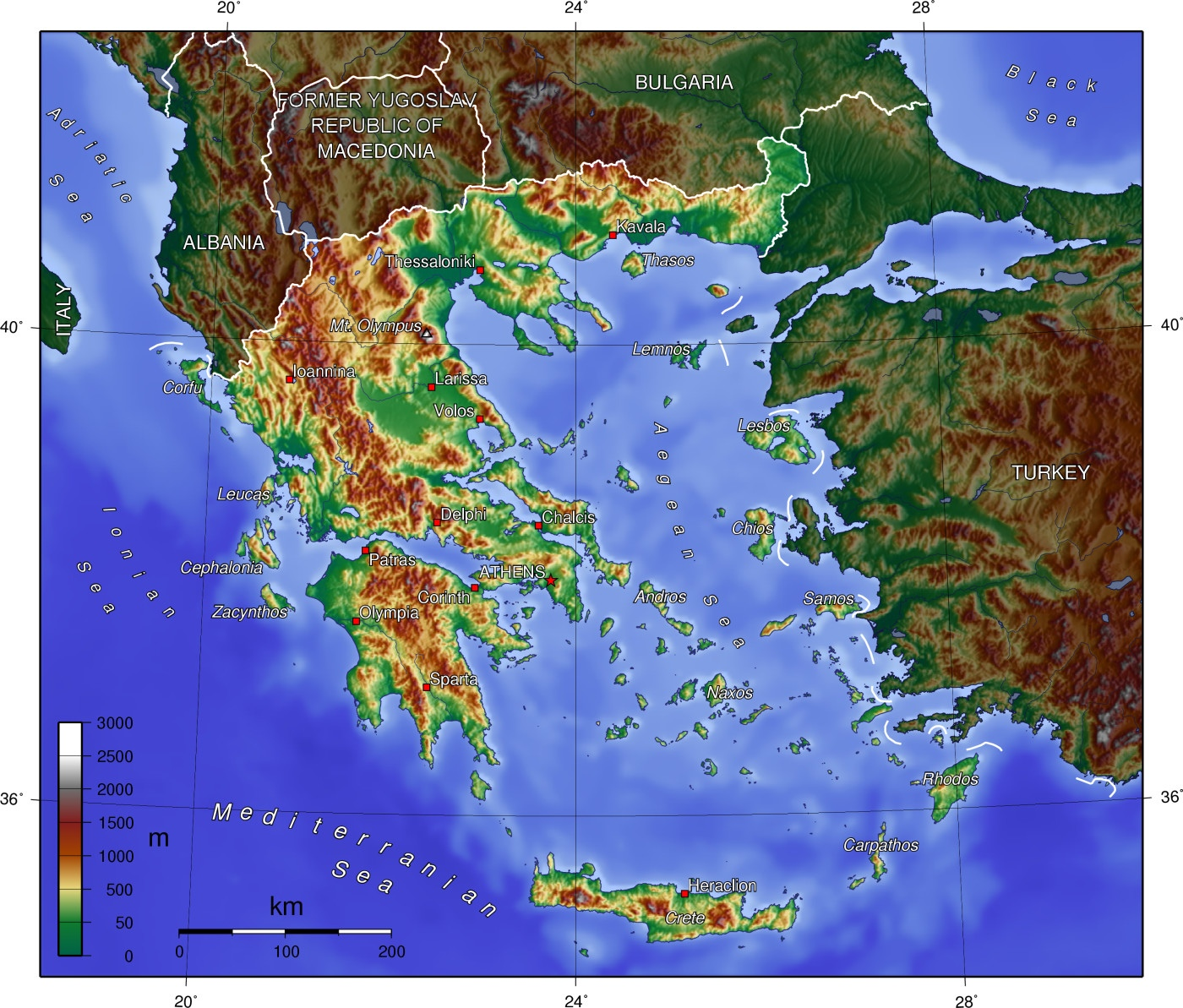
An enlargeable topographic map of Greece

Geography of Greece

- Greece is: a country
- Location:
  - Northern Hemisphere and Eastern Hemisphere
  - Eurasia
    - Europe
      - Southern Europe
        - Balkans (also known as "Southeastern Europe")
  - Time zone: Eastern European Time (UTC+02), Eastern European Summer Time (UTC+03)
  - Extreme points of Greece
    - High: Mount Olympus 2,919 m (9,577 ft)
    - Low: Mediterranean Sea 0 m
  - Land boundaries: 1,228 km

Bulgaria 494 km
Albania 282 km
North Macedonia 246 km
Turkey 206 km

- Coastline: 13,676 km

- Population of Greece: 11,306,183 (January 1, 2010) - 90th most populous country
- Area of Greece: 131,990 km^{2}
- Atlas of Greece

=== Environment of Greece ===
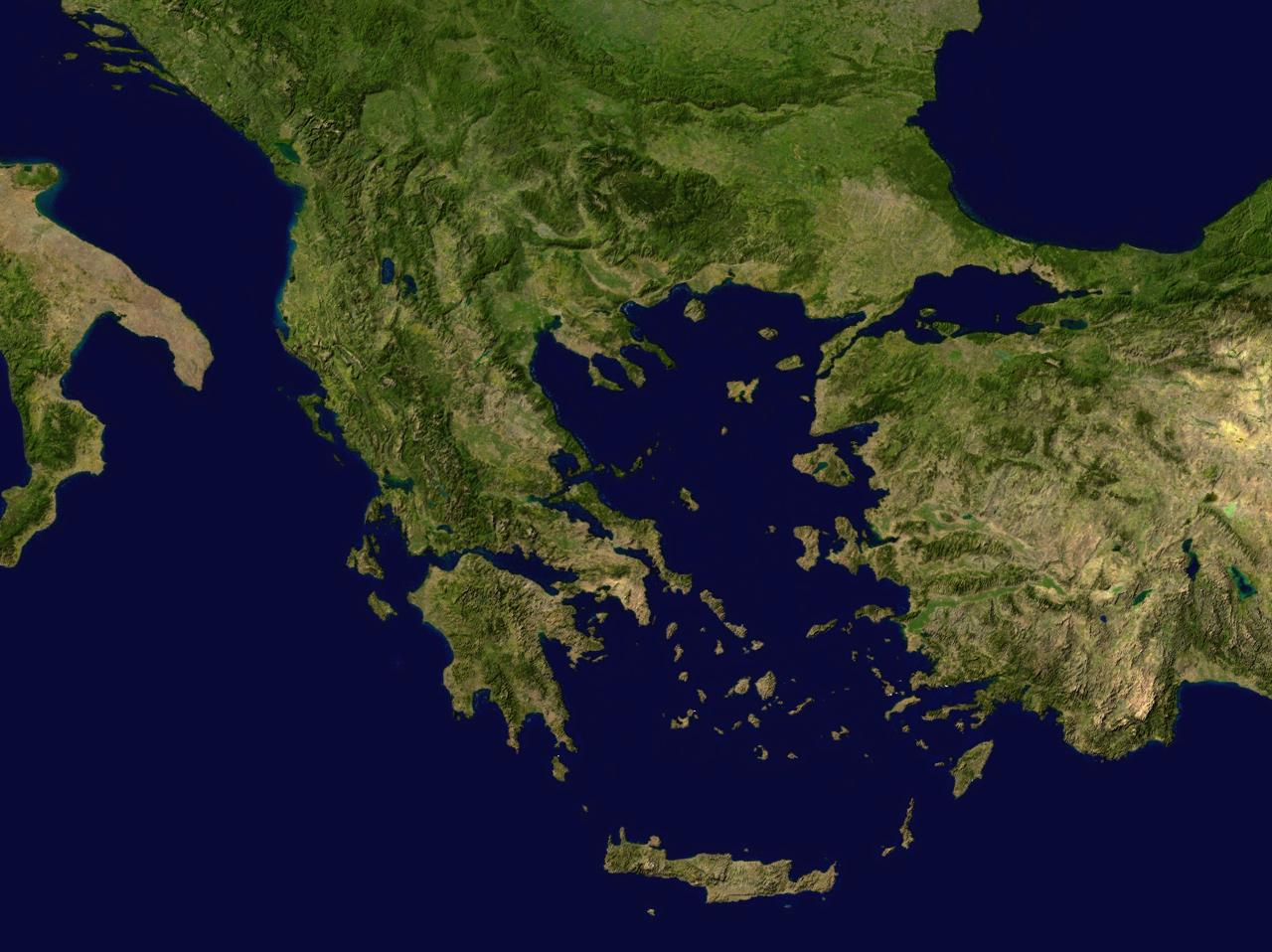
An enlargeable satellite composite image of Greece

Environment of Greece

- Climate of Greece
- Environmental issues in Greece
- Renewable energy in Greece
- Protected areas of Greece
  - National parks of Greece
- Wildlife of Greece
  - Fauna of Greece
    - Birds of Greece
    - Mammals of Greece

==== Natural geographic features of Greece ====
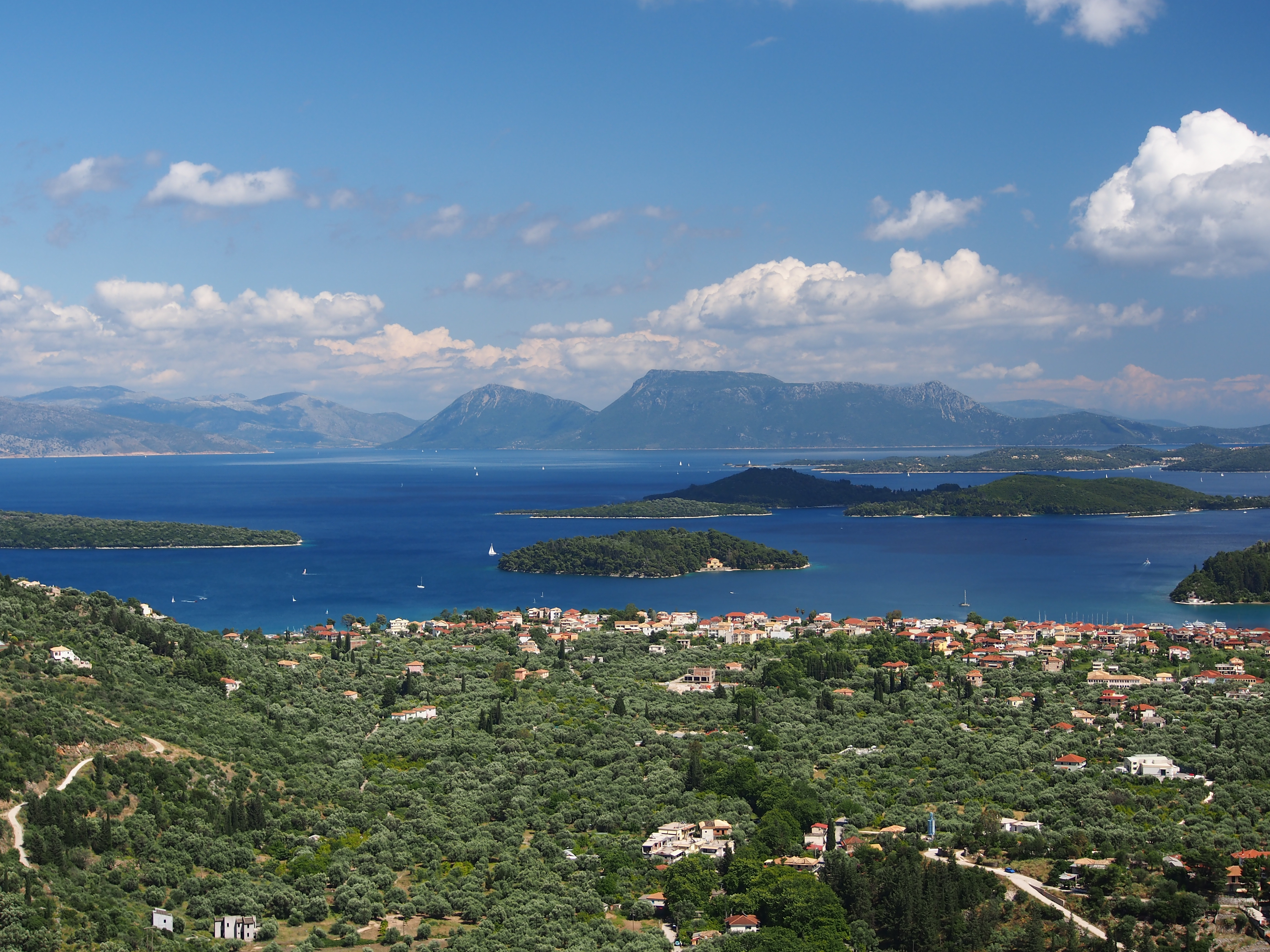
The Ionian Islands

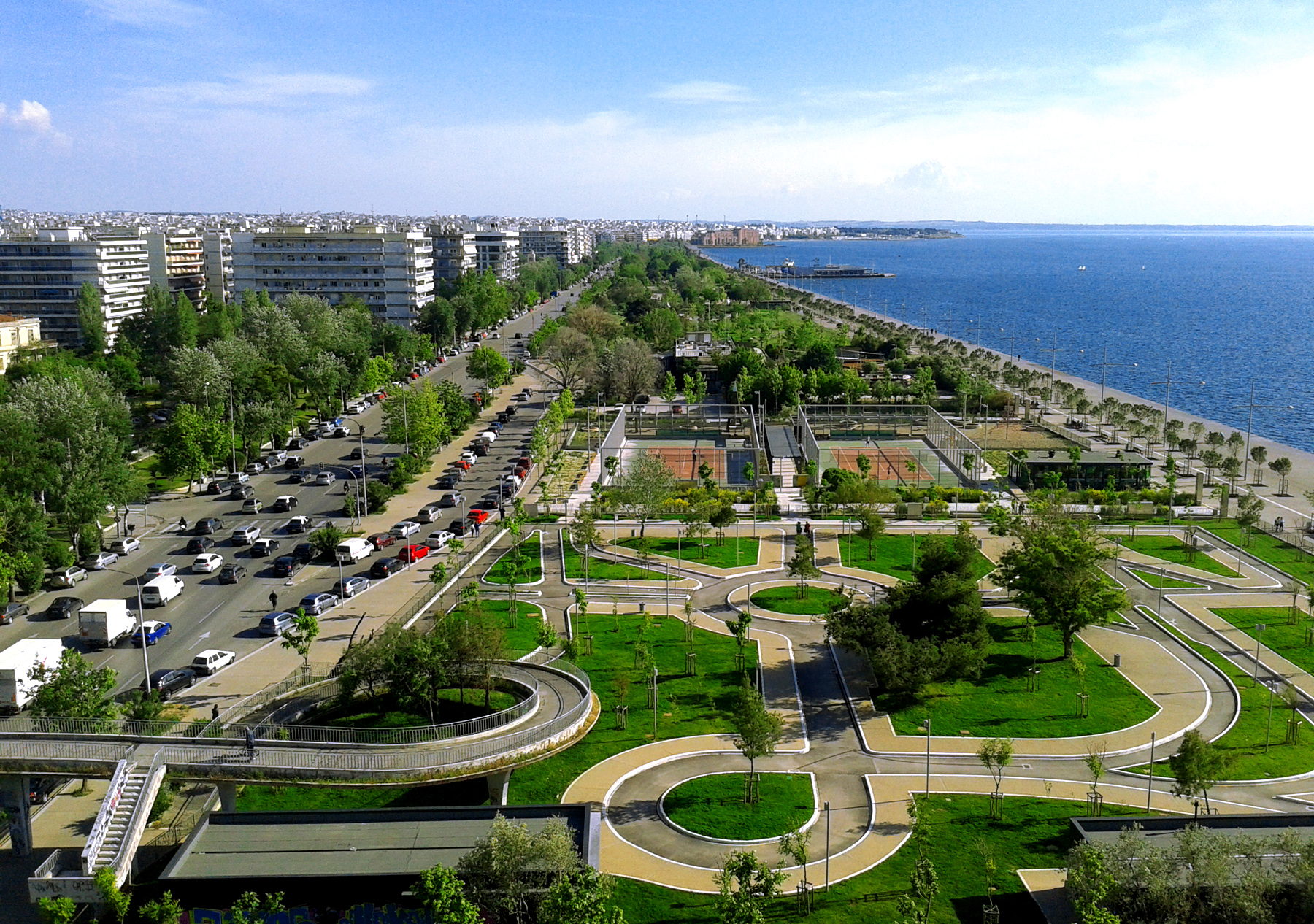
View of Thessaloniki

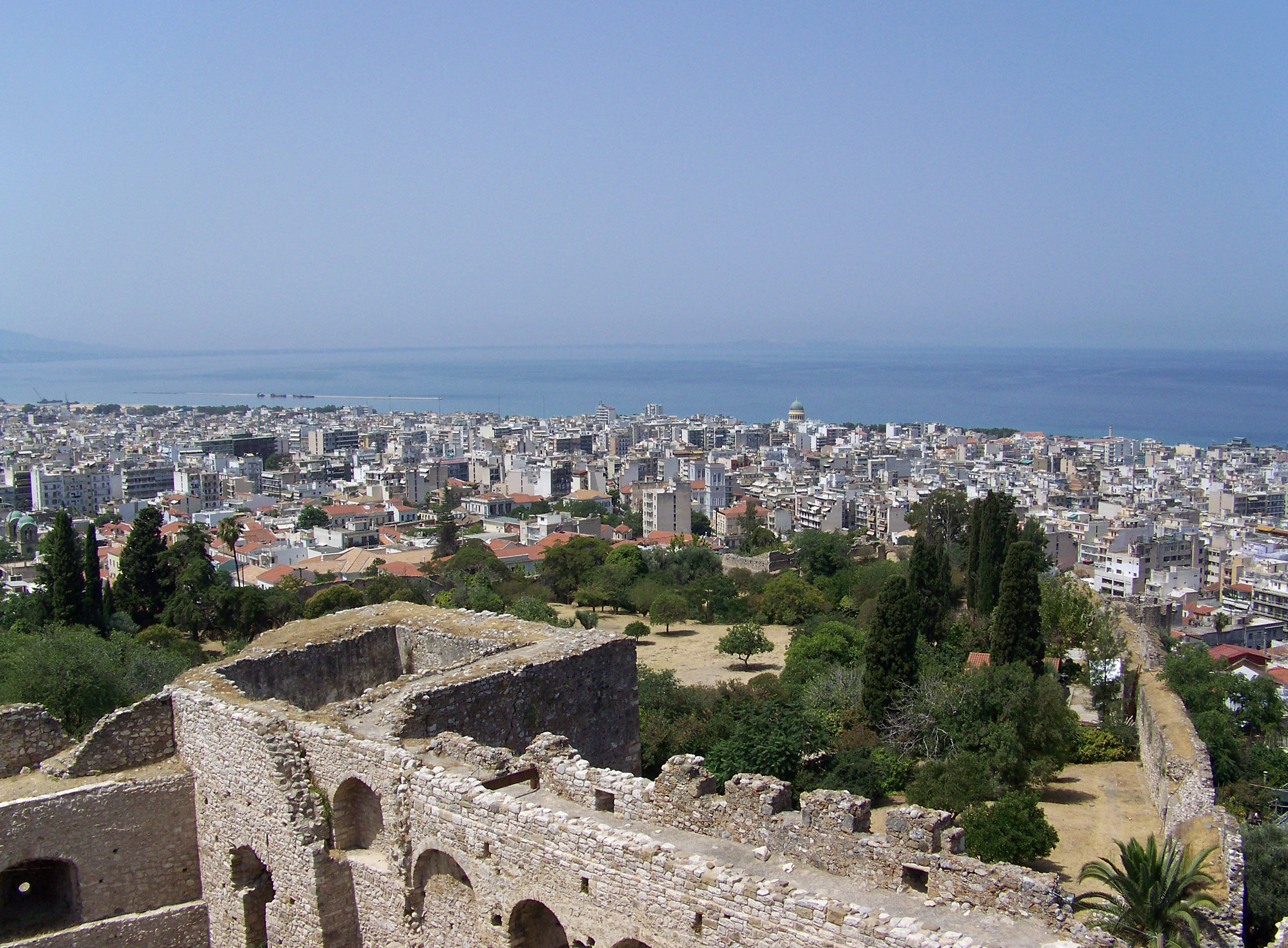
View of Patras from the fortress

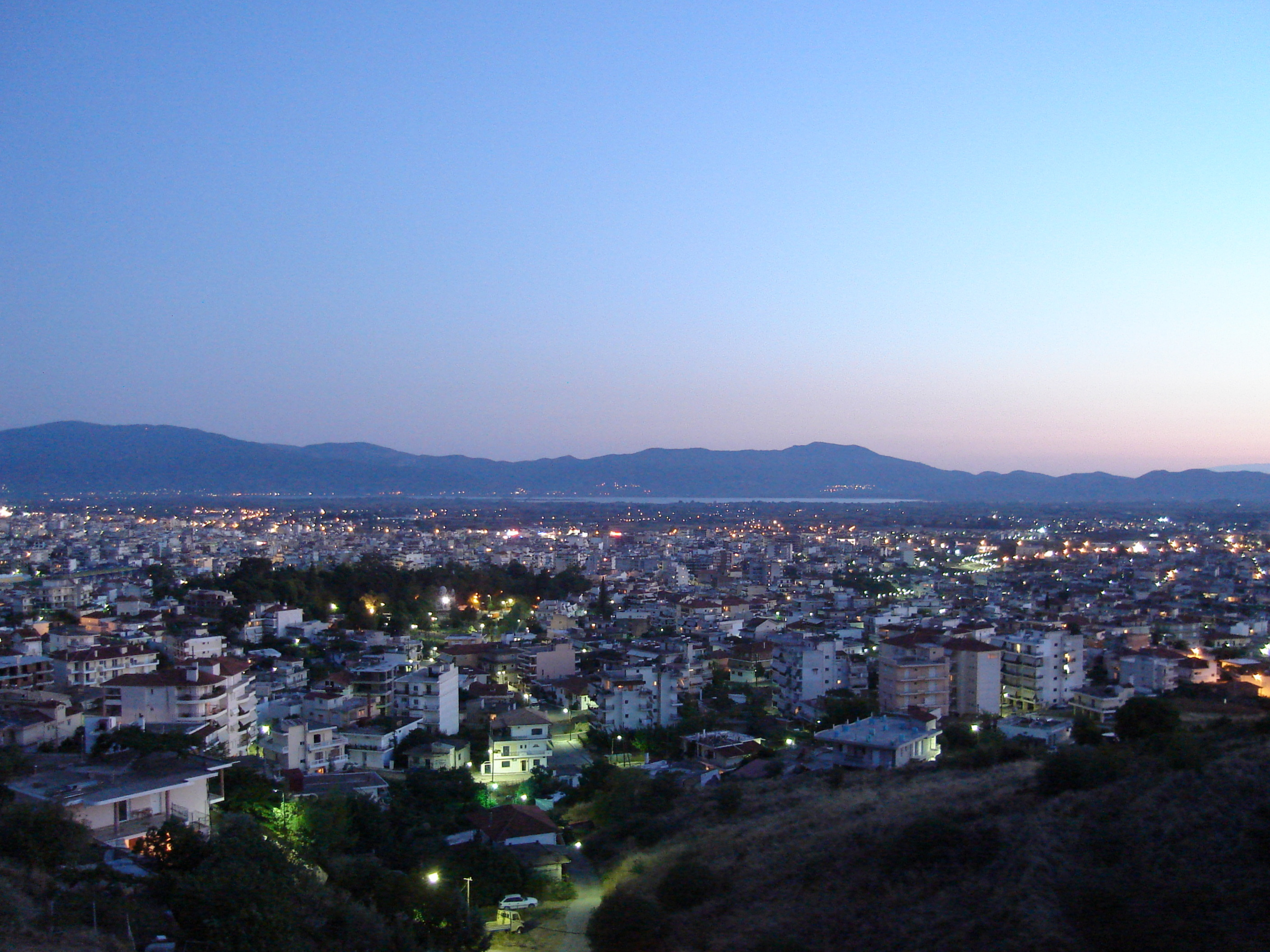
Agrinio

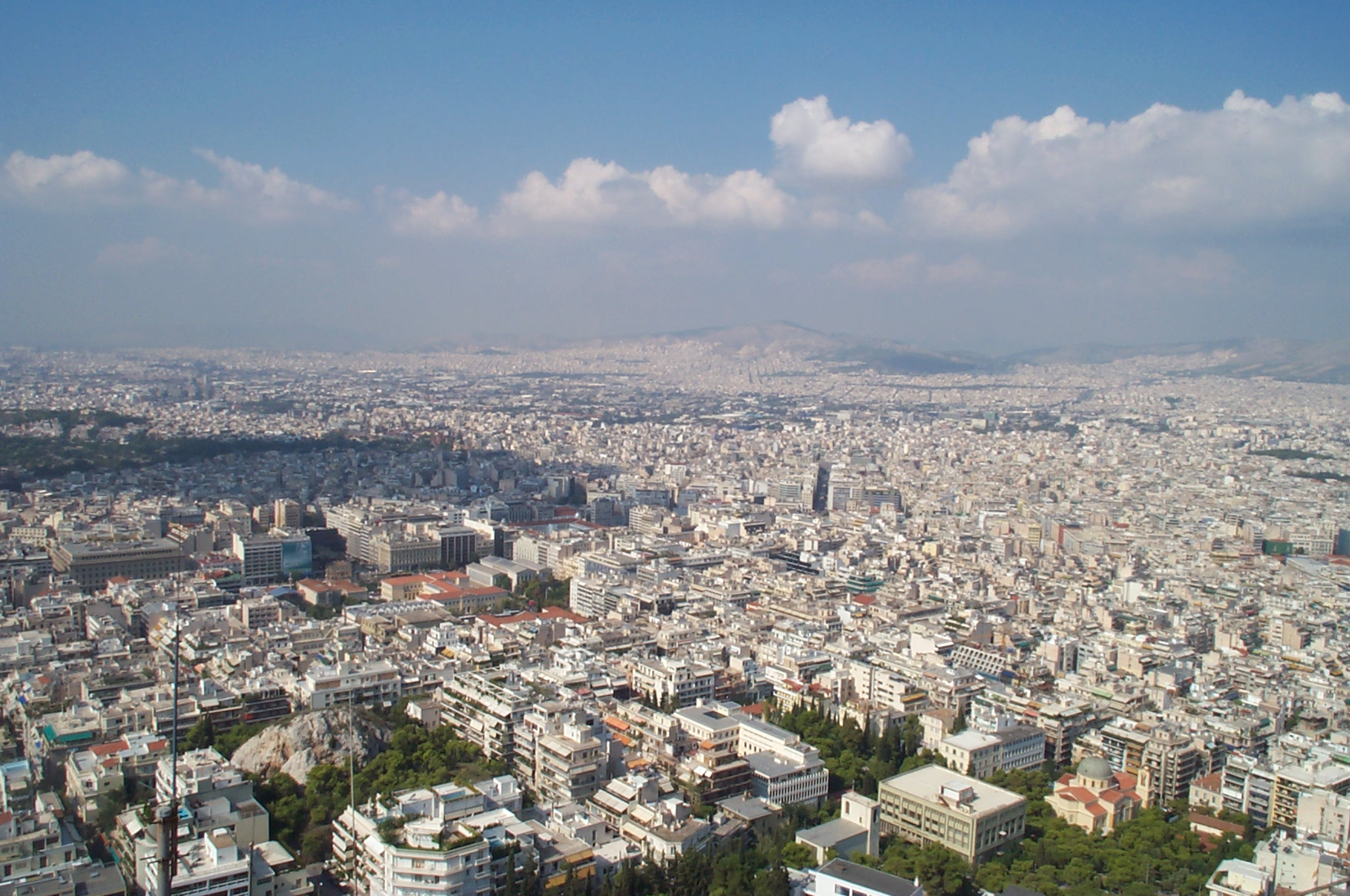
Athens

- Caves in Greece
- Islands of Greece
- Lakes of Greece
- Mountains of Greece
  - Volcanoes in Greece
- Rivers of Greece
- List of World Heritage Sites in Greece

=== Regions of Greece ===
==== Ecoregions of Greece ====
List of ecoregions in Greece

==== Administrative divisions of Greece ====
Administrative divisions of Greece

- Administrative regions of Greece
  - Regional units of Greece
    - Municipalities of Greece

===== Administrative regions of Greece =====
Modern regions of Greece

===== Regional units of Greece =====
Regional units of Greece

===== Municipalities of Greece =====
Municipalities and communities of Greece

- Capital of Greece: Athens (outline)
- Cities of Greece

==== Traditional geographic divisions of Greece ====
Traditional geographic divisions of Greece

=== Demography of Greece ===
Demographics of Greece

- Demographic history of Greece

== Government and politics of Greece ==
Politics of Greece

- Form of government: parliamentary representative democratic republic
- Capital of Greece: Athens
- Elections in Greece
  - Next Greek legislative election
- Greek government-debt crisis
  - Greek government-debt crisis timeline
    - Greek austerity packages
- Greek withdrawal from the eurozone
- Political parties in Greece
- Taxation in Greece
  - Tax evasion and corruption in Greece

=== Branches of the government of Greece ===
Government of Greece

==== Executive branch of the government of Greece ====
- Head of state: President of Greece, Katerina Sakellaropoulou
- Head of government: Prime Minister of Greece, Kyriakos Mitsotakis
- Cabinet of Greece

==== Legislative branch of the government of Greece ====
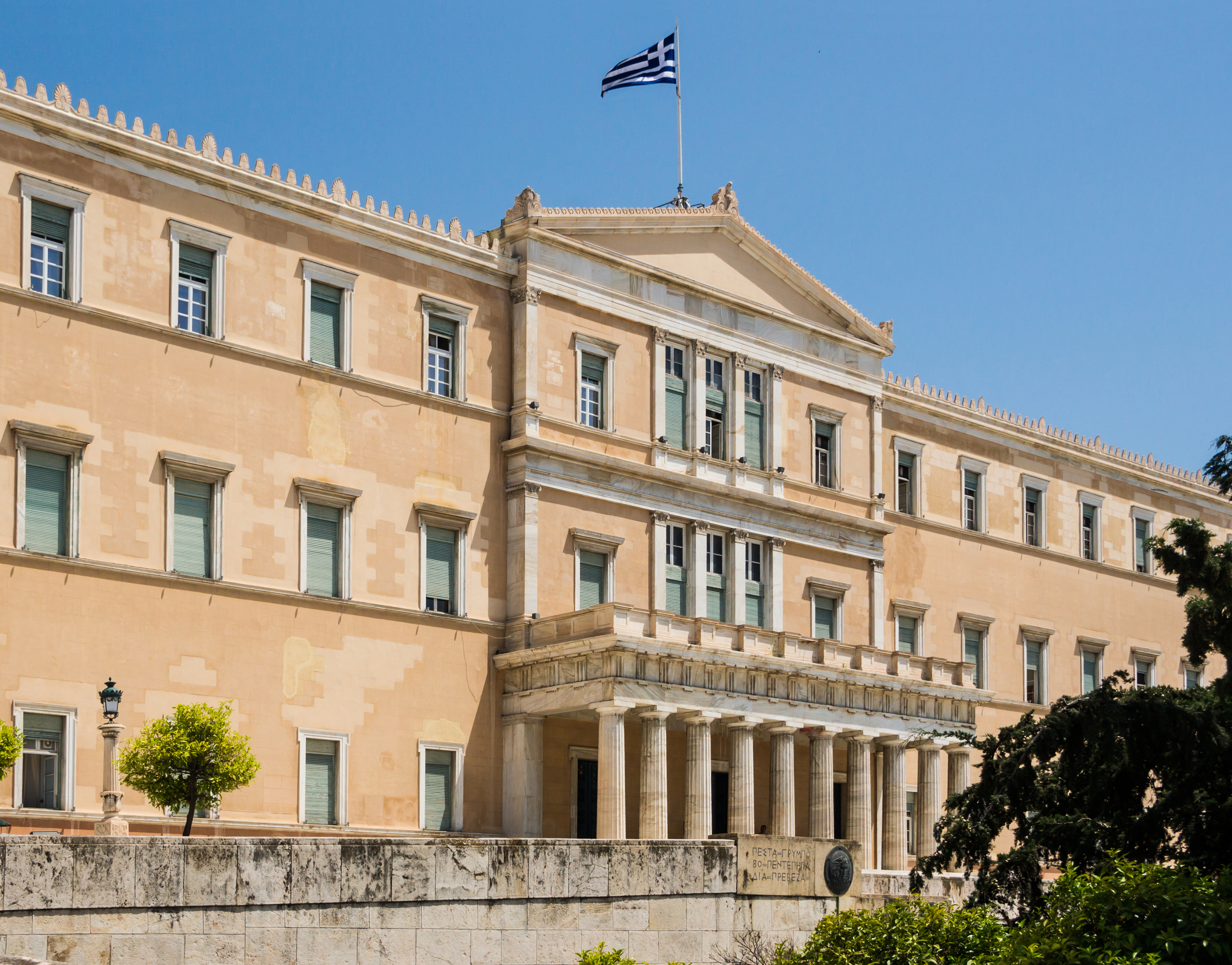
The Old Royal Palace, seat of the Hellenic Parliament

- Hellenic Parliament (unicameral)

==== Judicial branch of the government of Greece ====
Judicial system of Greece There are three Supreme Courts in Greece. They are:

- Court of Cassation (Greek: Άρειος Πάγος)
- Council of State (Greek: Συμβούλιο της Επικρατείας)
- Chamber of Accounts (Greek: Ελεγκτικό Συνέδριο)

=== Foreign relations of Greece ===
Foreign relations of Greece

- Diplomatic missions in Greece
- Diplomatic missions of Greece

==== International organization membership ====
The Hellenic Republic is a member of:

- Australia Group
- Bank for International Settlements (BIS)
- Black Sea Economic Cooperation Zone (BSEC)
- Council of Europe (CE)
- Economic and Monetary Union (EMU)
- Euro-Atlantic Partnership Council (EAPC)
- European Bank for Reconstruction and Development (EBRD)
- European Investment Bank (EIB)
- European Organization for Nuclear Research (CERN)
- European Space Agency (ESA)
- European Union (EU)
- Food and Agriculture Organization (FAO)
- International Atomic Energy Agency (IAEA)
- International Bank for Reconstruction and Development (IBRD)
- International Chamber of Commerce (ICC)
- International Civil Aviation Organization (ICAO)
- International Criminal Court (ICCt)
- International Criminal Police Organization (Interpol)
- International Development Association (IDA)
- International Energy Agency (IEA)
- International Federation of Red Cross and Red Crescent Societies (IFRCS)
- International Finance Corporation (IFC)
- International Fund for Agricultural Development (IFAD)
- International Hydrographic Organization (IHO)
- International Labour Organization (ILO)
- International Maritime Organization (IMO)
- International Mobile Satellite Organization (IMSO)
- International Monetary Fund (IMF)
- International Olympic Committee (IOC)
- International Organization for Migration (IOM)
- International Organization for Standardization (ISO)
- International Red Cross and Red Crescent Movement (ICRM)
- International Telecommunication Union (ITU)
- International Telecommunications Satellite Organization (ITSO)
- International Trade Union Confederation (ITUC)
- Inter-Parliamentary Union (IPU)
- Multilateral Investment Guarantee Agency (MIGA)
- Nonaligned Movement (NAM) (guest)
- North Atlantic Treaty Organization (NATO)
- Nuclear Energy Agency (NEA)
- Nuclear Suppliers Group (NSG)
- Organisation internationale de la Francophonie (OIF)
- Organisation for Economic Co-operation and Development (OECD)
- Organization for Security and Cooperation in Europe (OSCE)
- Organisation for the Prohibition of Chemical Weapons (OPCW)
- Organization of American States (OAS) (observer)
- Permanent Court of Arbitration (PCA)
- Schengen Convention
- Southeast European Cooperative Initiative (SECI)
- United Nations (UN)
- United Nations Conference on Trade and Development (UNCTAD)
- United Nations Educational, Scientific, and Cultural Organization (UNESCO)
- United Nations High Commissioner for Refugees (UNHCR)
- United Nations Industrial Development Organization (UNIDO)
- United Nations Interim Force in Lebanon (UNIFIL)
- United Nations Mission for the Referendum in Western Sahara (MINURSO)
- United Nations Mission in the Sudan (UNMIS)
- United Nations Observer Mission in Georgia (UNOMIG)
- Universal Postal Union (UPU)
- Western European Union (WEU)
- World Customs Organization (WCO)
- World Federation of Trade Unions (WFTU)
- World Health Organization (WHO)
- World Intellectual Property Organization (WIPO)
- World Meteorological Organization (WMO)
- World Tourism Organization (UNWTO)
- World Trade Organization (WTO)
- World Veterans Federation
- Zangger Committee (ZC)

=== Law and order in Greece ===
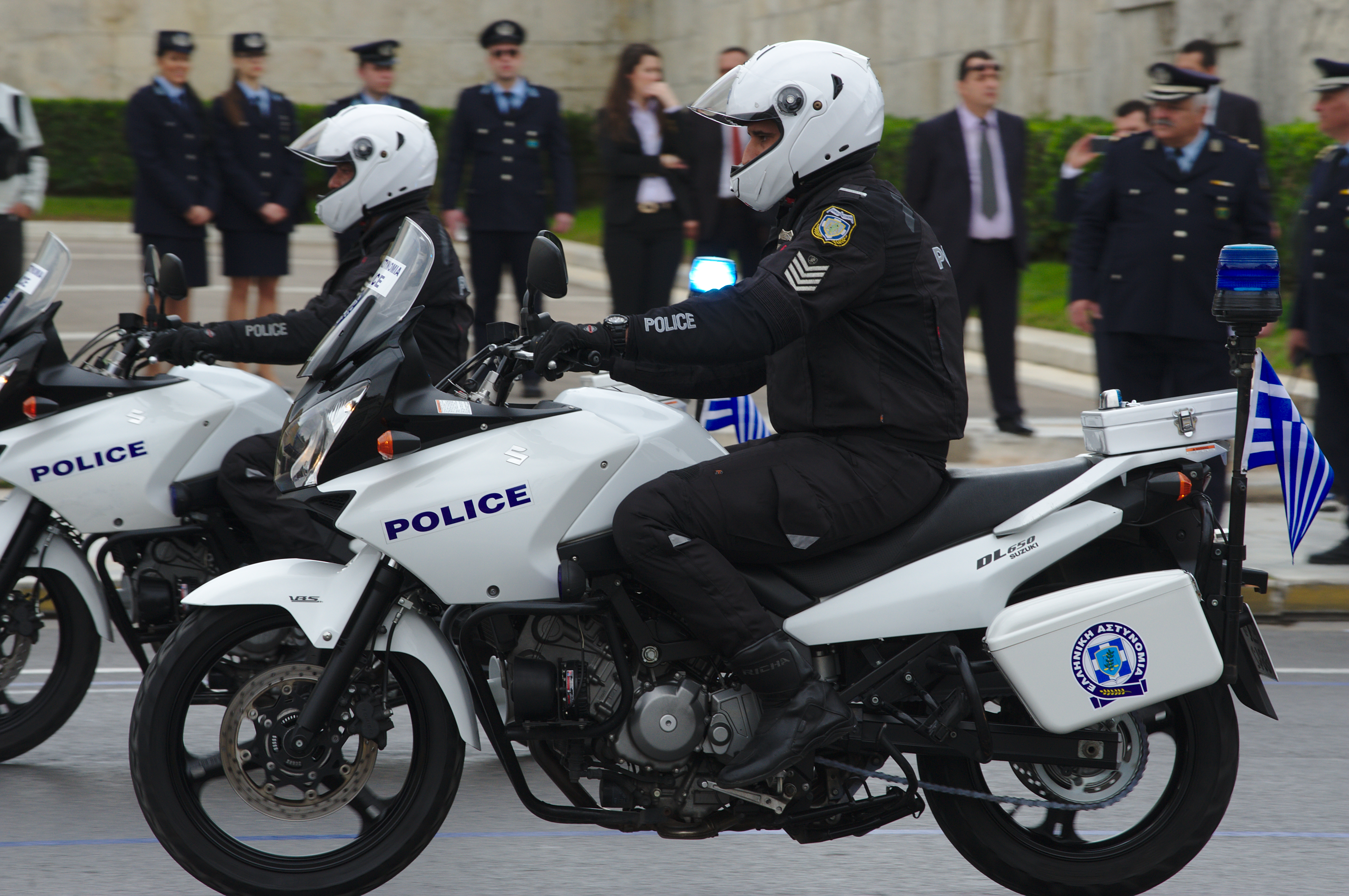
Greek motorcycle police officer in Athens

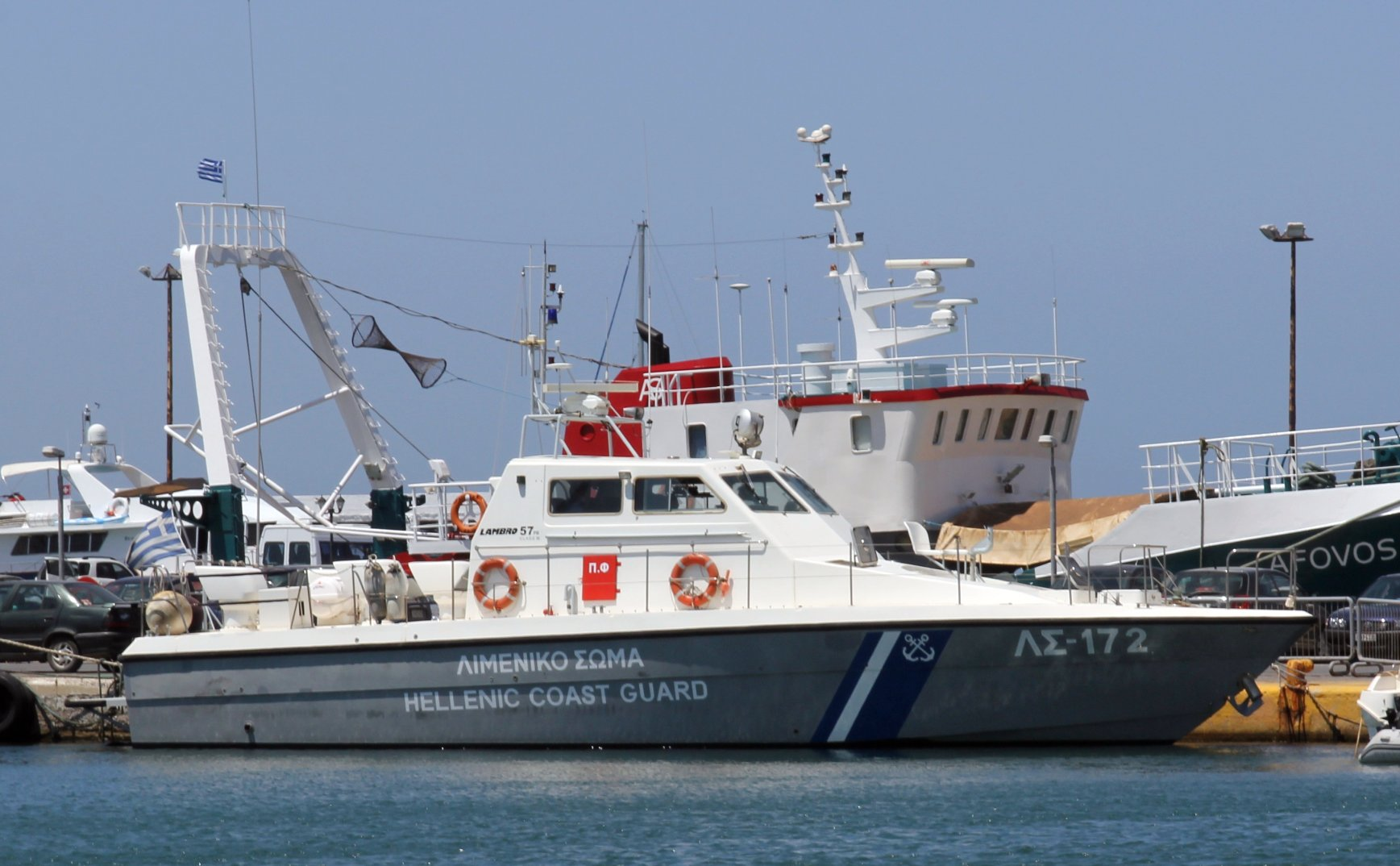
Hellenic Coast Guard: coastal patrol boat ΛΣ-172 type LCS-57 Mk.II at Bay of Zea marina coast guard station, Piraeus

- Law of Greece
  - Capital punishment in Greece
  - Constitution of Greece
  - Copyright law of Greece
  - Greek nationality law
  - Life imprisonment in Greece
- Crime in Greece
  - Human trafficking in Greece
  - Organized crime in Greece
  - Prostitution in Greece
  - Terrorism in Greece
- Human rights in Greece
  - Abortion in Greece
  - LGBT rights in Greece
    - Recognition of same-sex unions in Greece
- Law enforcement in Greece
  - City Police
  - Hellenic Gendarmerie
  - Hellenic Police
    - Cyber Crime Unit
    - Special Anti-Terrorist Unit
    - Units for the Reinstatement of Order

=== Military of Greece ===
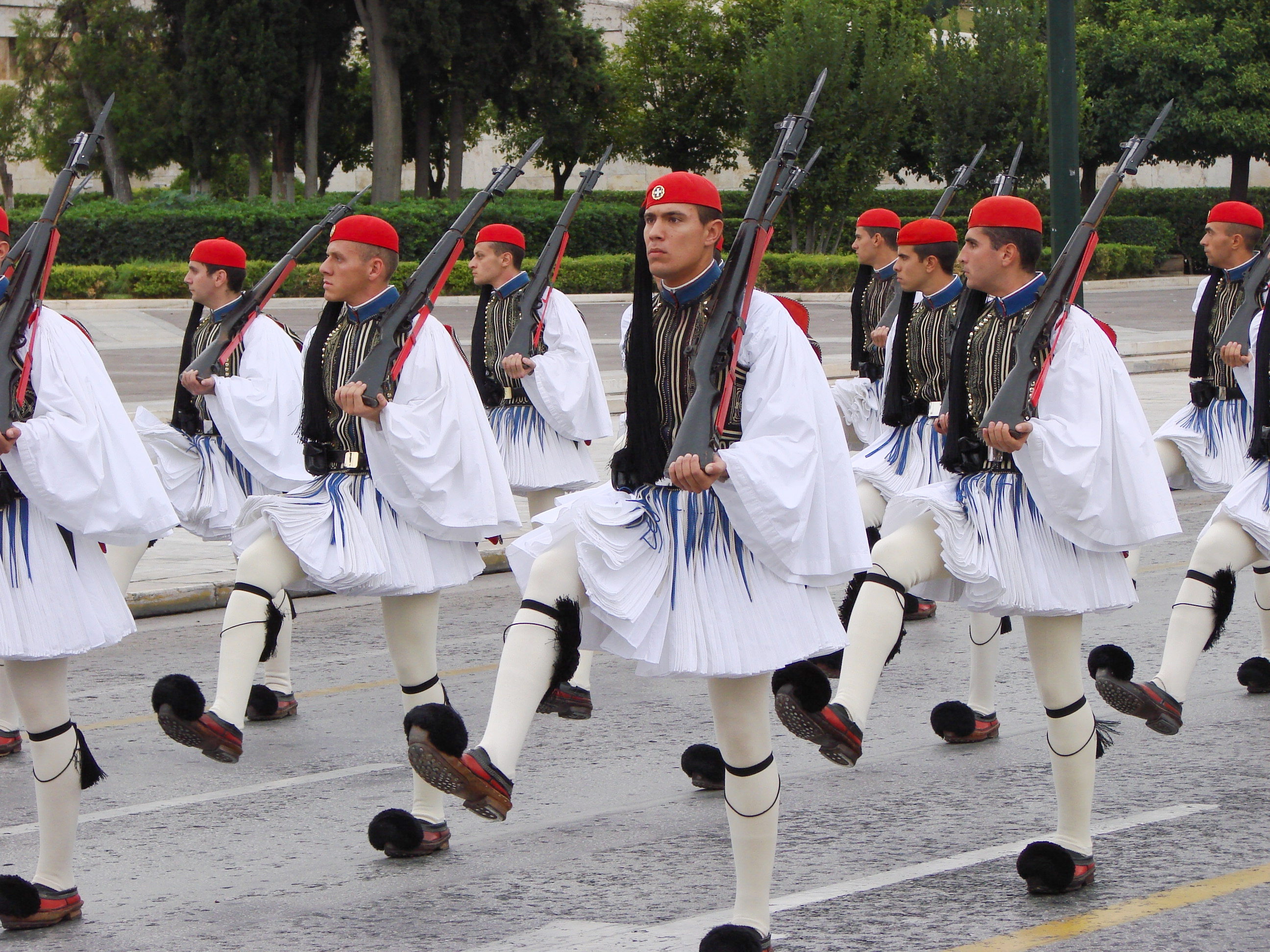
Evzones of the Presidential Guard, Syntagma Square, Athens

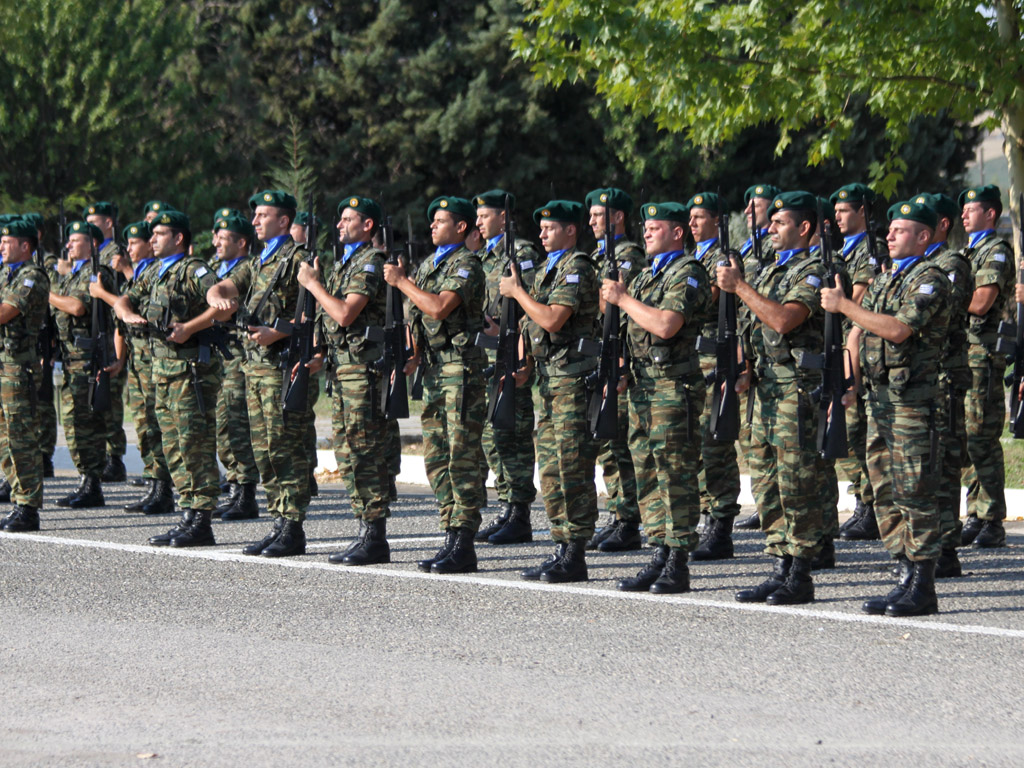
Greek soldiers presenting arms

Hellenic National Defence General Staff Military of Greece

- Command
  - Commander-in-chief: President of Greece
    - Ministry of Defence of Greece
- Forces
  - Army of Greece
  - Navy of Greece
  - Air Force of Greece
  - Presidential Guard
- Conscription in Greece
- Greek Army uniforms
- History of the Hellenic Army
  - Timeline of the Hellenic Army
- Military history of Greece
- Military ranks of Greece
- Structure of the Hellenic Army

=== Local government in Greece ===
Local government in Greece

== History of Greece ==
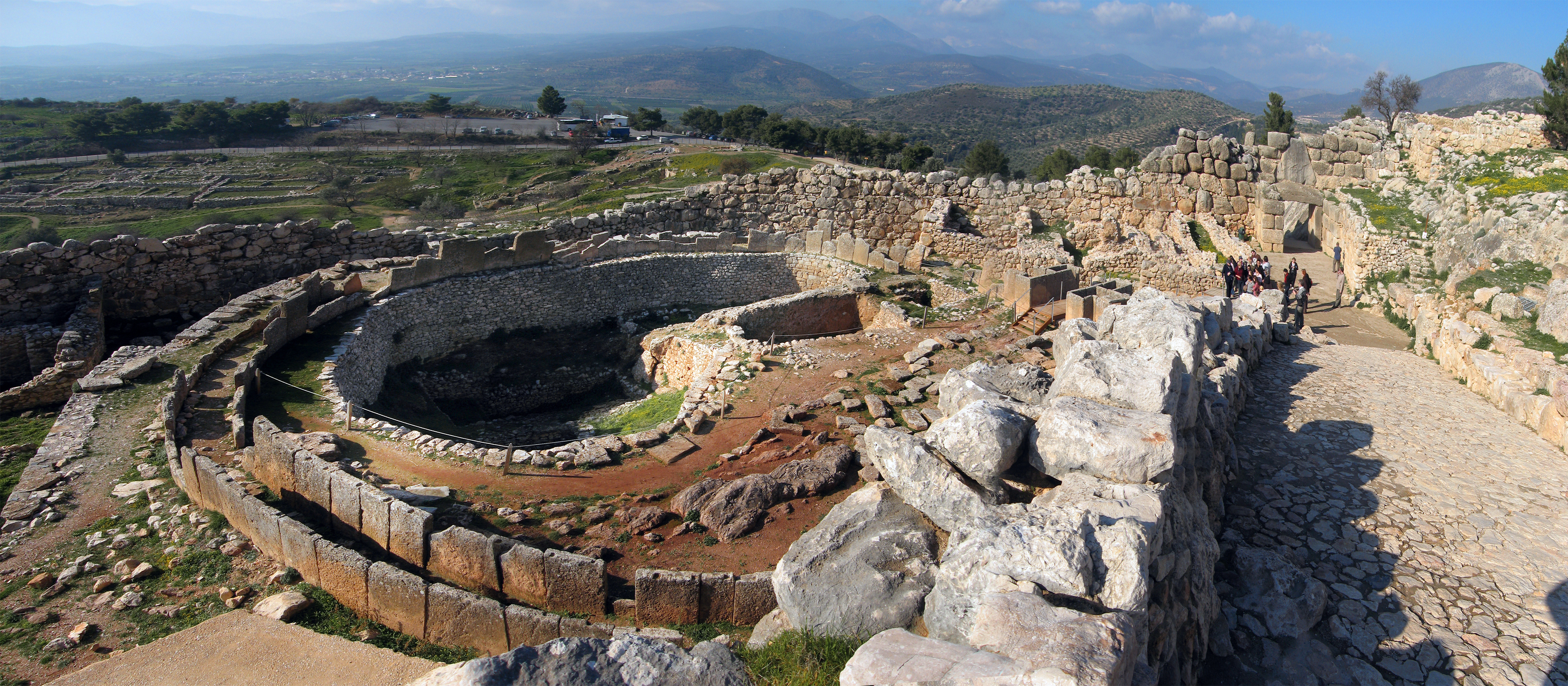
Grave Circle A, Mycenae ruins from the Late Helladic period (1600 BC)

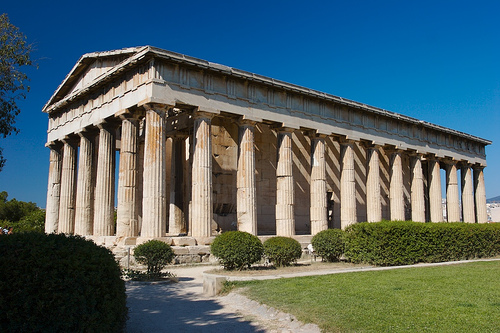
The Temple of Hephaestus at the Agora of Athens, built 449-415 BC

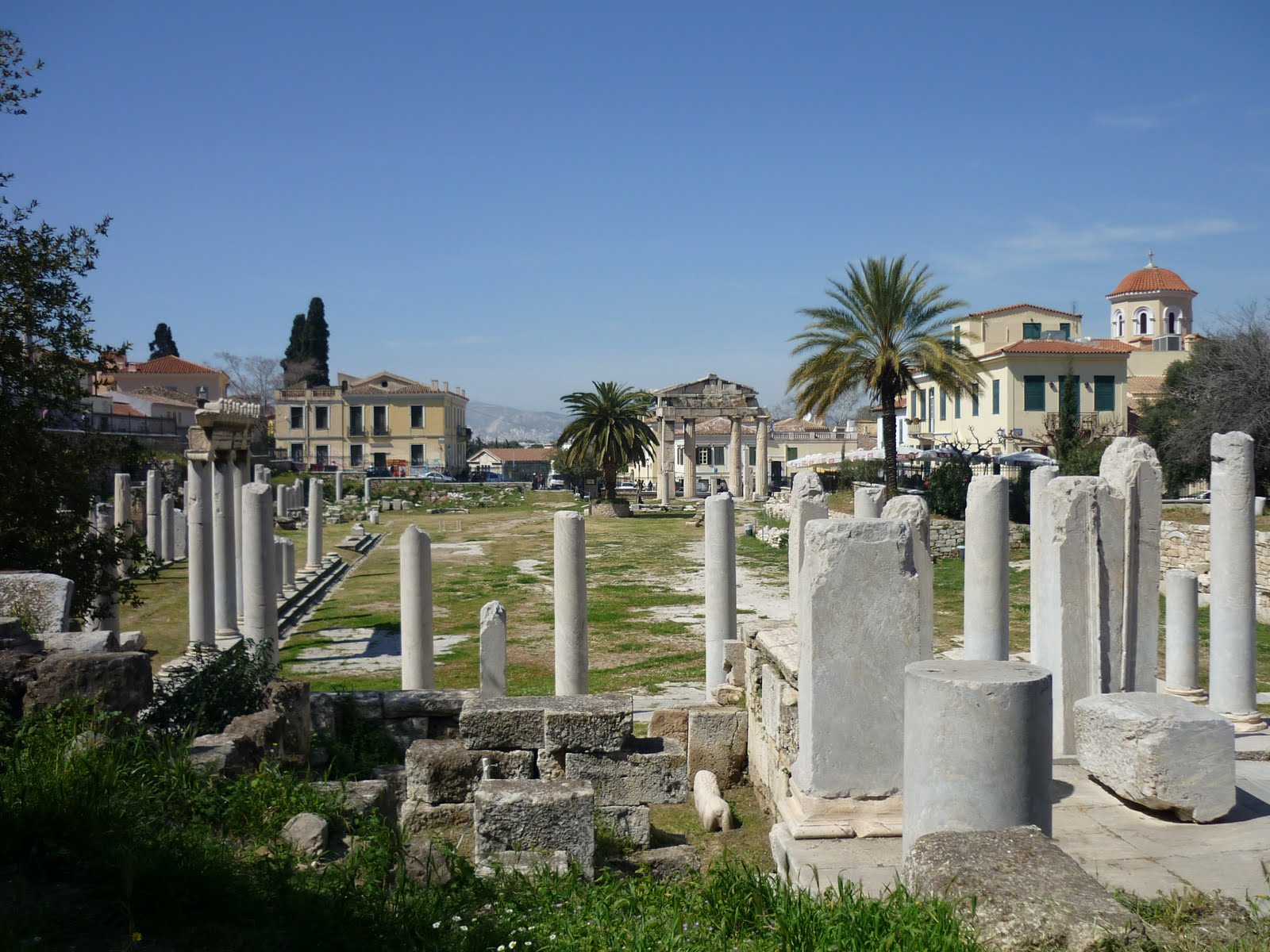
Remains of the Roman Agora built in Athens during the Roman period

History of Greece

=== By period ===
Timeline of Greek history

- Neolithic Greece
- Helladic period
- Ancient Greece
  - Greek Dark Ages
  - Archaic Greece
  - Classical Greece
  - Hellenistic Greece
- Roman Greece
- Byzantine Greece
- Ottoman Greece
- Modern Greece
  - Timeline of modern Greek history
- Kingdom of Greece
- Second Hellenic Republic
- Third Hellenic Republic

=== By subject ===
- Economic history of Greece
- History of the Greek alphabet
- Military history of Greece
  - Military history of Greece during World War II

== Culture of Greece ==
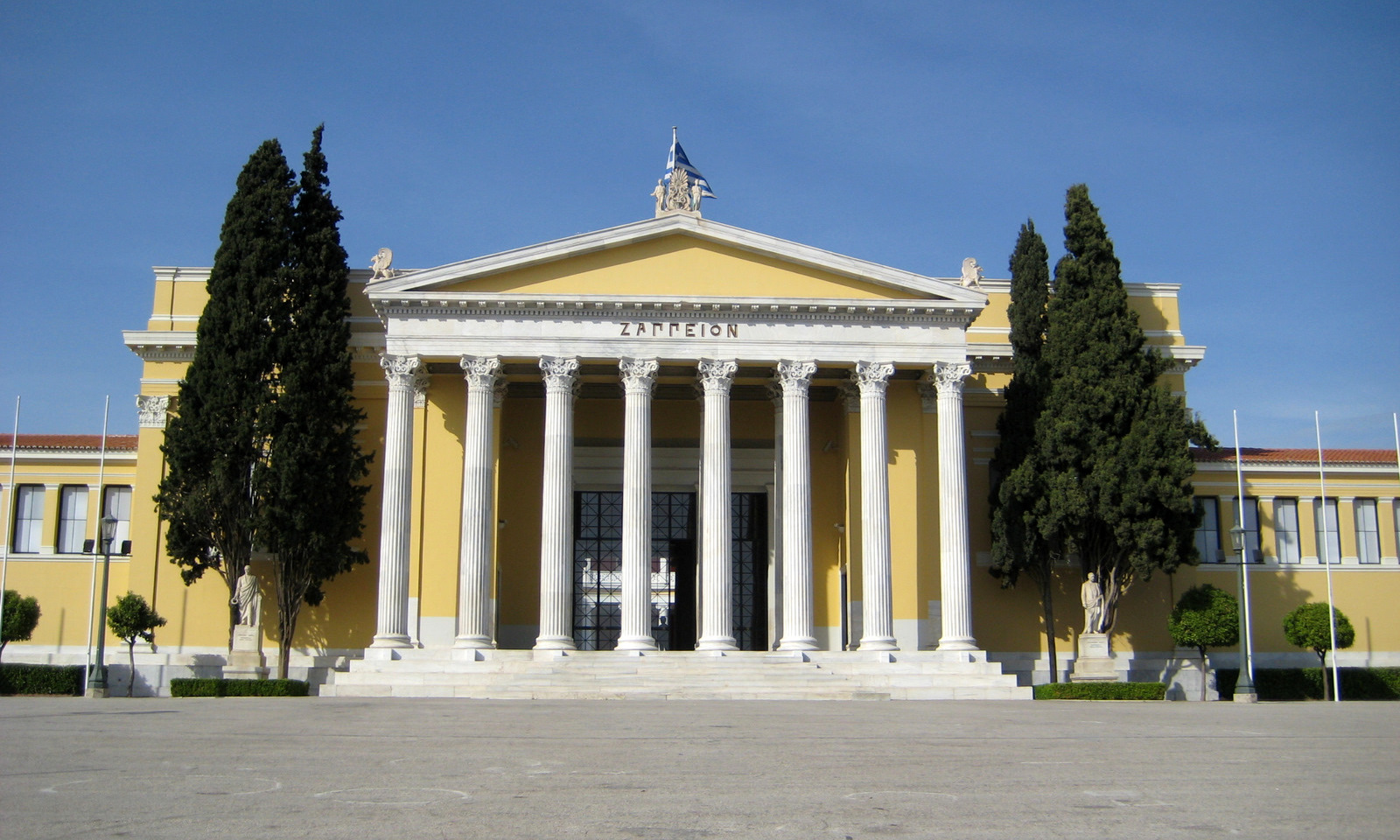
The Zappeion, a Conference and Exhibition Centre in Neoclassical style

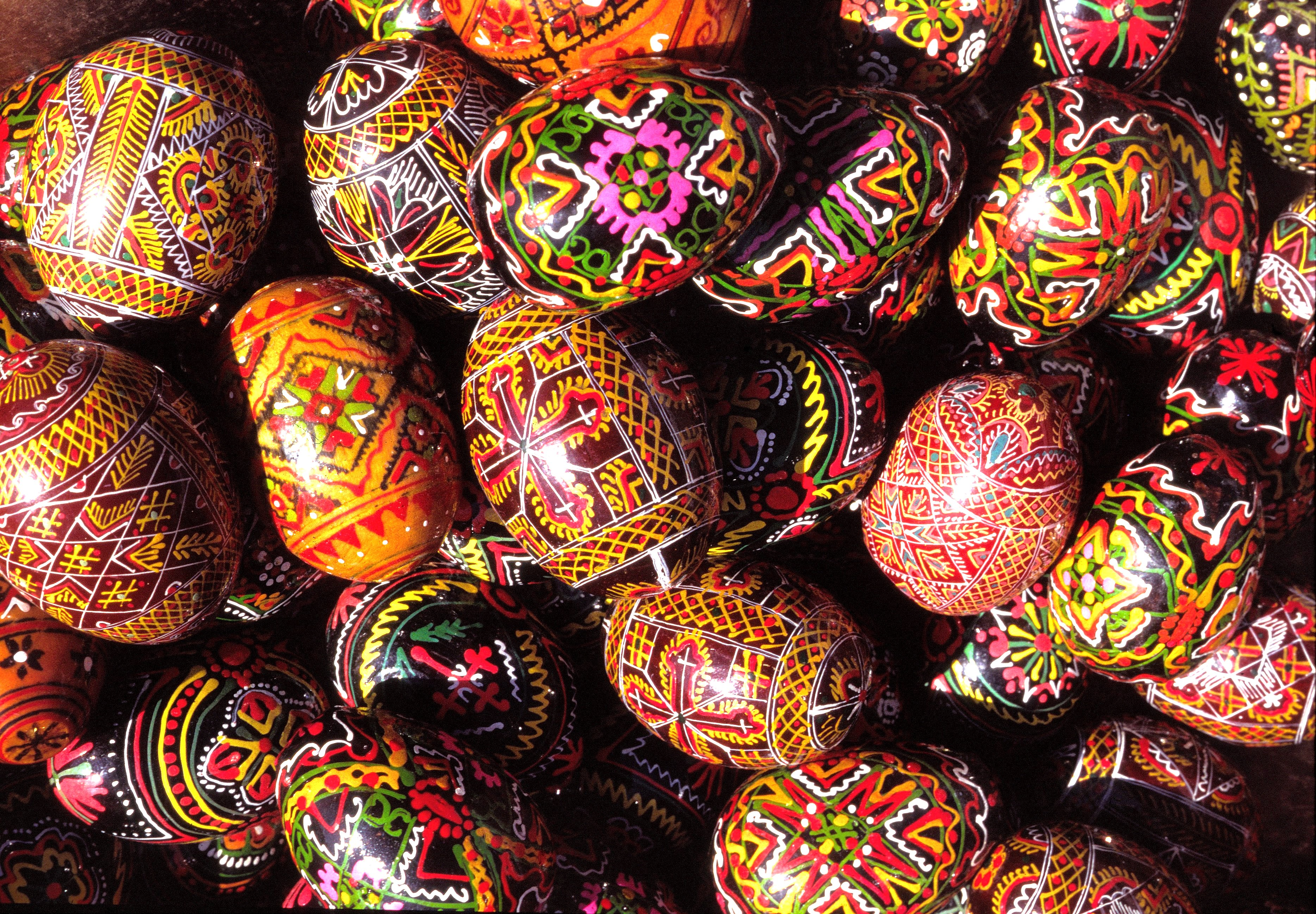
Easter eggs in Greece

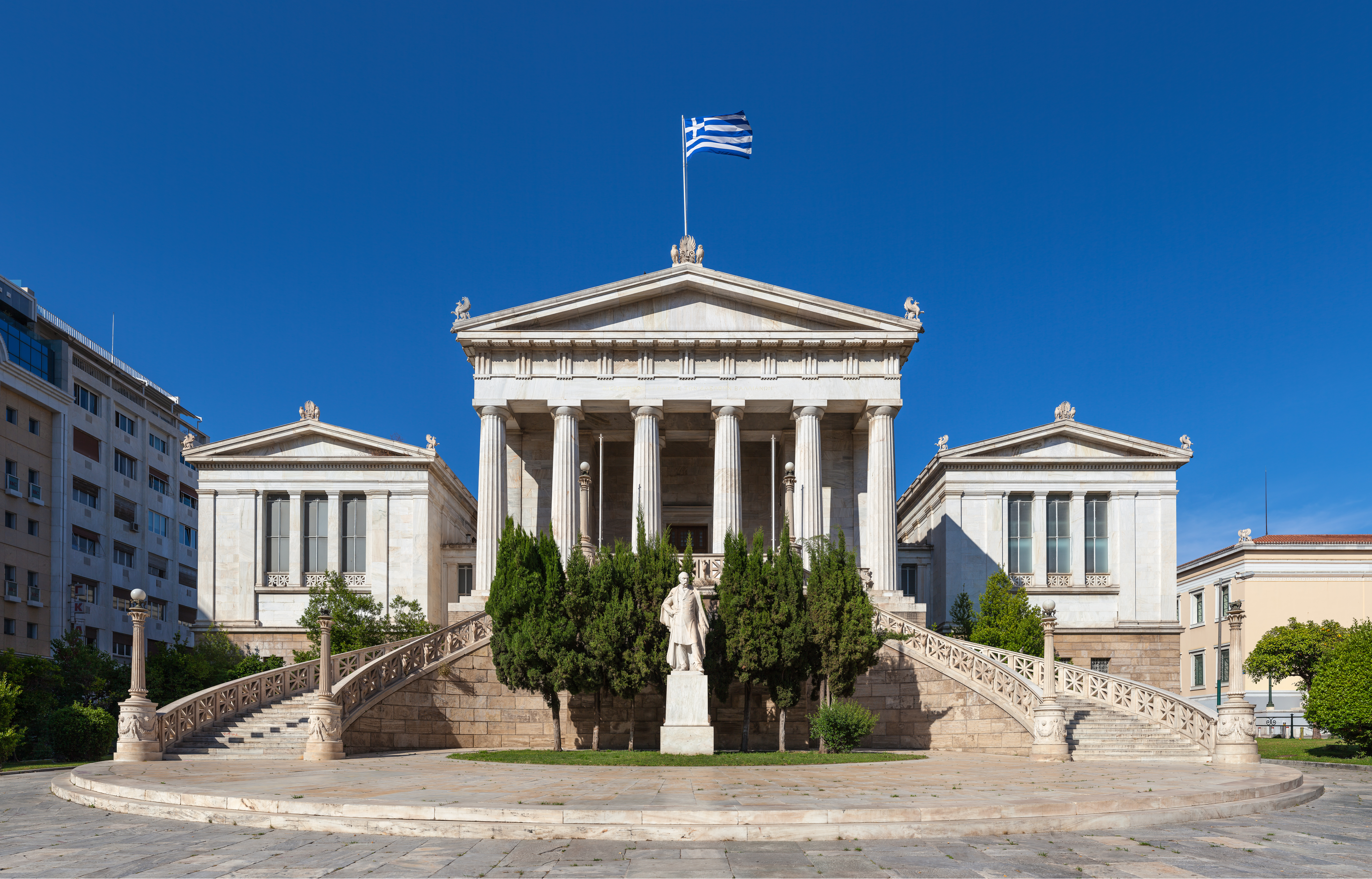
National Library of Greece

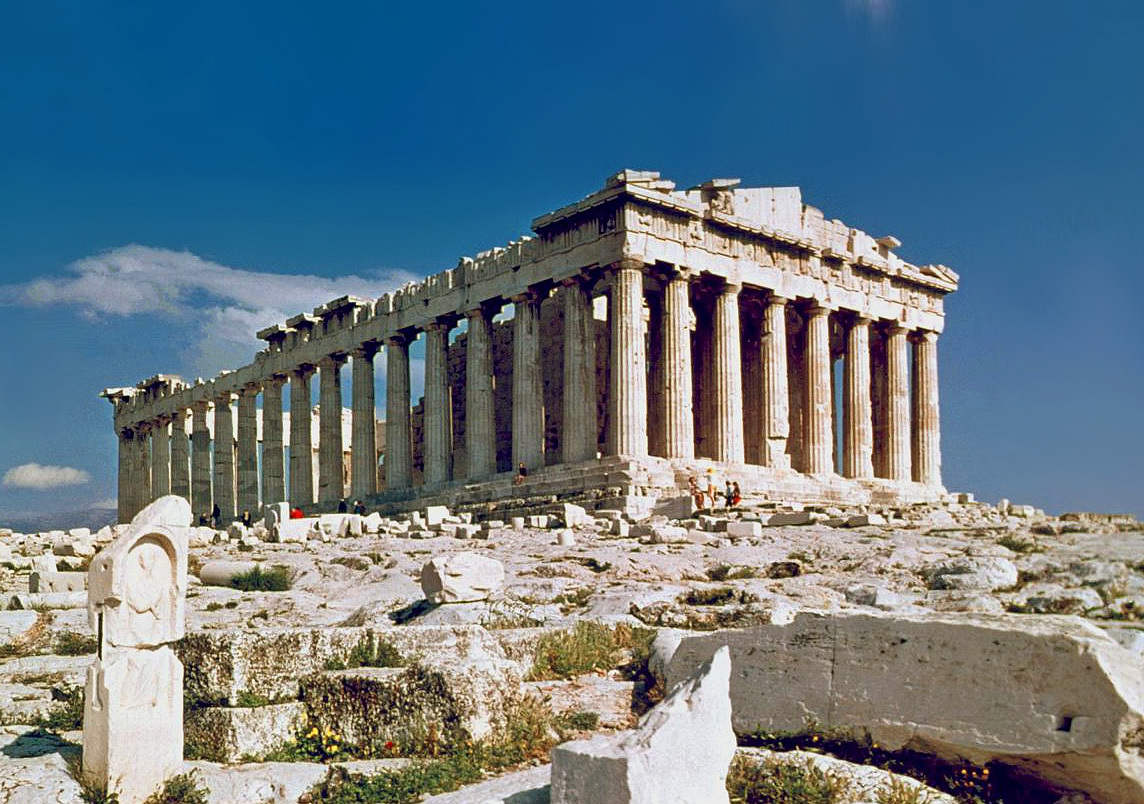
The Parthenon in Athens

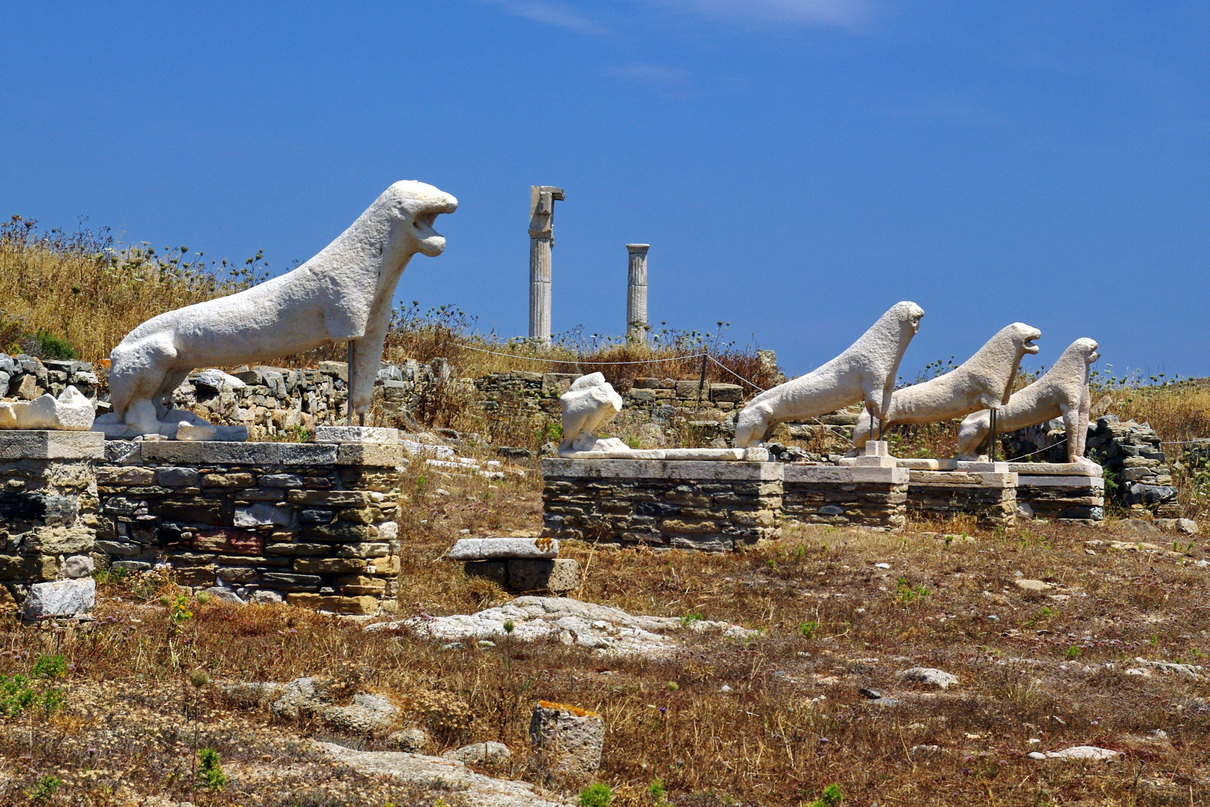
The Terrace of the Lions in Delos

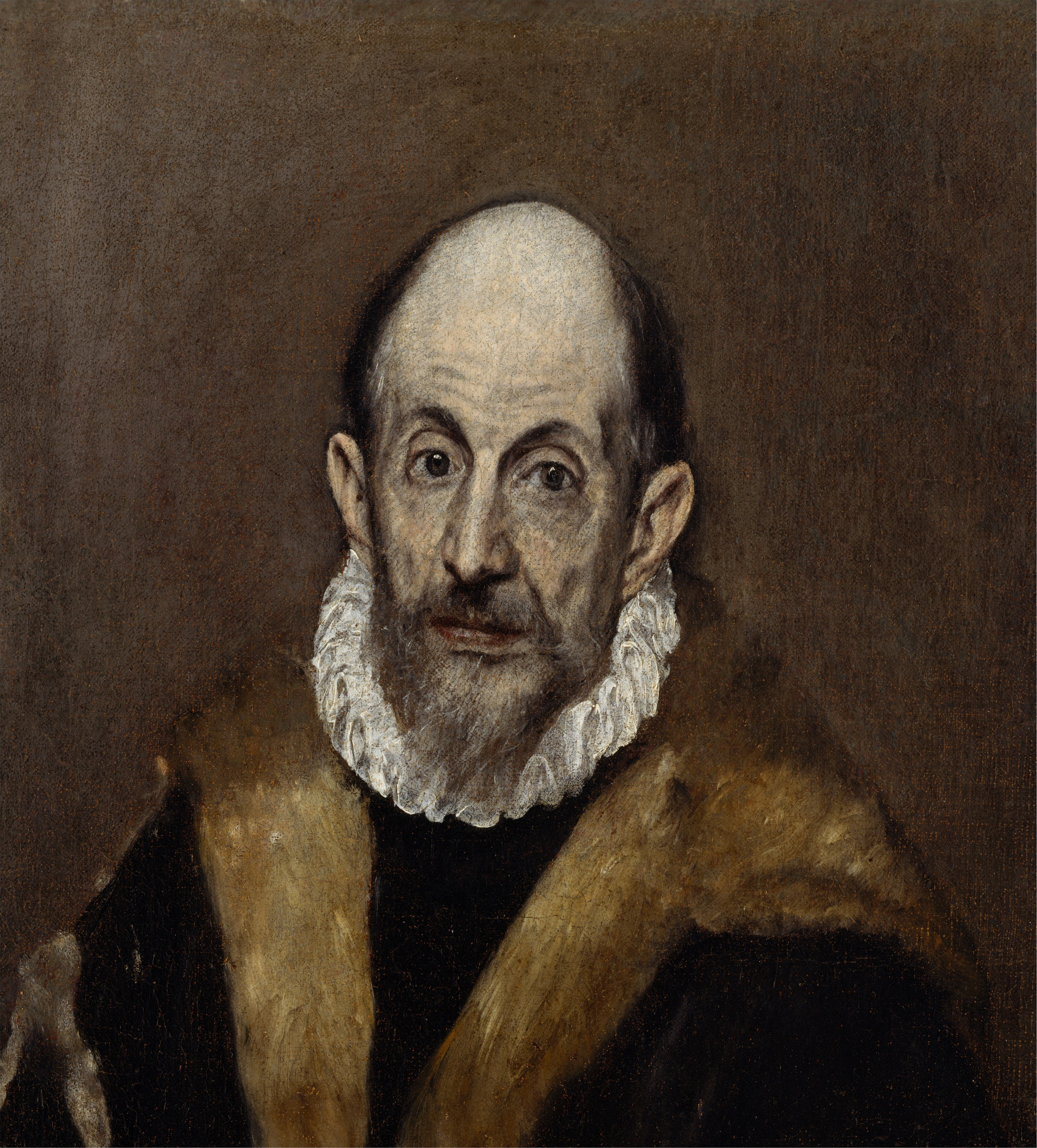
El Greco, painter, sculptor and architect born in Fodele, Crete

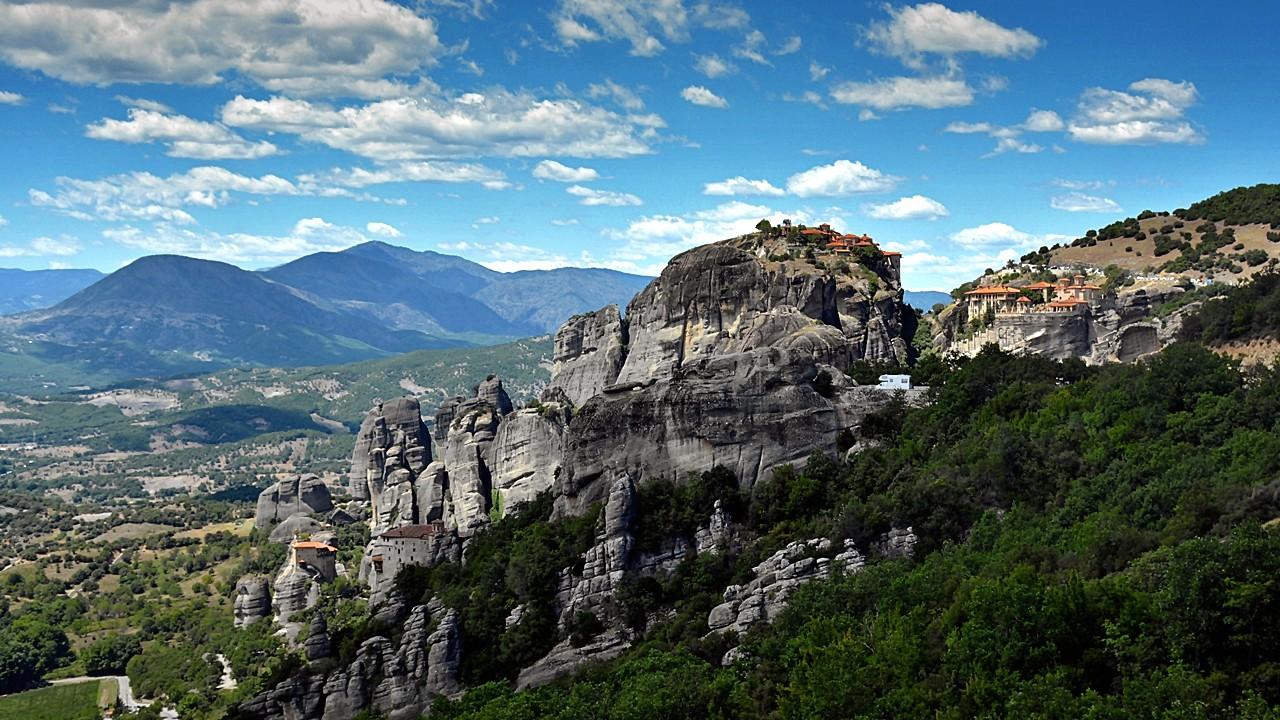
Meteora, a UNESCO World Heritage Site

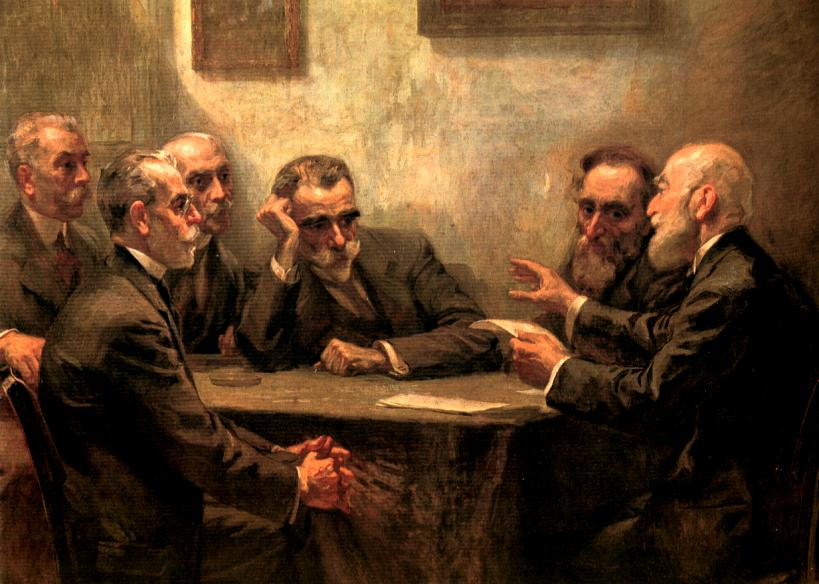
Parnassos Literary Society. From left: Georgios Stratigis, Georgios Drossinis, Ioannis Polemis, Kostis Palamas at the center, Georgios Souris and Aristomenis Provelengios, poets of the New Athenian School. Painting by Georgios Roilos

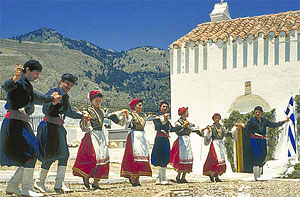
A group of Sfakians dancing the Syrtos

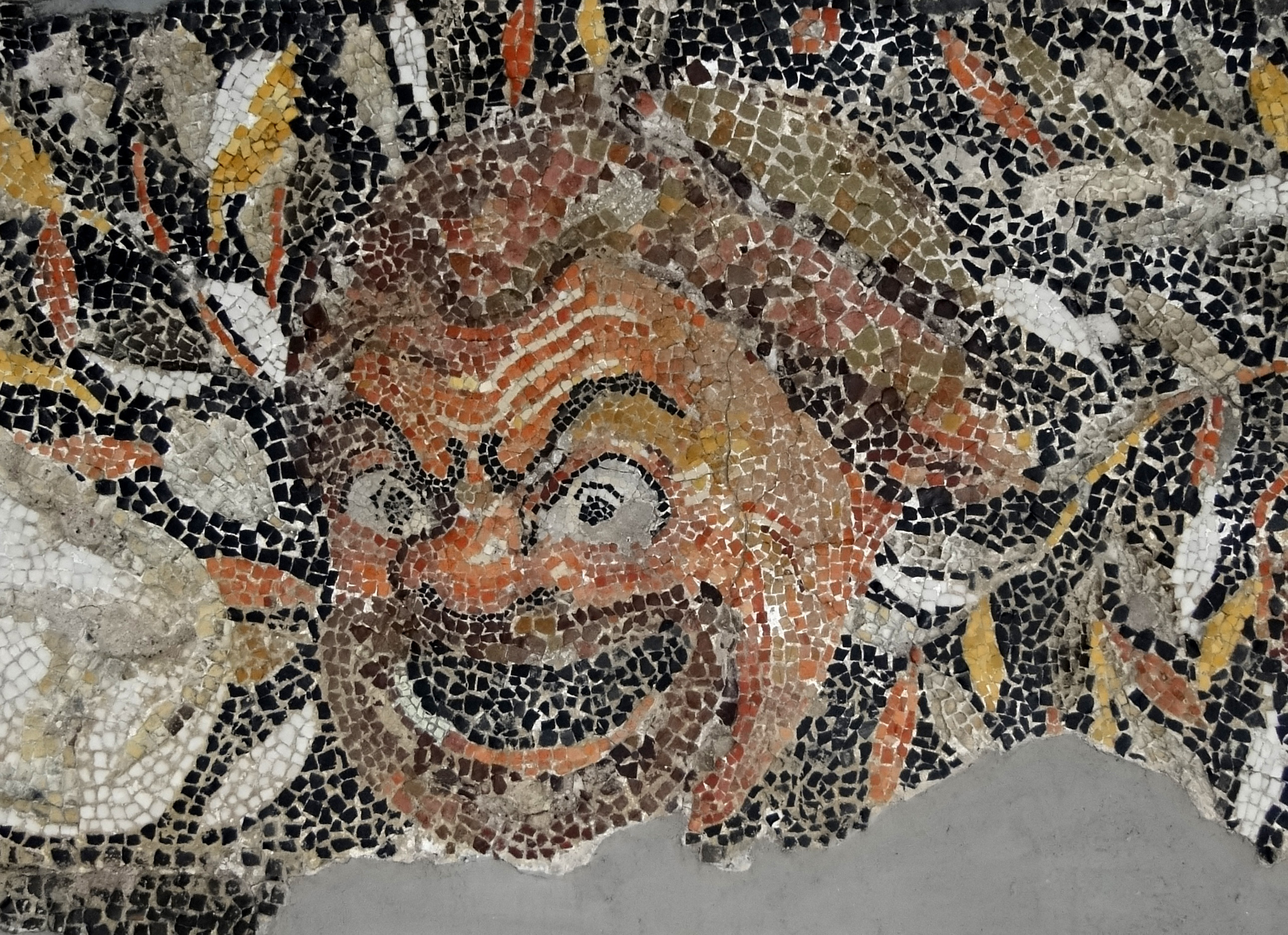
Mosaic of a Greek theatre mask from the Jewelry Quarter of Delos

Culture of Greece

- Architecture of Greece
  - Castles in Greece
  - Modern Greek architecture
- Cuisine of Greece
  - Cretan cuisine
  - Cuisine of the Ionian islands
  - Cypriot cuisine
  - Macedonian cuisine
  - Greek restaurant
  - Greek wine
- Greek dress
- Greek nationalism
- Languages of Greece
  - Greek language question
  - Modern Greek
    - Varieties of Modern Greek
      - Calabrian Greek
      - Cappadocian Greek
      - Demotic Greek
      - Griko dialect
      - Katharevousa
      - Mariupol Greek
      - Pontic Greek
      - Tsakonian language
- Media in Greece
  - Newspapers in Greece
  - Radio in Greece
  - Television in Greece
- Monuments of Greece
  - Acropolis of Athens
  - Ancient Agora of Athens
  - Ancient Theatre of Epidaurus
  - Arch of Galerius and Rotunda
  - Erechtheion
  - Greek pyramids
  - Knossos Minoan palace complex
  - Lion Gate
  - Odeon of Herodes Atticus
  - Palaestra at Olympia
  - Stadium of Delphi
  - Temple of Hephaestus
  - Temple of Olympian Zeus, Athens
  - Terrace of the Lions
  - Theatre of Dionysus
  - Tholos of Delphi
- Museums in Greece
- National symbols of Greece
  - Coat of arms of Greece
  - Flag of Greece
  - National anthem of Greece
  - National colours of Greece
  - National personification
- People of Greece
  - Ethnic Minorities in Greece
  - Names of the Greeks
  - Greek diaspora
    - Greeks in Egypt
    - Greeks in Italy
  - Immigration to Greece
- Philhellenism
- Public holidays in Greece
  - Ohi Day
- World Heritage Sites in Greece

=== Art in Greece ===
- Art in Greece
  - Modern Greek art
    - Greek academic art of the 19th century
    - Contemporary Greek art
- Cinema of Greece
- Literature of Greece
  - Modern Greek literature
  - List of Greek writers
- Music of Greece
  - Greek composers
  - Greek folk music
    - Music of the Aegean islands
    - Music of Crete
    - Music of Cyprus
    - Music of Epirus
    - Music of the Heptanese
      - Ionian School
    - Music of Macedonia
    - Music of the Peloponnese
    - Music of Thessaly
    - Music of Thrace
  - Greek dances
  - Greek musical instruments
  - Greek National Opera
  - Greek New Wave
- Theatre in Greece
  - National Theatre of Greece

=== Religion in Greece ===
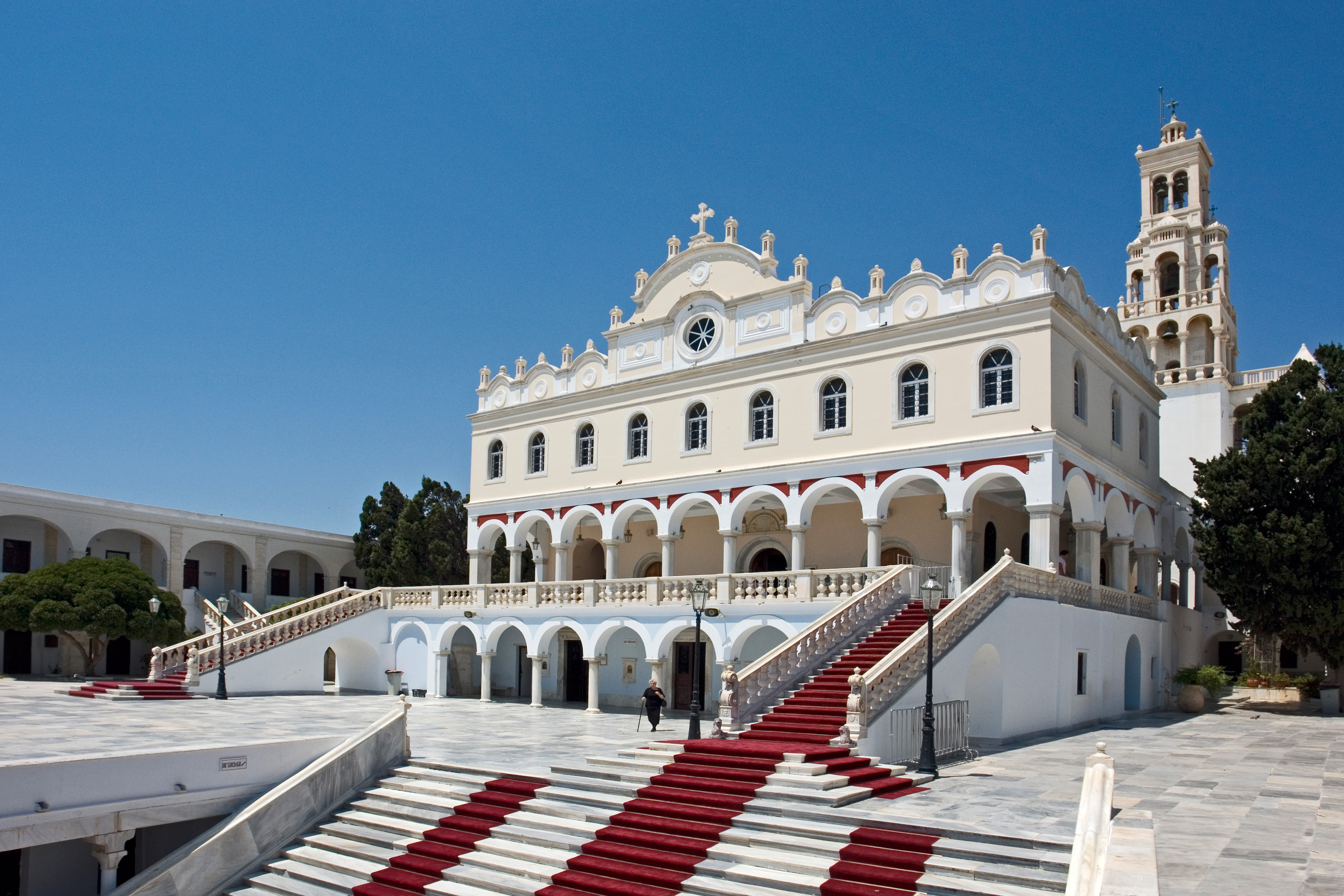
Our Lady of Tinos, the major Marian shrine in Greece

Religion in Greece

- Catholic Church in Greece
  - Archdiocese of Athens
  - Archdiocese of Rhodos
  - Archdiocese of Corfù, Zante and Cefalonia
  - Archdiocese of Naxos, Andros, Tinos and Mykonos
  - Apostolic Vicariate of Thessaloniki
- Greek Orthodox Church
  - Church of Greece
    - Archbishopric of Athens
- Buddhism in Greece
- Hinduism in Greece
- Islam in Greece
- Judaism in Greece
- Protestantism in Greece
- Sikhism in Greece

=== Sports in Greece ===
Opening ceremony of the 2004 Summer Olympics in Athen's Olympic Stadium

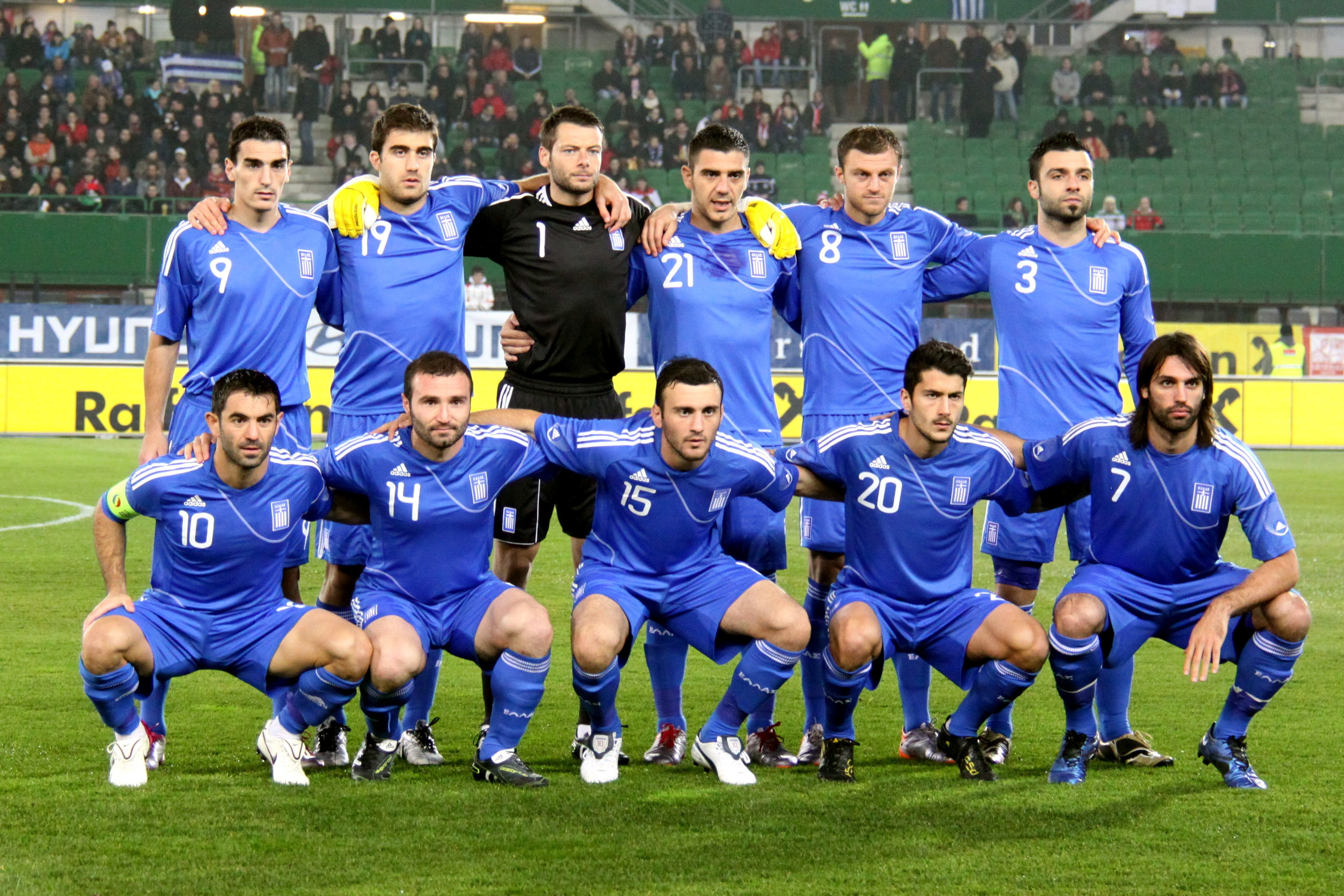
The Greece national football team in 2010

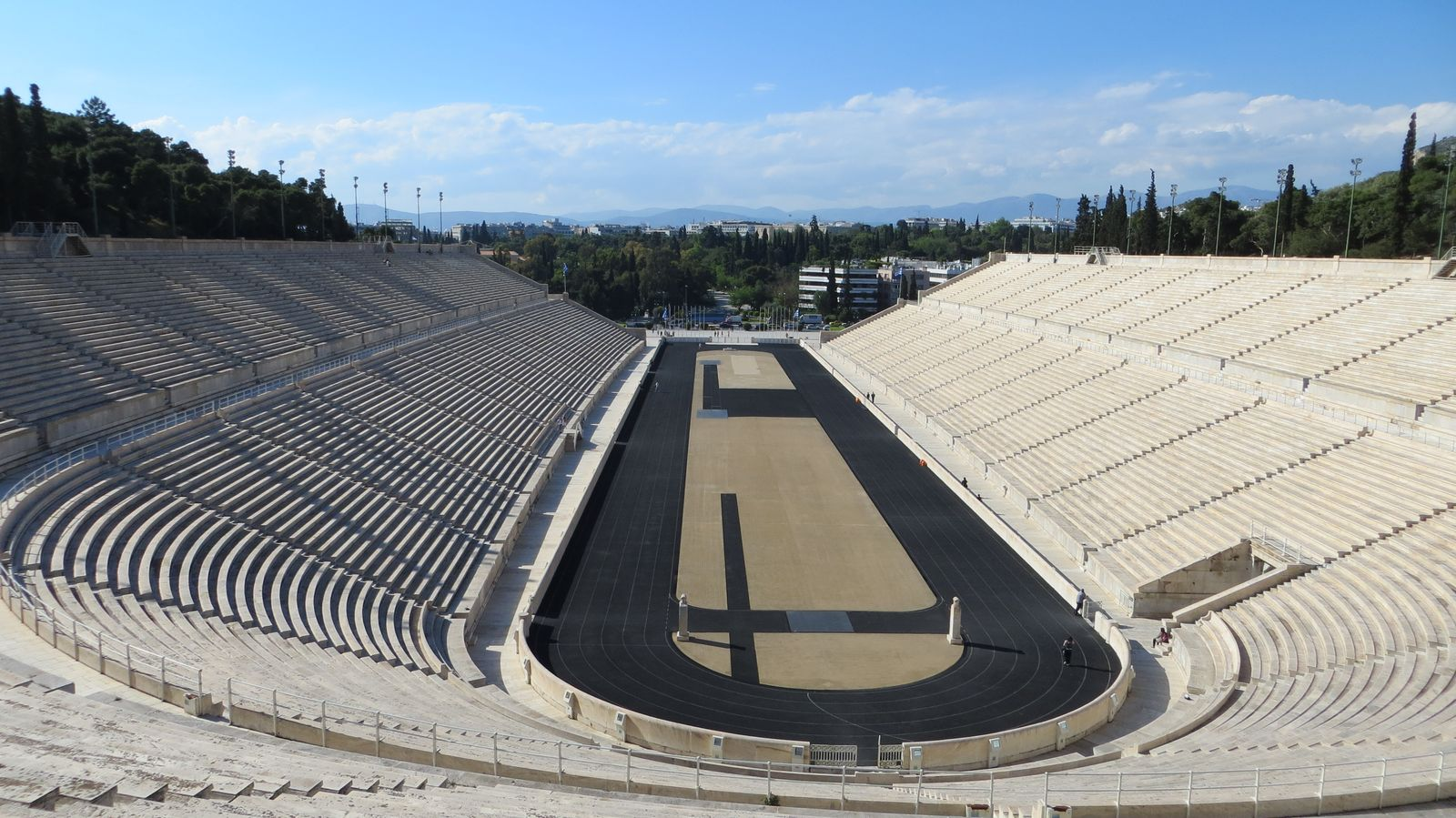
Panathenaic Stadium, the only stadium in the world built entirely of marble

Sports in Greece

- Baseball in Greece
- Basketball in Greece
  - Greece national basketball team
- Cricket in Greece
- Football in Greece
  - Greece national football team
  - List of football clubs in Greece
  - Football League
  - Super League Greece
- Greece at the Olympics
  - 1896 Summer Olympics
  - 2004 Summer Olympics
    - 2004 Summer Olympics opening ceremony
- Greece at the Paralympics
- Hockey in Greece
  - Ice hockey in Greece
- Rugby in Greece
  - Rugby union in Greece
  - Rugby league in Greece
- Sports venues in Greece
  - Hellinikon Olympic Complex
  - Karaiskakis Stadium
  - O.A.C.A. Olympic Indoor Hall
  - Olympic Stadium (Athens)
  - Pampeloponnisiako Stadium
  - Panathenaic Stadium
  - Pankritio Stadium
  - Stavros Mavrothalassitis Stadium
  - Toumba Stadium

== Economy and infrastructure of Greece ==
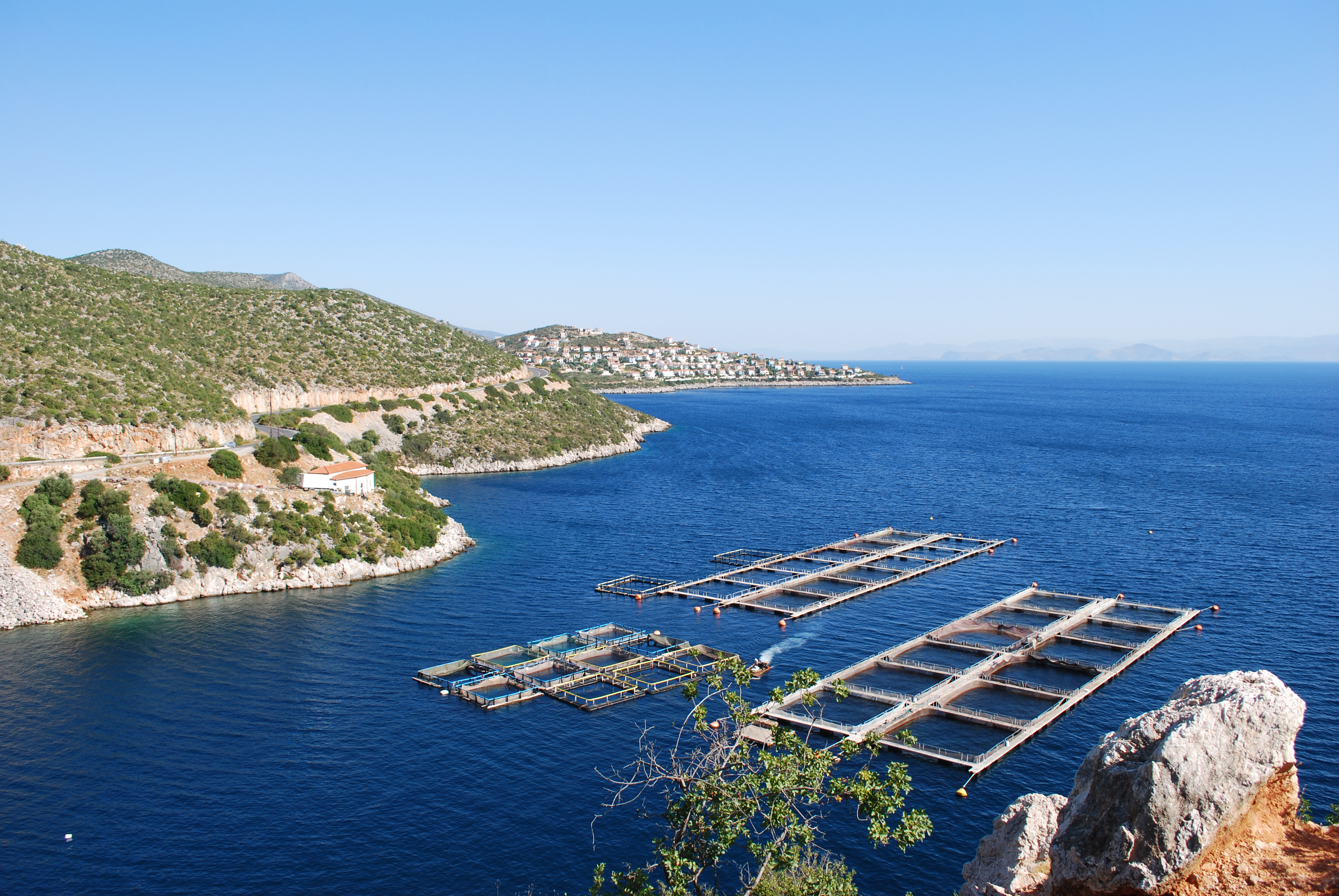
Fish farming, Argolic gulf

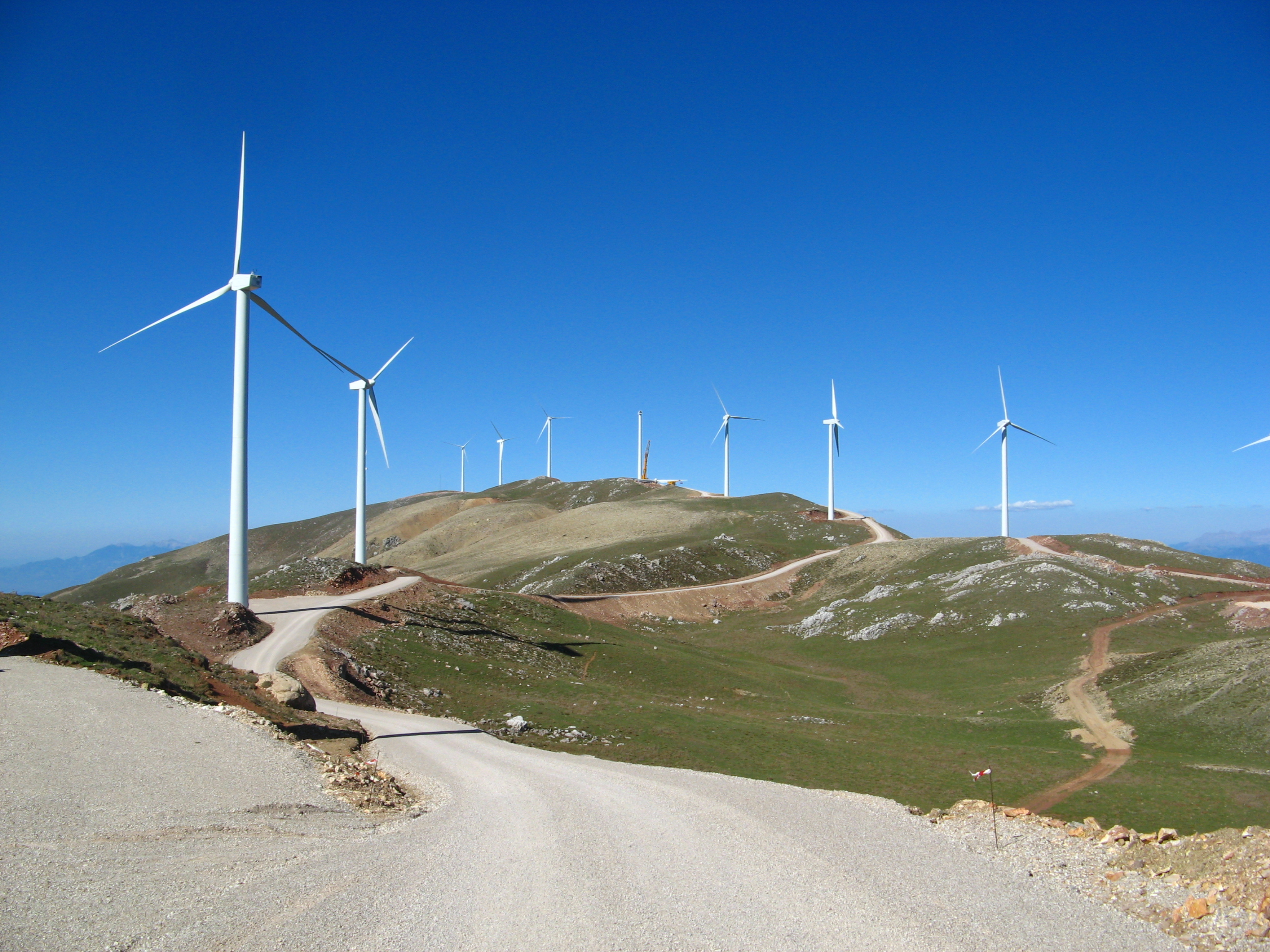
View of a wind farm, Panachaiko mountain

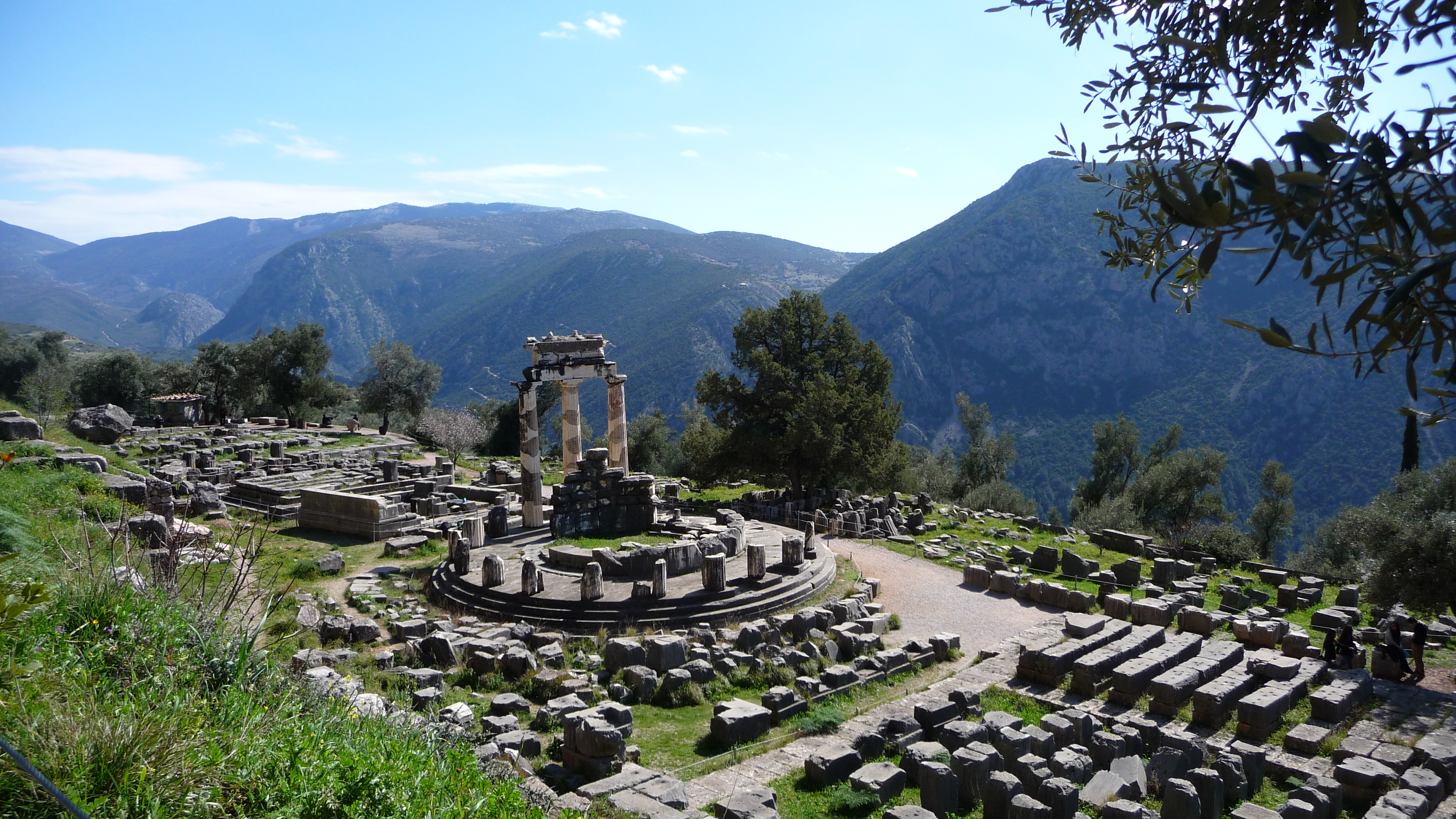
Delphi, a popular tourist destination

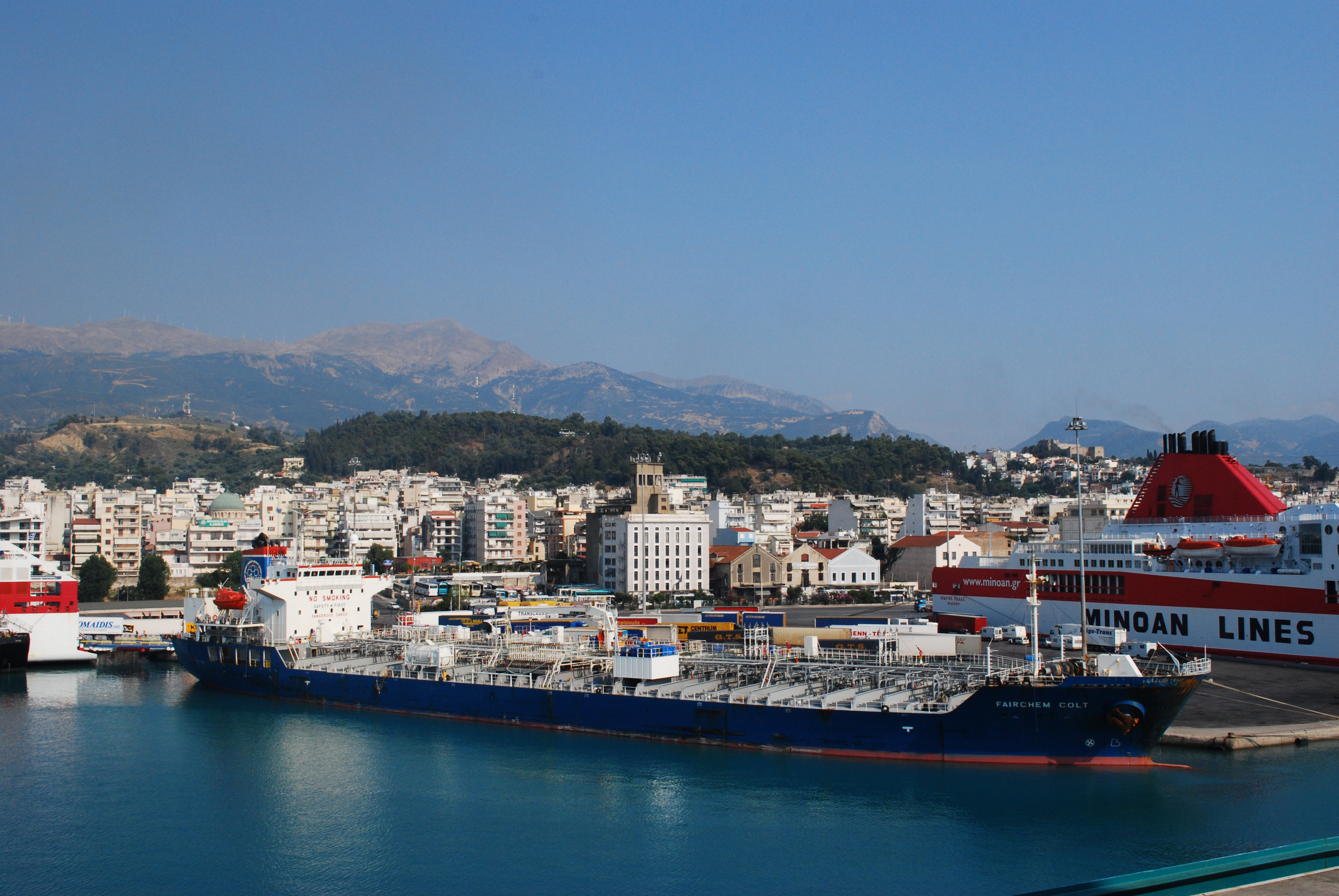
View of the port of Patras

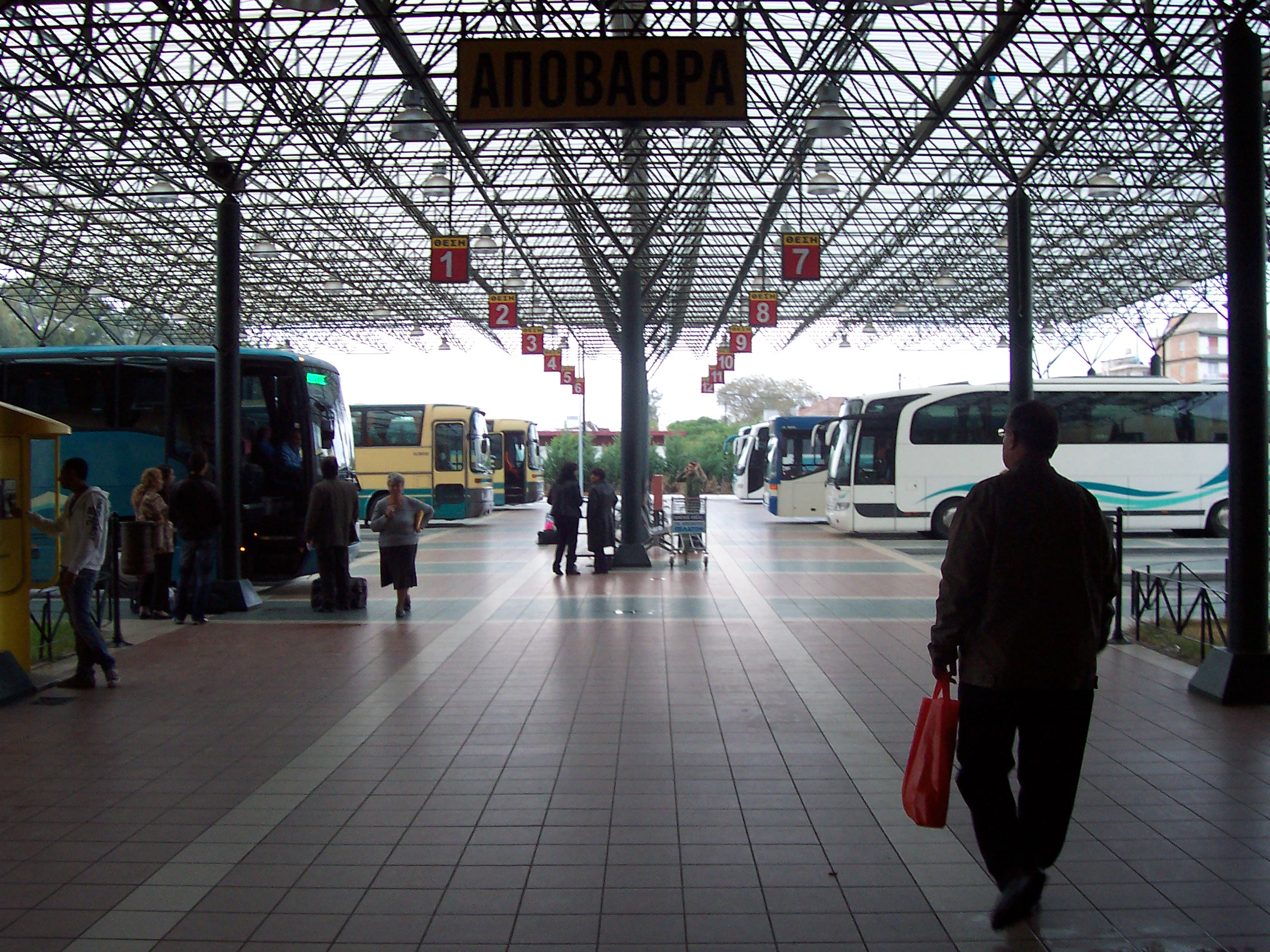
KTEL bus station in Pyrgos

Economy of Greece

- Economic rank, by nominal GDP (2007): 27th (twenty-seventh)
- Agriculture in Greece
  - Laiki agora
- Banking in Greece
  - List of banks in Greece
    - Bank of Greece
    - National Bank of Greece
  - Capital controls in Greece
- Communications in Greece
  - Internet in Greece
- Companies of Greece
- Currency of Greece: Euro (see also: Euro topics)
  - Former currency: Greek drachma
  - ISO 4217: EUR
- Economic history of Greece
  - Greek economic miracle
- Energy in Greece
  - Renewable energy in Greece
- Maritime industry
  - Greek shipping
    - Greek Merchant Marine
- Science and technology
  - Greek inventions and discoveries
- Tourism in Greece
  - Visa policy of the Schengen Area
- Transport in Greece
  - Rapid transit in Greece
  - Airports in Greece
  - Ports in Greece
  - Rail transport in Greece
    - History of rail transport in Greece
  - Commuter rail
  - Urban rail
    - Athens Metro
    - Thessaloniki Metro
    - Tramway systems in Greece
  - KTEL
  - Roads in Greece
    - Attiki Odos
      - Central Greece Motorway
    - Olympia Odos
- Water supply and sanitation in Greece

== Education in Greece ==
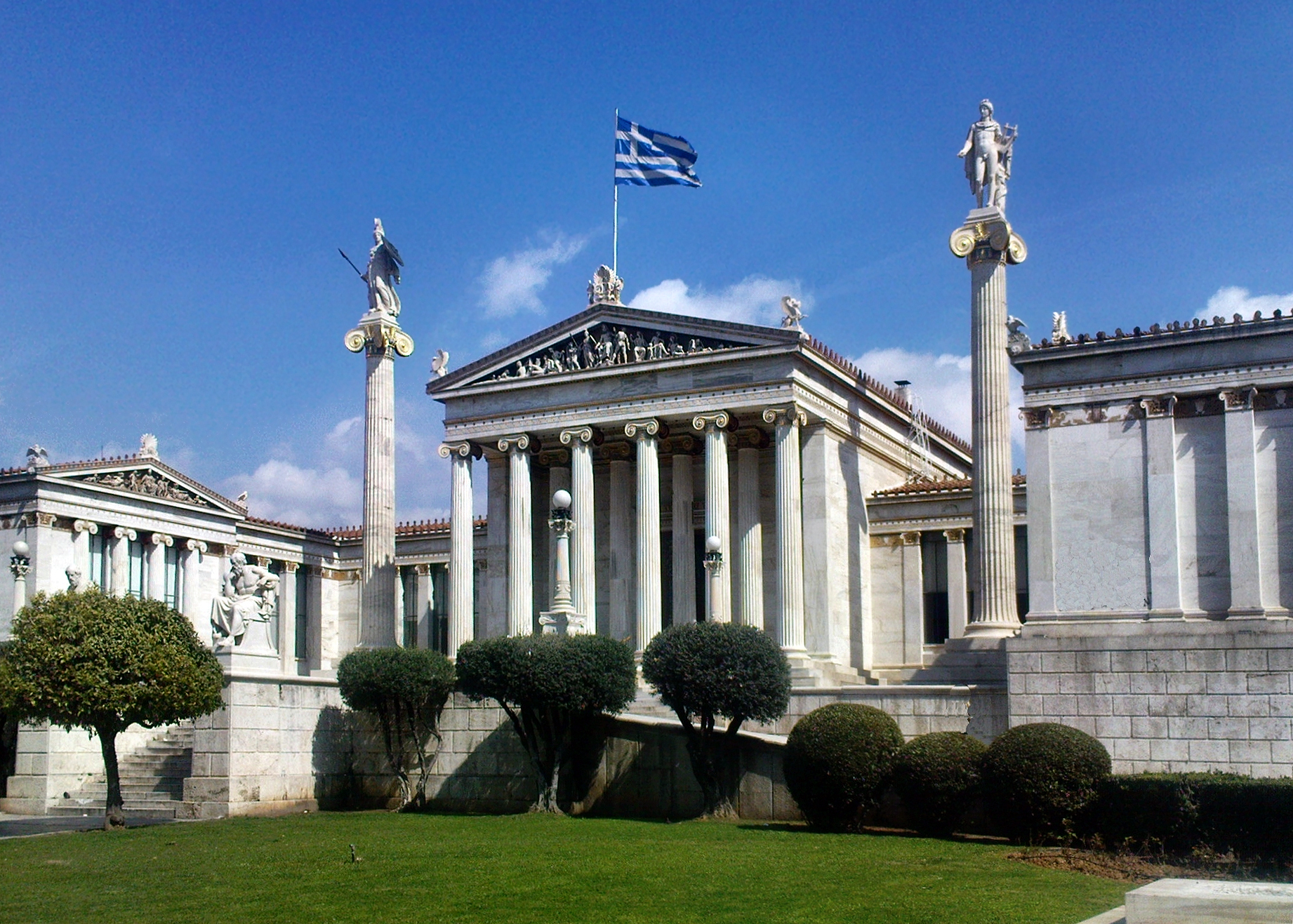
The Academy of Athens

Education in Greece

- Academic grading in Greece
- Higher education in Greece
  - Universities in Greece
  - Polytechnics
  - Τechnological Universities-Technological educational institutes
- Vocational education
  - IEK

== Health in Greece ==
Healthcare in Greece

- Hospitals in Greece
- Obesity in Greece
- Smoking in Greece

== See also ==
- List of Greece-related topics
- List of international rankings
- Member state of the European Union
- Member state of the North Atlantic Treaty Organization
- Member state of the United Nations
- Outline of ancient Greece
- Outline of geography
