= 2024 Greek coastal development law =

The 2024 Greek coastal development law (officially Όροι αξιοποίησης της δημόσιας περιουσίας στις παραθαλάσσιες περιοχές και άλλες διατάξεις translated as "Terms of use of public property in coastal areas and other provisions") is a controversial legal change to the use of coastal areas in Greece. The Greek Parliament passed the bill On February 29, 2024. The bill passed with 158 votes in favor and 142 against, which the majority of the New Democracy party supported. All eight opposition parties voted against the legislation. Environmental groups both within and outside the country described the law as violating obligations under international treaties and EU law.

Deputy Minister of Finance Harry Theoharis stated that the law is intended to "protect the great richness of the country's long coastline." In practice, the bill provides for the following:

1. Establishment of a process for auctioning rights to beaches by Greece's land registry through an electronic system.
2. Designation of protected and remote beaches, particularly those designated as Natura 2000, which cannot be developed.
3. The establishment of stricter rules on the management of beaches and free access for citizens, as well as the establishment of obligations for those leasing beaches.
4. The use of new technologies to improve the monitoring of beach concessions.
5. Stricter penalties for violating rules, with fines set based on the level of the infringement.
6. The removal and demolition of illegal structures.

The government insists that these provisions will benefit business and protect the environment. Minister of National Economy and Finance Kostis Hatzidakis claimed that the law seeks to utilize Greece's coastline better. He said, "This summer, a lot will change on our beaches. With the new law, we are improving the protection of our beaches, putting stricter rules on their management and ensuring free access for citizens. At the same time, we are creating a more effective control mechanism by using new technologies (drones, satellites) to ensure that the new rules are strictly enforced. Last summer, we gave a good example; everyone understood that we are not joking about protecting our beaches. This year, we will be even more effective."

== Background ==
The European Union has sued the Greek national government several times due to its failure to uphold EU environmental standards. In 2002, the European Commission sued Greece for failing to take adequate steps to protect sea turtles on the island of Zakynthos. The ECJ ruled in favor of the commission, stating that Greece "failed to fulfil its obligations under the EC Treaty and Article 12(1)(b) and (d) of Council Directive 92/43/EEC of 21 May 1992 on the conservation of natural habitats and of wild fauna and flora." In the Court's words, Greece did not do enough to protect the sea turtle's breeding grounds.

In 2006, the Commission again sued Greece for failing to uphold Directive 92/43/EEC, claiming that the Greek government failed to protect the breeding grounds of vipers (Vipera Schweizeri) on the island of Milos. The ECJ sided with the commission.

In 2020, the Commission sued Greece for a third time, arguing that Greece failed to establish the 239 Sites of Community Importance identified in Commission Decision 2006/613/EC. Sites of Community Importance are areas designated by the European Union as critical to maintaining biogeographical richness. The ECJ concurred, claiming that "the Hellenic Republic has failed to fulfil its obligations under Articles 4(4) and 6(1) of Council Directive 92/43/EEC of 21 May 1992 on the conservation of natural habitats and of wild fauna and flora, as amended by Council Directive 2006/105/EC of 20 November 2006."

The new coastal development law may trigger another case involving Greece and the European Commission.

The Protocol on Integrated Coastal Zone Management in the Mediterranean, which requires that signatories establish a minimum 100-meter setback zone, was ratified by the European Union in 2009. The Greek national government has not ratified the convention, but, as an EU member state, its current policies violate the agreement.

== Reactions ==
Eight environmental organizations released a joint statement condemning the bill. These are: WWF Greece, MEDASSET, Greenpeace, Ecological Recycling Society, Callisto, Hellenic Orthinological Society, Hellenic Society for the Protection of Nature, and the Society for the Protection of Prespa. They claim that the bill fails to effectively protect coastal zones by removing the ban on the concession of small coastal areas (less than 5 meters in length or width, or less than 150 square meters in area) and omitting important measures that would reduce the prevalence of illegal building projects. The eight organizations called on the government to do the following:

1. Withdraw a series of problematic provisions, which seriously undermine Greece's climate resilience, most notably the abolition of the 30-meters setback zone.
2. Explicit ban of any individual or business responsible for illegal constructions from the right to apply for state aid and benefit from subsidies and other economic incentives.
3. Immediate ratification by Greece of the Protocol on the Integrated Coastal Zone Management in the Mediterranean sets a minimum 100-meters setback zone.
4. Strengthen the independence and available resources of the Inspectorate of Inspectors and Auditors to enable it to intervene effectively in arbitrary acts and to proceed immediately to remove illegal constructions.
5. Fully comply with the decision of the European Court of Justice, which ruled that Greece violates the EU's Habitats Directive by failing to legally protect its Natura 2000 areas and approve the necessary management measures.

The left-wing opposition party Syriza has argued that the bill threatens to allow private interests to exploit the beaches.
