= Rapid transit in Greece =

Rapid transportation in Greece

Rapid transit in Greece refers to the systems of rapid transit at present active in Greece.

A "rapid transit", "underground", "subway", "elevated railway", "metro" or "metropolitan railway" system is an electric passenger railway in an urban area with a high capacity and frequency, and grade separation from other traffic. Rapid transit systems are typically located either in tunnels or on elevated rails above street level. Outside urban centers, rapid transit lines may run on grade separated ground level tracks.

In Greece there are several systems that are called "Rapid Transit":

- Athens Metro, an underground and overground railway network serving the city of Athens since 1904;
- Athens Tram, a tram network serving the city of Athens, began electrified service in 1908 and revived in 2001;
- Thessaloniki Metro, an under-underground railway network for Greece's second-largest city;
