= Timeline of the Hellenic Army =

The Hellenic Army is the land force component of the Hellenic Armed Forces. It was officially founded in 1828 and still operates today as the main contributor to the Balkan Battle Group. This article details the history of the Hellenic Army in the form a of a timeline from its de facto founding to the modern day.

== 1821–1832 ==
- September 1814 - The secretive Philiki Etaireia is founded at Odessa. From the start it is the locus of anti-Ottoman activity among Greeks. Members with military experience will form the core of Ypsilantis staff.
- 6 March 1821 - Alexander Ypsilantis crosses the River Prut into Wallachia with two battalions of volunteer infantry and a troop of cavalry raised in Russia.
- 23 March 1821 - Petrobey Mavromichalis is proclaimed "commander-in-chief of the Spartan forces" by the newly founded Senate of Messenia in the wake of the successful capture of Kalamata.
- August, 1822 - Theodoros Kolokotronis ambushes and destroys the army of Mahmud Dramali Pasha at the Dervenakia pass; the sultan turns to Ibrahim Pasha of Egypt for help in suppressing the Greek revolt.
- March 1824 - the motley "Byron Brigade" composed of Greek and Philhellene volunteers begins to organize at Missolonghi.

== 1833–1862 ==
- 1833 - The newly arrived King Othon creates battalions of line infantry on the West European model. Each battalion includes a company of native Greek sharpshooters or Evzones. Othon also forms ten battalions of Greek light infantry.
- 1836 - The number of Greek light infantry battalions is reduced from ten to eight. Four new Mountain Guard battalions are organized to patrol the Greco-Turkish frontier and hunt down bandits in the countryside.
- 1843 - The Mountain Guards are reorganized and expanded into four full regiments.
- 1867 - Four elite Evzones battalions are formed.
- 1868 - The Royal Guard Detachment is formed, consisting of two Evzone companies and a troop of cavalry.

== 1897–1913 ==
- 1912 - The Hellenic Army fields its first Aviators Company, which will eventually become the Army Aviation branch.

== 1919–1922 ==
- 15 May 1919 - Greek troops land and occupy Smyrna (İzmir), meeting only token resistance: this will become the opening skirmish of the Greco-Turkish War (1919–1922).
- 9–11 January 1921 - Greek and Turkish forces fight the inconclusive First Battle of İnönü.
- March 1921 - Greek and Turkish forces fight to a stalemate at the Second Battle of İnönü.
- June 1921 - The Greek advance is checked at Battle of Sakarya.
- 26–30 August 1922. The Greeks are routed at the Battle of Dumlupınar. Cut-off in a Turkish pincer movement, Major General Nikolaos Trikoupis and his men are taken prisoner. Surviving Hellenic Army units begin withdrawing to Smyrna.
- September 1922 - The Turkish Army captures Smyrna.

== 1923–1940 ==
- 1925 - Production at Breda of the "Philipides" design for an improved Mannlicher–Schönauer rifle is cancelled.
