= International rankings of Greece =

The following is a list of international rankings of Greece.

== Communications ==
- Mobile Telephony Market Penetration (Pyramid Research, OECD, national regulatory agencies): in 2008, ranked two among the top ten countries

== Demographics ==
- Population ranked 74 out of 228 countries and territories
- World Health Organization 2011 estimates Life expectancy ranked 17 out of 193 UN member states
- Population Density: in 2010 ranked 111 out of 235 countries

== Economic ==
- World Economic Forum Global Competitiveness Report 2014–2015 ranked 81 out of 144
- United Nations Development Programme 2014 Human Development Index ranked 29 out of 187

== Environment ==
- The Earth Institute and Yale Center for Environmental Law & Policy Environmental Performance Index 2014, ranked 23 out of 146 countries

== Geography ==
- Total area ranked 97 out of 249 countries
- Total coastline ranked 19 out of 148 not landlocked countries, with 15,147 km of coastline according to World Resources Institute

== Globalization ==
- KOF Index of Globalization 2014 ranked 23 out of 60 countries
- A.T. Kearney/Foreign Policy Magazine: Globalization Index 2006, ranked 32 out of 62 countries

== Health ==
- Physicians per 1000 population (OECD): 2007, ranked 1 out of 30 countries
- The World Health Organization's ranking of the world's health systems: 2000, ranked 14 out of 190 countries
- Preventable deaths (Health Affairs): 2008, ranked 7 out of 14 countries

== Industry ==
- OICA automobile production 2007, not ranked among top 51 countries

== Military ==
- Center for Strategic and International Studies: active troops ranked 29 out of 166 countries

== Political ==
- Transparency International: Corruption Perceptions Index 2015, ranked 58 out of 175 countries
- Reporters Without Borders 2015 Press Freedom Index, ranked 91 out of 180 countries
- The Economist Intelligence Unit Democracy Index 2014, ranked 41 out of 167 countries

== Society ==
- Economist Intelligence Unit Where-to-be-born Index 2013, ranked 34 out of 80 countries
- United Nations: Human Development Index 2014, ranked 29 out of 187 countries
- Save the Children: State of the World's Mothers report 2007, ranked 23 out of 110 countries
- World Health Organization: suicide rate, ranked 34 out of the 34 OECD countries

== Technology ==
- Brown University Taubman Center for Public Policy 2006: ranked 86 in online government services
- Number of broadband Internet users ranked 36
- Economist Intelligence Unit: E-readiness 2008, ranked 30 out of 45 countries
- World Economic Forum Networked Readiness Index 2007–2008, ranked 56 out of 127 countries
- World Intellectual Property Organization: Global Innovation Index 2026, ranked 41 out of 139 countries

== Tourism ==
- World Tourism Organization: World Tourism rankings 2007, ranked 16

== Historical data ==
Organization	Survey	Ranking
Institute for Economics and Peace	Global Peace Index	57 out of 144
United Nations Development Programme	Human Development Index 2009; Human Development Index 2006; Human Development Index 2004; Human Development Index 2000	25 out of 182; 18 out of 177; 24 out of 177; 24 out of 177
International Monetary Fund	GDP per capita (PPP)	18 out of 180
The Economist	Worldwide Quality-of-life Index, 2005	22 out of 111
The Heritage Foundation/Wall Street Journal	Index of Economic Freedom	57 out of 157
Reporters Without Borders	Worldwide Press Freedom Index 2006; Worldwide Press Freedom Index 2005; Worldwide Press Freedom Index 2004	32 out of 168; 18(tied) out of 168; 33 out of 167
Transparency International	Corruption Perceptions Index 2006; Corruption Perceptions Index 2005; Corruption Perceptions Index 2004	54 out of 163; 47 out of 158; 49 out of 145
World Economic Forum	Global Competitiveness Report	47 out of 125
Yale University/Columbia University	Environmental Sustainability Index 2005	67 out of 146
Nationmaster	Labor strikes	13 out of 27
A.T. Kearney / Foreign Policy	Globalization Index 2006; Globalization Index 2005; Globalization Index 2004	32 out of 62; 29 out of 62; 28 out of 62

== See also ==
- Lists of countries
- Lists by country
- List of international rankings
