= Environmental issues in Greece =

This page covers environmental issues in Greece.

== Acid rain ==
Acid rain in Greece, causes big damages in archeological monuments.

== Climate change ==
The climate of Greece is changing by way of increased drought, flooding, wildfires and sea level rise. These extreme weather conditions are likely to become more frequent and as a result landscapes and biodiversity will be affected. Climate change will also cause human activities such as land-use change, urbanisation and soil degradation to further affect Greek's ecosystems. Ecosystems in Greece are already at their tipping point, close to their environmental limits. Policies and laws have been put in place by the Greek government to try to manage these issues.

== Current policies ==
Greece is a signatory member of the Kyoto Protocol but there has been much sharp criticism from the failure to meet their intended targets for cutting carbon emissions. Many have claimed that policies have not been tough enough and the protocol has not been implemented in full owing to large business interests, though the government denies this. The government has also attracted sharp criticism about its waste management plans, as has the Mayor of Athens, though there are plans for new plants to be built to deal with the city's waste surplus. However, spatial planning that is being promoted for the protection of resources from exhaustion, destruction and pollution is part of a wider government plan addressing environmental issues. Many environmental issues in Greece are being solved with the help of the government.

The Athens Metro has also relieved some pressure in terms of car pollution in Athens and the planned Thessaloniki Metro will help the situation there too. The municipality of Athens has also announced a plan to deal with pollution in the city, though the exact details are as yet unknown.

== The European Union and international law ==
The European Union has sued the Greek national government several times due to its failure to uphold EU environmental standards. In 2002, the European Commission sued Greece for failing to take adequate steps to protect sea turtles on the island of Zakynthos. The ECJ ruled in favor of the Commission, stating that Greece "failed to fulfil its obligations under EC Treaty and Article 12(1)(b) and (d) of Council Directive 92/43/EEC of 21 May 1992 on the conservation of natural habitats and of wild fauna and flora." In the Court's words, Greece did not do enough to protect the sea turtle's breeding grounds.

In 2006, the Commission again sued Greece for failing to uphold Directive 92/43/EEC, claiming that the Greek government failed to protect the breeding grounds of vipers (Vipera schweizeri) on the island of Milos. The ECJ sided with the Commission.

In 2020, the Commission sued Greece for a third time, arguing that Greece failed to establish the 239 Sites of Community Importance identified in Commission Decision 2006/613/EC. Sites of Community Importance are areas designated by the European Union as being critical to maintaining biogeographical richness. The ECJ concurred, claiming that "the Hellenic Republic has failed to fulfil its obligations under Articles 4(4) and 6(1) of Council Directive 92/43/EEC of 21 May 1992 on the conservation of natural habitats and of wild fauna and flora, as amended by Council Directive 2006/105/EC of 20 November 2006."

The Greek coastal development law (2024) may trigger another case involving Greece and the European Commission.

The Protocol on Integrated Coastal Zone Management in the Mediterranean, which requires that signatories establish a minimum 100 meter setback zone, was ratified by the European Union in 2009. The Greek national government has not ratified the convention, but, as an EU member state, its current policies are in violation of the agreement.

== See also ==
- List of environmental issues
