= History of rail transport in Greece =

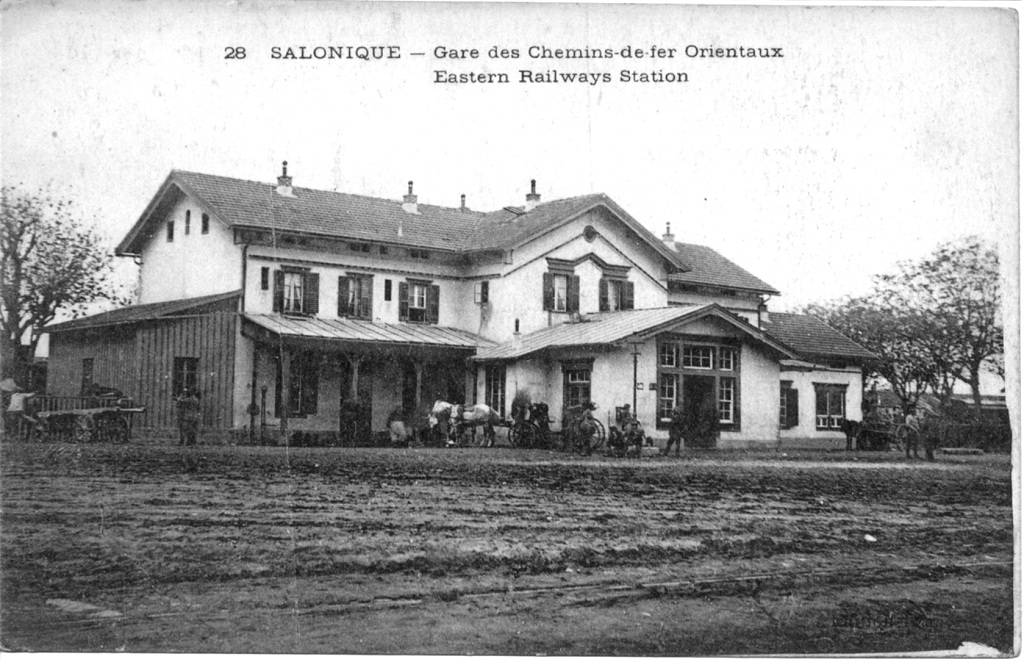
Thessaloniki (Salonique) railway station, Ottoman Eastern Railways, circa 1895–1910

The history of rail transport in Greece began in 1869, with the construction of the link between Piraeus and Athens with private funding.

The Greek railway network then developed slowly over time, at the initiative of private foreign companies, with the adoption of a four gauge network: 600, 750, 1,000 and 1,435 mm.

Some of the network was inherited as a result of annexation of Greek territory that had been part of the Ottoman Empire.

== See also ==
- History of rail transport
- Hellenic Railways Organisation
- History of Greece
- Rail transport in Greece
