= List of dances =

This is the main list of dances. It is a non-categorized, index list of specific dances. It may also include dances which could either be considered specific dances or a family of related dances. For example, ballet, ballroom dance and folk dance can be single dance styles or families of related dances.

See following for categorized lists:

- List of dance styles
- List of ethnic, regional, and folk dances by origin
- List of national dances

Categories listed on these specialized (categorized) lists should also be included in this general index.

== A ==
- Abayı
- Abbots Bromley Horn Dance
- Acharuli (Georgian folk dance)
- Acro dance
- Adana
- Adowa dance
- Affranchi (Haiti)
- Agbadza
- Agir Karadagi
- Agwara
- Ai Georgis
- Akogo
- Alanta dance
- Alkayida
- Allemande
- Amaggunju
- An Dro
- Angaliastos
- Angama (from Japan's Yaeyama Islands)
- Angelica
- Animal dance
- Antikristos
- Antipatitis
- 'Aparima
- Apu Inka
- Arab dance
- Aragonaise
- Arcan
- Ardah (Arab tribal war dance)
- Argentine Tango
- Arkan (Ukrainian, Hutsul)
- Armenian line dance
- Asma kasma
- Assiko
- Assyrian folk dance (Assyrian folk dances)
- Asyik
- Atilogwu
- Atsiapat
- Attan (Pashtun)
- Awki awki
- Azonto (Ghanaian dance)

== B ==
- Baagh Naach (Folk dance from Odisha, India)
- Bacchu-ber
- Bachata (Dominican Republic, Latin Club, Folk)
- Bachatango
- Bagurumba (Folk dance of Assam, North-east India)
- Baile de la Conquista
- Baishou Dance
- Bajidor Kahot
- Bakisimba
- Bal-musette
- Baladi
- Balboa (Swing)
- Ball dels Cossiers
- Ballet
- Ballo
- Ballos (Burçak tarlası oyunu) (Greece), (Turkey)
- Ballroom dance
- Ballu tundu (Sardinia)
- Bamboula
- Bandari dance
- Bar
- Barachum
- Bardo Chham (Folk dance of Arunachal, North-east India)
- Baris
- Barn dance
- Baroque dance
- Barynya (Russian, folk)
- Basse danse (also Basse-dance, Bassadanse, Bassadanze. French and Italian Renaissance dances)
- Basque dance
- Baton Twirling
- Batuque
- BBoying (Breakdance)
- Bear Dance
- Bedara Vesha
- Bedhaya
- Bélé
- Belly dance
- Beguine, dance of Caribbean origin
- Berd
- Bereznianka
- Bergamask (Be dance, from Bergamo, Italy)
- Bhagavata Mela
- Bhairab Naach
- Bhangra (Folk Dance of Northern India)
- Bharatanatyam (Indian classical dance)
- Big Apple (Line dance)
- Bihu dance (Folk dance of Assam, India)
- Binasuan
- Biyelgee (Mongolian)
- Bizhu dance
- Black Bottom (see Lindy Hop)
- Blues (Club dance, Swing)
- Bolero (American Ballroom, Cuban, European)
- Bollywood (Indian)
- Bomba (Ecuador)
- Bomba (Puerto Rico) (African, Caribbean)
- Bon Odori (Japanese)
- Bondar
- Boogaloo
- Boogie-woogie (Swing)
- Borborbor
- Border Morris
- Borrowdale (Zimbabweean, see Museve music)
- Bossa nova (Brazil, see Bossa nova music)
- Boston
  - Walking Boston
- Bourrée (historical)
- Branle (Bransle) (historical)
- Brazilian Zouk
- Breakaway (see Lindy Hop)
- Breakdancing
- Breton dance
- Buchaechum
- Bugaku
- Bugg (a swing dance from Sweden)
- Bump
- Bunny Hop
- Burlesque dance
- Buta Kola
- Butoh (Japanese)
- Butterfly dance (American contemporary)
- Buyō (Japanese)
- Bwola
- Byeongsin chum
- Bygdedans

== C ==
- Cabbage Patch
- Cachucha
- Cajun dance (Louisiana, United States Regional, Cajun)
  - Cajun Jig or Cajun One Step
  - Cajun Jitterbug and Two Step
- Cakalele
- Cakewalk (Swing)
- Calabrian Tarantella
- Calypso (Caribbean)
- Can-can (Cancan, can can)
- Canaries dance (historical, Renaissance, court)
- Candle dance
- Candombe (Uruguayan)
- Capoeira (dance and martial art, Brazil)
- Caporales (Bolivia)
- Carabinier (Haiti)
- Carimbó
- Cariñosa (dance of love) Philippines
- Carioca
- Carnavalito
- Carpaea
- Castle Walk
- Cat Daddy
- Căluş (Romanian ritual dance)
- Ceili dance
- Cendrawasih
- Ceroc (Modern Jive, Club)
- Chaabi (Moroccan Berber dance)
- Chacarera (Argentina)
- Cha cha cha or Cha cha (Cuba, Latin Ballroom Social)
- Chaconne
- Chaiti ghoda dance
- Chakacha
- Chakkirako
- Chamamé (Argentina, Brazil, Paraguay)
- Chang Lo
- Chapelloise
- Charikawi
- Charkula
- Charleston
- Chasapiko (Greece)
- Cheerleading
- Cheoyongmu
- Cheraw dance
- Chestnut
- Chicken Dance
- Chicken Noodle Soup
- Chhau dance (Folk dance of Odisha, India)
- Chhayam
- Chholiya
- Choobazi
- Choreia
- Choreography
- Chukano horo
- Chukchu
- Ch'unchu
- Chula (Southern Brazil)
- Chumak
- Chumba (Garifuna people in several Central America)
- Chunaengjeon
- Cibi
- Cilveloy
- Cinquepace, Cinque-pace
- Circassian Dance
- Circle dance
- Cirebon mask dance (Java, Indonesia)
- Clog dance (British)
- Clogging
- Clowning
- Clutha
- Cocek
- Cocolo
- Collegiate shag
- Compas (Haiti, Guadeloupe, Martinique)
- Competitive dance
- Concert dance
- Condong
- Conga
- Contact improvisation
- Contemporary dance
- Contra dance
- Cordax Greek / Roman erotic dance
- Cornish dance
- Corridinho
- Cossack dance
- Cotillion
- Country/western dance
- Country dance
- Country/Western Two-step
- Coupé-décalé
- Courante (historical)
- Court dance
- Crip walk
- Crnogorka (dance)
- Crpi voda, Jano
- Csárdás (Folk, Hungarian; also variants in Slovak dances, Rusyn dances, (Ukrainian dances, Lemko dances))
- Cuarteto (Argentina)
- Cuban rumba
- Cuban salsa
- Cueca (Argentina, Bolivia, Chile)
- Cumbia (Colombia, Club)
- Cumbia Villera (Argentina)
- Cupid Shuffle

== D ==
- Dab (America)
- Dabke (Arab folk dance native to the Levant)
- Daggering
- Dalkhai (Folk dance from Western Odisha, India)
- Dance of Osman Taka
- Dance video games (emotes from video games)
- Dancer's Delight (Scottish)
- Dances of Universal Peace
- Danda Nata (Folk dance from Odisha, India)
- Dandiya Raas
- Danza de los Viejitos
- Danza de los Voladores
- Danza de tijeras (Peru)
- Danzantes de Levanto
- Danzón
- Dappankuthu
- Dashing White Sergeant
- Daychovo horo
- Deer dance
- Deknni
- Deodhani dance
- Devil's Sword Dance
- Dhaanto
- Dhalo (from Goa, éIndia)
- Dhamail or Dhamal (from Sylhet, Bangladesh)
- Dhimsa
- Diablada (Bolivia, Chile, Peru)Dab
- Dilan (a Kurdish dance, Iran, Turkey, Iraq)
- Dingi dingi
- Dipat
- Dirk dance
- Disco
- Discofox
- Djolé
- Do-si-do
- Dollu Kunitha
- Domkach
- Domni
- Double bugg (a swing dance from Sweden)
- Dougie
- Dragon dance
- Duke of Perth
- Dumhal
- Dunhuang dance
- Duranguense
- Dutty Wine - a West Indian, Dancehall-inspired dance

== E ==
- Earsdon Sword Dance
- East Coast Swing
- Écossaise
- Ecstatic dance
- Edonga
- Egg dance
- Eisa
- Ekitaguriro
- Ekizino
- Electro dance
- Electric Slide
- Endeka Kozanis
- English Country Dance
- Engolo (combines dancing and martial arts)
- Entarisi ala benziyor
- Entogoro
- Errenzhuan
- Eskista
- Espringale
- Etighi
- Ewoya Dance

== F ==
- Fa'ataupati
- Fan dance (Chinese or burlesque)
- Fandango (Spain)
- Fanga
- Farandole (Provençal)
- Faroese dance
- Farruca
- Festejo
- Figure skating
- Fisounis
- Flamenco (Spanish/Roma)
- Floss (Western)
- Folk dance
- Formation dance
- Forró (dance from northeast of Brazil)
- Foxtrot (Ballroom Social)
- Freak dancing
- The Freddy
- Frevo
- Frug
- Freestyle
- Fugdi
- Funaná
- Furiant
- Furlana

== G ==
- Gainjeonmokdan
- Gair dance
- Gaitanaki
- Galliard
- Galop
- Gambols
- Gambuh
- Gammaldans
- Gandrung
- Ganggangsullae
- Gankino (Bulgaria)
- Gangnam Style
- Gankino horo
- Ganggangsullae
- Garadi
- Garba (folk dance of state of Gujarat, India)
- Garland dance
- Gato (Argentina, Uruguay)
- Gaudiya Nritya (West Bengal, India)
- Gaur Maria Dance
- Gavotte (Brittany), Gavot (historical)
- Gay Gordons
- Gending Sriwijaya
- Geommu
- Gerontikos
- Ghoomar (Folk Dance of Rajasthan, Northern India)
- Ghumura Dance (Folk dance of Kalahandi, Orissa/Odisha, India).
- Giddha (Folk dance of Northern India)
- Gigue
- Giknas
- Gluvo-nemo
- Gombey (Bermuda)
- Gombhira
- Goravara Kunitha
- Goria dance
- Goseong ogwangdae
- Gotipua (Odisha, India)
- Grancharsko horo
- Grida dance
- Griddy
- Grinding
- Grizzly Bear
- Guaguancó
- Guapacha
- Gulewamkulu
- Gumboot dance (Africa)
- Gusharaveli

== H ==
- Hacha'a
- Hai-hak dance
- Haka
- Hakken (Dutch)
- Halay (Turkish, Folk)
- Halling
- Hambo (Scandinavian, Folk)
- Hand jive
- Hardcore Dancing (Urban American Hardcore)
- Harlem Shake
- Hasapiko (Greece)
- Headbanging
- Highland dancing
- Hip hop dance
- Hiragasy
- Historical dance
- Hitch hike
- Hivinau
- Hoedown
- Hojagiri
- Hokey Pokey, also known as Hokey-cokey, Okey-cokey
- Holubka
- Hootchy-Kootchy
- Hopak (Ukrainian)
- Hopak-Kolom
- Hop-tu-Naa
- Hora (many named versions; folk, Bulgarian, Israeli, Romanian, Ukrainian)
- Horon (Turkish, Folk)
- Hornpipe (Ireland)
- House dance
- Huaconada
- Huapango
- Huayno (Peru)
- Hula
- Hulivesha
- Hully Gully
- Humppa (see Music of Finland)
- Hunguhungu
- Hustle and its variant, New York Hustle (Club)
  - Latin Hustle
- Hutsulka
- Hyporchema

== I ==
- Ikariotikos (Greece)
- Improv Tribal Style Belly Dance
- Indlamu
- Innaby
- Intercessory dance
- International folk dance
- Interpretive dance
- Irish dance
- Irish Sean-Nós Dance
- Irish Stepdance
- Isios
- Isos Sinasos
- Israeli folk dancing

== J ==
- Ja'i
- Janger
- Jangi
- Jarabe tapatío
- Jarana yucateca
- Java
- Jazz dance
- Jenkka
- Jerkin'
- Jhijhiya
- Jhum dance
- Jhumair
- Jhumar
- Jig Ireland
- Jig (Scottish country)
- Jitterbug (Swing)
  - Cajun Jitterbug
  - Jitterbug Stroll (Line dance, Swing)
- Jive (Ballroom, International Latin)
- Joged (Indonesian)
- Joget
- John Wall dance
- Jookin
- Jota (Spanish dance)
- Jove Malaj Mome (Bulgarian folk dance)
- Juego de maní
- Jumpstyle (Techno based dance)

== K ==
- Kabasaran
- Kachāshī (Okinawa, Japan)
- Kakilambe
- Kalamatianos (Greece)
- Kalbelia
- Kalikapatadi
- Kalymnikos (Greece)
- Kamarinskaya (Russia)
- Kamilierikos
- Kamrupi dance
- Kancet Papatai
- Kandyan Dance( Kandy, Sri Lanka)
- Kanella
- Kangeli
- Kangilu
- Kaosikii dance
- Kapitan Louka
- Karakattam
- Karana
- Karikázó
- Karma Naach
- Karsilamas
  - Entarisi ala benziyor
- Kastorianos
- Kaşık Havası
- Kathak (Classical Indian dance)
- Kathakali (India, incorporates dance)
- Katsabadianos
- Kebyar duduk
- Kecak
- Kechagiadikos
- Keisabadi (Folk dance from Odisha, India)
- Kenshibu
- Kerala Natanam (Indian dance created by Guru Gopinath)
- Kerkiraikos
- Khaleegy
- Khanchobany
- Khasapiko (Greece)
- Khattak Dance (Pashtun)
- Khigga (Assyrian folk dance)
- Khon (Thai dance)
- Khorovod (Russia)
- Khorumi
- Kikkli
- Kizomba (Angola)
- Klezmer (Ashkenazi Jewish)
- Klompendansen (Dutch)
- Kochari
- Koftos (Greece)
- Kolannalu
- Kolata
- Kolbasti (Turkey)
- Kolo (Slavic)
- Kolomyjka (Ukrainian)
- Kontradans (Haiti)
- Kopačka
- Kopanitsa (Bulgaria)
- Körtánc
- Kotsari or Kochari (Armenian: Քոչարի; Turkish: Koçari; Greek: Κότσαρι; Georgian: ქოჩარი; Laz: Koçari; Azerbaijani: Köçəri)
- Koutsos
- Kōwakamai
- Kozachok (Ukrainian)
- Kpanlogo
- Krakowiak (Poland)
- Krishnanattam (India)
- Kromanti dance
- Krumping
- Kuchipudi (Classical Indian dance)
- Kuda Lumping
- Kuduro
- Kujawiak (Poland)
- Kullawada
- Kumi Odori
- Kumina
- Kummi
- Kurdish dance (Iran and Iraq)
- Kwassa kwassa

== L ==
- Lafina
- Lahasua
- Lakalaka
- Lambada
- Lambeth Walk
- Lambri Kamara
- Lap dance
- Larakaraka
- Lasya
- Latin dance
- Lavani (Indian, Maharashtra)
- Ländler (Austria)
- Lebang Boomani dance
- Legényes
- Legong
- Lerikos (Greece)
- LeRoc (Modern Jive, Ceroc)
- Les Lanciers
- Letkajenkka (also known as Letkis, Letkajenka, Letkiss, Letka-Enka, Let's Kiss Jenka, La Yenka)
- Leventikos (Greece)
- Lezginka (Russian Caucasus Region)
- Lezim
- Likok Pulo
- Limbo (dancers pass under horizontal pole)
- Linđo
- Lindy Hop (Swing)
- Line dance
- Lion dance
- Lipothymiarikos
- Liscio (Italian traditional music and dance inspired to Waltz, Polka and Mazurka)
- Llamerada
- Locking
- Long Sword
- Loulouvikos
- Loure (historical)
- Lyrical dance

== M ==
- Maanch
- Macarena (Spain)
- Maculelê
- Madison (Line dance)
- Maglalatik (Folk Dance of Philippines)
- Mahari dance
- Mak Inang
- Makedonia
- Makedonikos antikristos
- Makrinitsa dance
- Mak Sa'moa
- Mako
- Malaguena
- Malhão
- Malwai Giddha
- Mambo (American Ballroom, of Cuban origin)
- Mamita
- Mandilatos
- Maniatikos
- Manipuri (Classical Indian Dance)
- Mapalé
- Mapouka
- Mardana Jhumair
- Marinera (Peru)
- Mascherata
- Mashed Potato
- Masque
- Matachin (Matachines)
- Matki dance
- Māʻuluʻulu
- Maypole dance
- Maxixe (Social)
- Mazur (dance) (Poland)
- Mazurka (Poland)
- Medieval dance
- Meʻetuʻupaki
- Meke
- Melbourne Shuffle (Australia)
- Menora
- Merengue (Latin Club)
- Méringue (Haiti)
- Metelytsia ((Ukrainian), khorovod)
- Metsovitikos
- Mihanikos
- Milonga (see Argentine Tango)
- Minuet
- Mirzayi
- Mixer dance
- Mizmar
- Modern dance
- Modern Jive
- Mohiniyattam (Indian classical dance)
- Molly dance
- Monferrina
- Monodiplos
- Moonwalker
- Moraego
- Morenada (Bolivia)
- Moresca
- Moreška
- Morris dance
- Mosak sulmani dance
- Moshing
- Mpougatsas
- Mugo
- Muiñeira (Galicia, Spain)
- Mujra
- Mule
- Murga (Argentina, Uruguay, Spain)
- Mussoll
- Mwanzele

== N ==
- Nabichum
- Nacnī (Folk dance from Odisha/Orissa)
- Nae Nae
- Naleyo
- Namgen
- Napoloni
- Nati
- Newa dance
- New Vogue
- Niiko
- Nijemo Kolo
- Nizamikos
- Novelty and fad dances
- Ntames
- Ntournerakia
- Nutbush

== O ==
- O Nikolos
- Oberek (also called Obertas or Ober, Poland)
- Odissi
- Okemea.k.a.* Orissi (Odisha, India)
- Odzemek
- Ohafia War Dance
- Ohangla dance
- Ojapali (folk dance from Assam, India)
- Okayama
- Okumkpa
- Oleg
- Omal
- One-Step
- Oro (eagle dance)
- Orunyege-Ntogoro
- Oruro Diablada
- 'ote'a
- Otole dance
- ʻotuhaka
- Owa dance

== P ==
- P'aquchi
- Pa'o'a
- Pachanga
- Padayani
- Padhar dance
- Pagode
- Paidushko horo
- Pakurumo
- Palamakia
- Palo de Mayo (Nicaragua), Afro-Caribbean influence, not to be confused with Maypole dance
- Pambiche
- Pandanggo
- Pangalay
- Panthi (Folk dance of Chhattisgarh, India)
- Pantsula (South Africa)
- Panyembrama
- Para Para
- Parai Attam
- Partalos
- Participation dance
- Partner dance
- Passacaglia (Passacaille) (historical)
- Passepied (historical)
- Pasillo
- Pasodoble (Spanish Ballroom, International Latin)
- Pavane (historical)
- Pavri Nach
- Peabody (ballroom)
- Peacock dance
- Peewee style (originated by Pee-wee Herman in Pee-wee's Big Adventure)
- Pembe
- Pendet
- Pentozali (Greece)
- Perini Shivatandavam
- Perinița
- Perkhuli
- Persian dance (Iran)
- Petrunino Horo
- Phulpati dance
- Picking Up Sticks
- Pidikhtos (Greece)
- Pilioritikos
- Pirgousikos
- Piva
- Pizzica
- Plataniotiko Nero
- Plena
- Poco-poco
- Podaraki
- Pogo (A punk dance, consisting of jumping up and down)
- Pogonishte
- Pole dancing
- Polka - many named versions (Ballroom, Folk, Historical)
- Polka-mazurka
- Polonaise
- Pols (Norway, Folk, see Polska)
- Polska (pl.: Polskor; Sweden, Folk)
- Pom Squad
- Pony
- Popping
- Pop, Lock, and Drop It (Hip hop dance)
- Potrčulka
- Poustseno
- Povrateno
- Pravo
- Prophetic dance
- Proskinitos
- Pryvit (Ukrainian)
- Puliyattam
- Pung cholom
- Punta (Honduras)
- Pyrrhichios (Dance from Pontos; Greek Black Sea)

== Q ==
- Qhapaq Qulla
- Quadrille
- Queer Tango
- Quickstep (Ballroom)
- Quebradita (Mexico)

== R ==
- Raas
- Raibenshe
- Rain dancing
- Ramvong (Cambodia)
- Rapper sword
- Raqs sharqi
- La Raspa
- Raut Nacha (Folk dance of Chhattisgarh, India)
- Rebetiko dances (Greece)
- Red River Jig (Canadian Métis)
- Redowa
- Reel (Irish and Scottish)
- Regency dance
- Reggada
- Rejang dance
- Renaissance dance
- Reog
- Rhumba (a.k.a. ballroom rumba; International Latin & American Rhythm)
  - Cuban rumba (Cuba)
- Rigaudon
- Rinkafadda
- Robam Meh Ambao
- Robam Neary Chea Chuor
- Robam Tep Apsara
- Robot dance
- Rock and Roll
  - Acrobatic Rock'n'Roll
- Rodat
- Roger de Coverley
- Rom kbach
- Romvong
- Ronggeng
- Round dance (two kinds: circular chain, couples)
- Rougatsiarikos
- Rudl
- Rugovo

== S ==
- Sabaragamu Dance(Sabaragamuwa Province, Sri Lanka)
- Sadi Moma
- Sagayan
- Salegy
- Salsa (Latin Club)
  - Salsa Rueda (Latin Club, Round)
- Saltarello
- Saman
- Samba
  - Samba de Gafieira
- Samba (ballroom dance)
- Sambai
- Sammi
- Sanding
- Sanghyang
- Sangini
- Sangrai dance
- Sapera
- Sarabande (Saraband)
- Sârbă
- Sardana (Catalonia)
- Sattriya dance (Assam, India)
- Schottische
- Schuhplattler
- Scottish country dance
- Scottish highland dance
- Sean-Nós Dance (Ireland - Irish Dance in Sean Nós "Old Style")
- Seann triubhas
- Seguidilla (Spanish, folk)
- Semba (Angola)
- Sequence dance
- Serpent dance
- Serra (Greece)
- Set Dance Ireland
- Seungjeonmu
- Seungmu
- Sevillanas (Spain)
- Sewang dance
- Shag (Swing)
  - Carolina shag
  - Collegiate shag
  - St. Louis shag
- Shake
- Shalakho
- Shim Sham (Line dance)
- Shimmy
- Shota
- Sianos
- Siklla
- Simd
- Simeriani
- Singhi Chham
- Singkil
- Single Swing (Single Time Swing)
- Singo Ulung
- Sirmpa
- Sirtaki (Syrtaki, Zorba) (Greece)
- Sivas bar
- Skank (dance)
- Ski ballet
- Skip jive
- Skočná
- Slängpolska (Sweden, Folk, see Polska)
- Slip jig (Ireland)
- Slow dance
- Slow Foxtrot - also known as Foxtrot and Slowfox (Ballroom)
- Snoa
- Social dance
- Soke
- Sokkie
- Solomon Islands dance
- Son (Mayan, Guatemala/Mexico)
- Šopka
- Sōran Bushi
- Sousedská
- Sousta (Greece)
- Špacírka
- Sperveri
- Springar
- Square dance
- Square dance (Modern western)
- Square dance (Traditional)
- Stage diving
- Stamoulo
- Stanky Legg (GS Boys)
- Starotikveško
- Stave dancing
- Step dance (Ireland)
- Stiletto dance (American contemporary solo dance)
- Stomp dance
- Strathspey
- Street dance
- The Strictly (British television dance)
- Striptease
- Strip the willow
- Subli
- Suleiman Aga
- Sundanese dance
- Surra de Bunda
- Suscia
- Swing (both as family of dances and as specific Texas dance)
- Sword dance
- Syrtos (Greece)
  - Kalamatianos Syrtos (Mainland Syrtos) (Greece)

== T ==
- Taepyeongmu
- Tahtib
- Tambor
- Tambourin (Provençal)
- Tamena Ibuga
- Tamure
- Tamzara
- Tandava (India)
- Tanggai dance
- Tango (Argentina) (Ballroom, Social, Club)
  - Argentine Tango - also known as Tango Argentino (Social)
  - Uruguayan Tango - also known as Tango Uruguayo (Social)
  - Ballroom Tango - competitive and social dance styles
  - Brazilian Tango - see Maxixe
  - Finnish tango
- Thirayattam (Indian Ethnic dance)
- Thiriyuzhichil
- Tanggai dance
- Tanoura (Egyptian dance)
- Tap Charleston (see Lindy Hop)
- Tap dance
- Tapeinos horos
- Tarakama
- Tarantella (Italian, folk)
- Tatsia
- Tau'olunga (Tongan or Samoan - Polynesian origins)
- Tautoga
- Ta Xila
- Tecktonik ("tck")
- Teke zortlatmasi
- Tello
- Temani (Israeli Jewish dance)
- Temuraga
- Tertali
- Teshkoto
- Texas Tommy (see Lindy Hop)
- Thabal chongba
- Thidambu Nritham
- Thirayattam
- Thirra
- The Thistle (Scottish ladies' solo step dance))
- Tiger dance
- Tinikling (Philippines)
- Time Warp
- Tinku (Bolivia, Peru)
- Tobas
- Tondero (Peru)
- Topeng dance
- Tourdion (historical)
- Toycular yarcan
- Toyi-toyi
- Traditional dance
- Tranky Doo (Swing, Line dance)
- Tranos Choros
- Trata (Greece)
- Trepak (The Nutcracker) (Russian dance; character dance from the ballet The Nutcracker)
- Tresenica
- Tribal Style Belly Dance
- Tripuri dances
- Trizalis
- Troika (Folk, Russian, Cajun)
- Trojak
- Tromakton
- Tropak (folk)
- Tropanka
- Tropotianka
- Trump Dance
- Tsakonikos (Greece)
- Tsamiko (Greece)
- Tsestos
- Tsifteteli (Tsifte-Teli) (Çifte-telli) (Turkish) (Greece)(Romani)(Arabic)
- Tsiniaris
- Tufo
- Tumba francesa
- Tutsa Naga
- Tutting
- Twerking
- Twist
- Two-step
  - Cajun Two Step
  - Country/Western Two-step
  - Nightclub two-step - also known as California Two-step, abbrn: NC2S
  - Progressive Double Two
- Twoubadou (Haiti)
- Tyrolienne

== U ==
- Ukrainian dance
- Ula
- Ulek mayang
- 'upa'upa, claimed to be the origin of merengue music and dance
- Uprock (as known as Rock Dance or Rocking)
- Ura
- Urban Dance
- Uzundara

== V ==
- Vallja e cobanit
- Valse à deux temps
- Van papuri
- Varsovienne
- Vayia Strose kai Louloudia
- Veeragase
- Veeranatyam
- Verbunkos
- Vesnianky
- Vintage dance
- Vira
- Virginia reel
- Vlečenoto
- Vogue (dance)
- Volkspele
- Volta (dance)

== W ==
- Waacking
- Waka waka
- Waltz
  - Cross-step waltz
  - International standard waltz
  - Peruvian waltz
  - Venezuelan waltz
  - Viennese waltz
- War dance
- Wari
- Watusi (fad dance)
- Wayang wong
- Weapon dance
- West Coast Swing ("WCS"; Swing, United States)
- Western swing (United States)
  - Sophisticated Swing (an older name of WCS)
- Western promenade dance
- Whirling
- Wilt thou go to the barracks, Johnny?
- Winterguard
- Wolosso (Ivory Coast)
- Worship dance

== X ==
- Xaxado
- Xibelani (traditional Shangaan (South Africa))

== Y ==
- Yablochko (Russian, folk)
- Yakshagana (Karnataka, India)
- Yangge
- Yarkhushta
- Yein
- Yingge dance
- YMCA
- Yosakoi (Japanese)
- Youz bir
- Yove male mome
- Yowlah (rifle dance from UAE)
- Yup'ik dancing
- Yurukikos

== Z ==
- Zaharoula
- Zamacueca
- Zamba (Argentina)
- Zambra
- Zaouli
- Zapateado (Mexico)
- Zapateado (Spain)
- Zapin (Malay traditional dancing, Malaysia)
- Zarambeque
- Zaramo
- Zeybek dance
- Zeibekiko
- Zervodexios
- Zervos
- Zeybek dance
- Zonaradiko (Thrace)
- Zorba's dance, another name for Sirtaki (of Greek origin)
- Zouk (Guadeloupe, Martinique, Haiti, Brazil)
- Zwiefacher (Germany)
- Zydeco (Louisiana, U.S.)

== See also ==
- Glossary of dance moves
- Index of dance articles
- Outline of dance, a list of general dance topics in our world today and from history.
