= 岡山 =

岡山, meaning “ridge, mountain”, may refer to:

- Gangshan (disambiguation), the Chinese transliteration
- Okayama (disambiguation), the Japanese transliteration
