= Music of Thrace =

Music of a Southeast European region

The music of Thrace, a region in Southeastern Europe spread over southern Bulgaria (Northern Thrace), northeastern Greece (Western Thrace), and European Turkey (Eastern Thrace), contains a written history that extends back to the antiquity, when Orpheus became a legendary musician and lived close to Olympus. Though the Thracian people were eventually assimilated by surrounding Balkan groups, elements of Thracian folk music continue.

Traditional Thracian dances are usually swift in tempo. They are mostly circle dances in which the men dance at the front of the line. The gaida, a kind of bagpipe, is the most characteristic instrument, but clarinets and toumbelekis are also used. The Thracian gaida, also known in ancient Greece as askaulos, is different from the Macedonian or other Bulgarian bagpipes. It is higher in pitch then the Macedonian gaida but less so than the Bulgarian gaida (or Dura). The Thracian gaida is also still widely used throughout Thrace in northeastern Greece.

== Types of dances ==
- Chelebinsko (Chain Dance of the Gentlemen): is a choreography by Belco Stanev with great music in an interesting meter. It's 9/8 divided : 2 3 2 2. In the vocal part, the steps are exactly on the meter: QSQQ, but in the instrumental refrain, half a bar is added 2 3 (QS). The steps are in 2 2 2 3 (QQQS) and the missing half bar 2 2 (QQ) is added at the end so that is missing (mathematically).
- Izgryala E Mesechinka (The moon has risen): A beautiful song from Northern (Bulgarian) Thrace that has inspired many choreographies, all of them with extensive arm work that is typical in dances from this region.
- Jambolsko Paidushko: Pajdusko/Paidushko Horo/Baiduska, is a group of dances usually danced in a 5/16 or 5/8 (Q S) rhythm and found in a large area spanning Serbia, Macedonia, Bulgaria, Greece, and beyond. It resembles the "aksak" (Turkish for limping) rhythmic system. Its various forms reflect local preferences. This one is from the Jambol region in Northern (Bulgarian) Thrace, and was first introduced in the United States by Dick Crum.
- Krivo Sadovsko Horo (Twisted chain dance from Sadovo, Northern Thrace): is a very fast dance, in a 13/8 rhythm, this dance has many versions.
- Pazardzhishka Kopanitsa: Pazardzhik Kopanitsa from Pazardzhik, Northern Thrace.
- Pravo Trakiisko Horo: Pravo Trakiisko Horo (Straight Thracian chain dance) is from Northern Thrace. It has very little in common with the simple Pravo Horo (straight chain dance). It's a challenging choreography by a performing group that was brought down from the stage.
- Sedi Donka (Donka is sitting): One of the most unusual musical patterns in Bulgaria, Sedi Donka is in 25/16 meters. It is subdivided 7+7+11, which in turn can be subdivided 3 2 2, 3 2 2, 2 2 3 2 2.
- Trakiiska Rachenitsa: Trakiiska Rachenitsa is a highly stylized rachenitsa from Northern Thrace with much arm work.
- Trite Pati: Trite Pati (the three times) is a dance from Northern Thrace. Like some other Thracian dances, it is also danced in Western (Greek) Thrace. It has many similarities with stis treis dance from Manastir villages and Kavakli (Topolovgrad). Stis treis is the Greek version of the dance and it's mentioned below.
- Kuluriastos: Kuluriastos is a Greek dance from Western Thrace. It has a slower Zonaradikos part, and a faster part where the beginning of the line loops into the center and back out again. It's a lot of fun to dance this, especially if the dancer is near the beginning of the line. As with many Greek dances, it can be danced to multiple songs.
- Sfarlis: Sfarlis is a beginner's dance from Western Thrace.
- Troiro: A fast dance from Northern Thrace, from the Boyalik villages. It is one of the most difficult Greek dances of Thrace. Many Bulgarian dances from Northern Thrace have "cousins" (very similar dances) in Western (Greek) Thrace, and this is one of them: a Greek dance that sounds and feels Bulgarian.
- Dostlar Bizim Halaya: This is a rom dance from Eastern (Turkish) Thrace. It is a reminder of the so-called "tsigansko horo" (gypsy chain dance), but the dances are not at all alike.
- Hassapia: an ancient dance that simulates a stealth approach on any enemy camp, from beginning to victory. The hassapia dance has been dated back to Hellenistic times, before the time of Alexander the Great whose soldiers brought it to Macedonia. It is a warrior's dance in which the movements represent the noiseless approach on the enemy camp, the encounter, the fight, and the victory. This dance is done in a circle using a shoulder hold. A similar dance called "kasapsko horo" (butcher's chain dance) is performed in Bulgaria.
- Kallinitikos: performed by three people (either two men and one woman or two women and one man), named after the kalines, or friends of the bride during her wedding, who escort her to the church performing this dance. Kallinitikos is a dance done by groups of three people: a man in the middle and two women at his sides or a woman in the middle and two men at her sides. The dance is named after the kalines, the bride's girlfriends, who do this dance as they escort her to the church. Performed in Western Thrace.
- Kouseftos: derived from kousevo (to run in the Ancient Thracian language), performed, not in a circle, but in the form of a labyrinth Kouseftos, with its characteristic quick running steps, takes its name from the word kousevo in Ancient Thrace which means to run. It differs from other Thracian dances in that, instead of being danced in a circle, its dance progression takes the form of a labyrinth. Performed in Western Thrace.
- Mandilatos (Sygkathistos): a couples dance performed at weddings. Mandilatos is a couples' dance which takes its name from the mandilia or handkerchiefs that the dancers hold while dancing. This dance is done at weddings as the guests escort the bride or the best man to the church. During the procession, some guests hold a mirror which symbolizes the purity of the bride and others hold brooms which symbolize her housekeeping ability. This dance is performed in Western Thrace. A similar dance called "rachenitsa" (from "raka" - an arm) is performed in Northern Thrace.
- Stis tris: a slow but swift dance. Stis Tris means "in threes." Each dance set is composed of three parts of four steps each. The arms are held down and move in a synchronized motion with the steps. This dance is performed under different names in Northern Thrace and Western Thrace. It has many similarities with Trite pati and technically they are versions of the same dance, one Greek and one Bulgarian.
- Sygkathistos: performed as the bride and groom are escorted to and from the church during weddings. Syngathistos is a free style couples dance that is danced as the bride and groom are escorted to and from the church. The bridal party also dances as they display and exchange gifts with the bride and groom, particularly gifts of handkerchiefs and head scarves. This dance is performed in Western Thrace.
- Xesyrtos: a circle dance with men performed at the front of the line. Xesyrtos is a circle dance in which the men dance at the front of the line, followed by the women, and do variations to the dance step with characteristic slaps, jumps, and kicks. This dance is performed in Western Thrace.
- Zonaradikos: a circle dance in which the participants (usually men) hold each other's belts. It is one of the primary dances of Western Thrace, where a variety of dance moves are performed. The Zonaradikos is dance in which the participants hold each other by their belts or zonaria (hence the name Zonaradikos). The three variations of the basic movements are: paties or stomps, monopatia or single stomp, and psalidia or scissors; usually followed by the koulouriastos or curling. A similar dance called "na poyas" (for belt) is found in Northern Thrace.
- Dousko Zonaradiko-Tsestos: Dousko is the zonaradiko of Northern Thrace. Tsestos is the dance that comes after dousko and they are danced together. Tsestos is a challenging twelve-step dance from Northern Thrace, also known as Eastern Rumelia (today's Bulgaria) that is performed by both men and women. It begins as a moderate tempo dance with very limited dance figures (this part is named Dousko, the steps are almost the same as in the Zonaradiko dance). As it unfolds, the men come in the front and they clutch each other by the belt (zonari). At this point, the dance becomes very swift and intense and consists of a plethora of dance figures. Its origins can be traced to an ancient Greek dance, Pyrihios, which is a twelve-step dance too. Bulgarian Trakiisko Pravo Horo has many similarities with Dousko Zonaradiko Tsestos.
- Paydushko (Baiduska, Pajdusko, Pajduska, Payduska): a very aggressive dance, usually performed by men. It is associated with fierce and intense dance moves. Performed in all three regions of Thrace: Northern (Paidushko Horo), Western (Baiduska), and Eastern (payduska). The dance has some differences between regions.
- Halay: Halay is a famous dance in the Middle East. It is a symbol of the tempestuous way of life in its place of origin, Anatolia. It is a national dance in Armenia and Turkey. The traditional form of the Halay dance is played on the Zurna, supported by a Davul. The dancers form a circle or line while holding each other by the little finger. From Anatolia, the Halay has spread to other regions, such as Armenia and the Balkans.
- Karsilama: a dance found in both Western and Eastern Thrace.

== Listen to ==
- Ancient Greek Bagpipe (Askaulos) Improvisation by Giannis Pantazis
- Pazardjishka kopanitsa
- Krivo sadovsko horo
- Paydushko horo
- Alexander and the King (Thrace) (feat. Vangelis Dimoudis)
- Izgryala e mesechinka
- Yambolsko Trite Puti
- Eleftheria Arvanitaki - Do sta lianohortaroudia (Zonaradiko)
- Pajdusko (Balkan Guzeli)
- Tricked by the Birds (Thrace) (feat. Vangelis Dimoudis)
- Pajdusko (Balkan Guzeli) - Turkish Lyrics
- Alan Cayirlari
- Musical Travelogue with Domna Samiou in Thrace, Evros
- Trite Puti
- Mandilatos(Mandra)
- Hijaz Mandilatos(Hicaz Mandra)
- Kazım Koyuncu - Tabancamın Sapını(Mandilatos-Mandra havası)
- A Bre Suluman Aga
- Dousko Zonaradiko-Tsestos Greek Dance
