= Guapacha =

Guapacha may refer to one of the following

- Guapachá, a style of Cuban music, a variant of guaracha
- Amado Borcelá (1934–1966), Cuban singer known as "Guapachá"
- Guapacha timing, timing in cha-cha-cha steps
- Guapacha (dance), modern fusion of hip-hop and cha-cha-cha
