= Paoa =

Paoa may refer to:

- Pa'o'a, a Tahitian dance
- Pāoa, the eponymous ancestor of the Ngāti Pāoa iwi of the Hauraki Gulf, New Zealand
- Paoa Kahanamoku (1890–1968), Hawaiian swimmer, surfer and actor
- Paoa, in Hawaiian religion, a figure related to the goddess Hiʻiaka

== See also ==
- Paoay
