= Boston (dance) =

The Boston refers to various step dances, considered a slow Americanized version of the waltz presumably named after where it originated. It is completed in one measure with the weight kept on the same foot through two successive beats. The "original" Boston is also known as the New York Boston or Boston Point.

Variations of the Boston include:

- The Long Boston also known as the Philadelphia Boston, the Walking Boston or the One Step Waltz.
- The One-Step.
- The Short Boston,.
- The Dip Boston, also known as Boston dip (steps of the dance were accentuated through a bend of the knees, with the center of gravity "dipping").
- The Spanish Boston
- The French Boston
- The Herring Bone Boston
- The English Boston or Three-Step Boston.
- The Four-Step Boston or Four-Step Waltz.
- The Five-Step Boston or Five-Step Waltz.
- The Seven-Step Boston.
- The Double Boston or Cross Boston or Count of Luxembourg Staircase Valse
- The Triple Boston
- The Triple Double Boston
- The Russian Boston
