= Ball dels Cossiers =

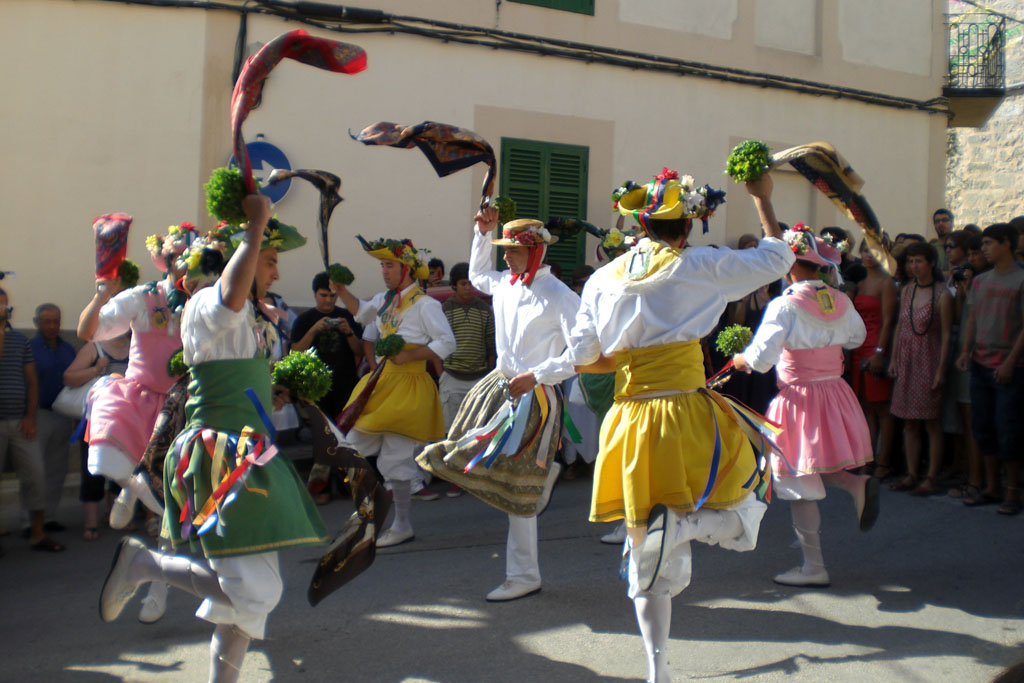
Cossiers of Montuïri on the day of Saint Bartholomew

The Ball dels Cossiers (Catalan for "Dance of the Cossiers") is the most popular traditional dance on the island of Majorca, in the Spanish Balearic Islands. In the dance, three pairs of dancers, who are typically male, defend a representation of good, the "Lady," who is played by a man or a woman, from a demon. Normally the dance is done in a circle, with the Lady in the center, although some more solemn dance troupes (such as La Oferta, the Mocadors, the Bandanas, or the Mercançó) deviate from this tradition. The ball dels cossiers is traditionally performed at festivals, fiestas, and other public events.

== History ==
The ball dels cossiers has been found on Majorca since the 14th century, when it was brought to the island from Catalonia following the Aragonian conquest of the island under King Jaime I. The earliest recorded evidence for the dance has been found in a 1544 manuscript in Sóller. However, some scholars argue that the dance has its roots in pagan nature spirit worshiping rituals native to the island, and that the modern dance is a synthesis of these ancient rituals and relatively modern Catalan traditions.

Because of Francisco Franco's repression of Majorcan and Catalan culture, the dance all but disappeared during the 20th century. However, it began to be revived in 1962, when Spanish film director José María Oliveira began hosting performances at his hotel in Palma and supporting local dance troupes. This revival has continued into the 21st century, as tourists and local governments have developed an interest in the dance. However, it is still nowhere near as widespread as it once was, as the ball dels cossiers is only practiced in Palma and five other towns and villages on Majorca — Manacor, Alaró, Algaida, Montuïri and Inca.
