= Okayama (disambiguation) =

Okayama is the capital city of Okayama Prefecture in the Chūgoku region of Japan.

Okayama may also refer to:

== Locations ==
- Okayama Domain, a Japanese feudal domain of the Edo period, located in modern-day Okayama Prefecture
- Okayama Prefecture, a prefecture in Japan

== People ==
- Amane Okayama (岡山 天音, Okayama Amane, born 1994), Japanese actor
- Kazunari Okayama (born 1978), a Japanese soccer football player
- Saeko Okayama (岡山 沙英子, Okayama Saeko, born 1982), Japanese long jumper
- Tomoki Okayama (岡山 智樹, Okayama Tomoki, born 1996), Japanese actor

== Sports ==
- Fagiano Okayama F.C., a football (soccer) club from Okayama, Okayama Prefecture, Japan
- Okayama Seagulls, a women's volleyball team based in Okayama, Okayama Prefecture, Japan

== Transportation ==
- Okayama Airport, an airport in Okayama Prefecture, Japan
- Okayama Freight Terminal, a JR Freight rail station
- Okayama Station, a JR West railway station located in Okayama, Okayama Prefecture, Japan
- Ōokayama Station, a railway station on the Ōimachi and Meguro Lines in Ōta, Tokyo, Japan

== Other ==
- 2084 Okayama, a Main-belt Asteroid discovered in 1935 by S. Arend
- Okayama (dance), a Japanese Muromachi-period kōwakamai
- Okayama at-large district, a constituency

== See also ==
- Oka (disambiguation)
- Yama (disambiguation)
