= Hopak-Kolom =

Ukrainian folk dance

Hopak-Kolom (Ukrainian: Гопак-Koлoм) is a popular folk dance from Ukraine. It is similar to the hopak, although it is performed in a circle. Although not as popular today as it was in the 20th century, it is still performed by amateurs, professional Ukrainian dance ensembles, and other performers of folk dances.

The dance itself reflects the full breadth of the Ukrainian soul, and has long been a hallmark of Ukrainian culture. Hopak depicts a kind of dialogue in which men show their character, strength and courage, and girls - their elegance and beauty.

== History ==
The history of the origin of hopak is connected with the combat training trains of the Zaporizhzy Sich cossacks in the 16-18th centuries.

Therefore, at first it was an exclusively male dance. Hetmans, taking a mace, began to dance in the center of the circle, and entering the circle of Cossacks confirmed their supremacy. The name hopak comes from the word "Gopal" - to jump, and from a similar exclamation "hop".

The new history of hopak began with the creation in 1940 of the song and dance ensemble of Ukraine, which was headed from 1955 to 1975 by Pavlo Pavlovich Virsky. It was this choreographer who created an academic folk dance based on classics and traditional folklore, and staged the famous hopak, which still completes the concerts of the academic dance ensemble of Ukraine named after him.

Hopak is a battle dance. Every movement of which is a combat kick from different positions, even sitting. The Byzantine historian of the ninth century Leo the Deacon in the "Chronicles", describing the campaigns of Prince Svyatoslav, called the Magi children of Satan, who learned the art of war through dance. The oldest image of hopak - ancient figurines from the Kyiv region of the 6th century – the so-called Martin's treasure.
