= Kalikapatadi =

Kalikapatadi is a folk dance performed in West Bengal, India. It is commonly associated with the Howrah district, and is based on stories of the Hindu deities Shiva and Kali. The dance traditionally depicts Kali's destruction of evil, and the subsequent attempts by Shiva to control her anger.

It is traditionally performed in the Gajan festival on Nilaratri, the final day of the year in the Bengali calendar.
