= Ewoya Dance =

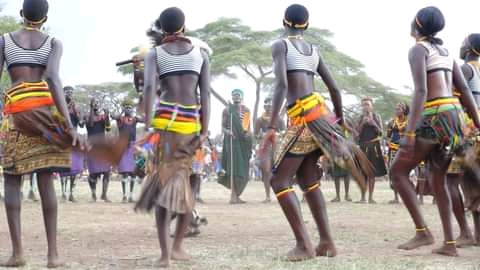
Ewoya dance of The jie People.

Ewoya Dance is a traditional Folk Dance of the Jie people found in North-Eastern Uganda in the Karamoja Sub-region Kotido District. It involves continuous vertical high jumping. This dance is significantly used to search for partners where both women and men jump and whoever jumps highest gets the most handsome or beautiful partner. Ewoya Dance of the Jie people are similar to that of the Maasai, and Karamojong. The Jie speak a language dialect of the Karamojong people.

== See also ==
- Ugandan Folklore
- Ugandan Traditions
- Gisu People
- Samia Tribe
