= Fanga (dance) =

West African dance originating in Liberia or Sierra Leone

Fanga is a dance "interpretation of a traditional Liberian invocation to the earth and sky". The dance originated in Liberia or Sierra Leone. The first performance of a version of Fanga in the United States may have been by Asadata Dafora in 1943; Marcia Ethel Heard believes that Pearl Primus hid Dafora's influence on her work. The dance was written by Primus in 1959 in conjunction with the National Dance Company of Liberia. Fanga was one of the dances through which Primus sought to stylize and perpetuate African dance traditions by framing dance as a symbolic act, an everyday practice, and a ceremony. It was then further popularized by Primus' students, sisters Merle Afida Derby and Joan Akwasiba Derby. Babatunde Olatunji described Fanga as a dance of welcome from Liberia and he, and many others, used a song created by LaRocque Bey to go with the rhythm and dance, assisted by some of the students in his Harlem studio, during the early 1960s. Bey used words from the Yoruba and Vai languages (alafia = welcome; ashe = so be it; fanga = drum) and an African American folk melody popularized by American minstrels (Li'l Liza Jane).
