= Gangshan =

Gangshan may refer to:

- Gangshan District, Kaohsiung, Taiwan
- Gangshan station, Kaohsiung, Taiwan
- Gangshan Subdistrict (钢山街道), Zoucheng, Jining, Shandong Province, China
- Jing Gangshan (景岗山), a character in Chinese film Phantom of the Theatre
