= Tropanka =

Tropanka (Bulgarian: Тропанка) is a folk dance from the region of Dobrudzha in northeastern Bulgaria. It's known for its heavy earthy styling, pumping arm motions and foot stamps.

It is a line dance, done with the dancers in a line or arc, holding hands, facing in, to 2/4 meter music. It was originally a men's dance, but is now often done in mixed lines. As with other Balkan folk dances there are many different variations originating in different villages. It is also performed outside Bulgaria in international folk dance groups and children's physical education classes.

== See also ==
- Bulgarian dances
- Podaraki
