= Bachatango =

Type of dance

Bachatango is a style of dance that fuses the four-step Dominican bachata with Argentine tango moves, including elaborated kicks, dips, turns, ganchos, leg wraps and long pauses. The dance is characterized by sensual hip and body movements. Partners hold each other in a closed position where the female's inside right thigh is in contact with the inside of the male's right thigh, while using the hand placements of typical Latin style dances.
