= Mwanzele =

Mwanzele is a dance style originally performed during funerals by the Mijikenda tribe of the Coast Province of Kenya.

Popular artists have recorded a number of popular songs using this style of music, the most famous being the late Bini Ya Mama together with his wife. He hailed from Bate village in Dagamra. Bin Hare is another popular Mwanzele performer; he and Nyerere wa Konde both hail from the Malindi region of the coastal province and Kilifi County.
