= Tello (dance) =

Azerbaijani national dance

Tello (Azerbaijani: Tello) is an Azerbaijani national dance. It is a kind of yalli dance and is related to a female name.

== Performance of the dance ==
Both women and men can perform this dance. The dancers hold the little fingers of each other and lift them at shoulders level. The dancing process consists of two fast parts, during which the shoulders move up and down. This dance is popular almost in all regions of Azerbaijan.
