= Van papuri =

Song
- Genre: Halay circle dance

Van papuri (Papouri)(Փափուռի) is a folk dance from the village of Khorkom (Dilkaya), Edremit, Van. It is a form of circle dance, and is a type of Halay.

== See also ==
External videos
- Grup Gündoğarken; ANKARA'DAN ABİM GELDİ
- Folk Dance; Papouri

- Ankara'dan Abim Geldi
- Kalamatianos
- Tsamiko
- Sirtaki
- Omal
- Horon
- Khigga
- An Dro
- Tamzara
- Hora
- Dabke
