= Kaline =

Kaline is a given name and a surname. Notable people with the name include:

- Kaline Medeiros (born 1979), Brazilian mixed martial artist
- Al Kaline (1934–2020), American major league baseball player
- Colin Kaline (born 1989), American baseball coach and former minor league player
