= Youz bir =

Youz bir is an Azerbaijani dance. It is performed inclined to musical composition. Its speed can be described as a little fast and it is performed with different movements. Both men and women can perform it. It was popular in the past but at present it is rarely performed.
