= José María Oliveira =

Spanish film director (1934–2025)

José María Oliveira Aldamiz (1934 – 5 September 2025) was a Spanish film director. He was also one of the earliest Spaniards to join the Church of Jesus Christ of Latter-day Saints (LDS Church) and the first stake president of the Madrid Spain Stake.

== Career ==
Oliveira worked as a local director for the William Morris Agency. He was in charge of managing the distribution of the Spanish film "Lawrence of Arabia."

Oliveira's two most prominent works are the horror films Las flores del miedo (1973) and Los muertos, la carne y el diablo (1974). He wrote, directed, and produced the films. Patricia Wright, his wife, starred in both of the films. Las flores del miedo and Los muertos, la carne y el diablo grossed almost 10 million pesetas together.

== Personal life and death ==
Oliveira married Patricia Wright, an American actress.

Wright was a member of the LDS Church and introduced Oliveira to it. He was one of the first Spanish nationals to be baptized into the LDS Church when he was baptized in 1966 in France. In 1982 when the Madrid Spain Stake was organized, Oliveira was called as its first president.

Oliveira died on 5 September 2025, at the age of 91.
