= Wolosso =

Wolosso is a type of erotic dance from Côte d'Ivoire. The moves involved, described as involving "buttock-swinging," have caused controversy among Muslims in Guinea. Several allegations of rape have been made by young women in Conakry against men who accused them of doing the Wolosso dance.
