= Tropotianka =

Folk dance

Tropotianka (Ukrainian: Tропoтянкa) is a folk dance from southwestern Ukraine. It is performed by amateurs, professional Ukrainian dance ensembles as well as other performers of folk dances. It has a common origin or is derived from the Romanian dance "Tropotita" (Rom. a tropai, a tropoti — to beat the rhythm with the feet).
