= Bardo Chham =

Bardo Chham is a folk dance traditional to the Himalayan Buddhist Tribes of Arunachal Pradesh, India. Bardo means the limbo between death and rebirth in Tibetan Buddhism, as under the Tibetan Book of Dead. While Chham, literally translates to "Dance" in Tibetan. Bardo Chham is based on the stories of the triumph of good over evil. According to the local beliefs, both good and evil exists within mankind. The dance is portrayed with the use of traditional wooden masks, representing different animals and characters.
