= Gulewamkulu =

Traditional dance of Malawi

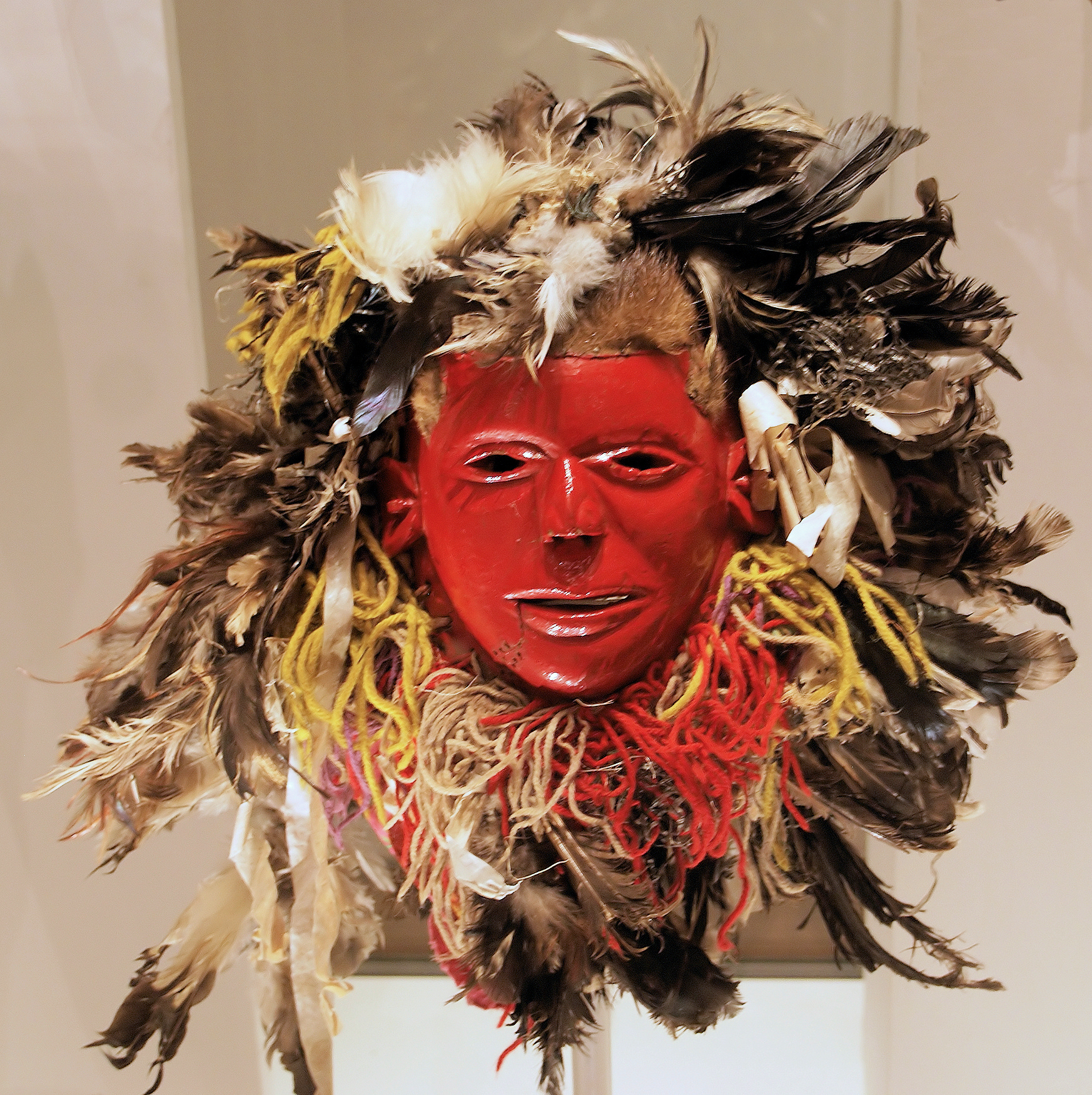
- Gulewamkulu dancing mask worn by Nyaus from Malawi and Zambia
- Etymology: Healing dance
- Genre: Traditional
- Instruments: Clapping; Drums; Bongos; Shakers; Congas; Agogô; Triangles
- Inventor: The Chewa people (ethnic group)
- Year: 1700
- Origin: Malawi, Zambia

Gule Wamkulu (also spelled Gulewamkulu) is a ritual masquerade and dance tradition of the Chewa people in Malawi, Zambia, and Mozambique. It is performed by initiated members of the Nyau society. The name is widely translated as "the great dance".

The practice is associated with the Chewa-speaking populations of Central and Southern Africa and has been documented as part of ritual and social events, including funerals, ceremonies, and communal gatherings.

== History ==
The ritual of Gulewamkulu traces back to the 17th century during the period of the Maravi state, a pre-colonial cultural and political formation among the Chewa group.

During the colonial period, missionary authorities attempted to suppress Nyau practices, including Gule Wamkulu. Despite the supression, the ritual continued, and in some cases, Gule Wamkulu added in merged elements of Christianity while maintaining its role within Chewa Society.

== Symbolism ==
The ritual involves masked dancers wearing full body costumes made from materials such as wood, straw, and cloth. The masks symbolize various figures including animals, characters, objects, and ancestral spirits. Each masked character is represents various songs, rhythms, and movements. These elements convey social norms, moral instructions, and commentary.

== Cultural and ritual functions ==
Gule Wamkulu is a ceremonial ritual in Chewa communal life. It is performed during funerals, installation of chiefs or during deaths, and other occasions. Ethnographic accounts describe the performance as mediating relationships between the living and the ancestral realm while reinforcing social values and community structures.

== Context Today ==
Up until recently, the ritual of Gule Wamkulu is also practiced during non-ritual ceremonies, including festivals, tourism, and public events. Some studies note that performances outside traditional settings may alter the meaning or function of the practice. Several efforts to document and safeguard the practice have been undertaken at both national and international levels.
