= Körtánc =

Csango körtánc

Körtánc is a style of Hungarian folk dance which originated in Nyitra County, now in Slovakia. It is a circle dance in 4/4 time.
