= Yurukikos =

Yurukikos or Yurukiko (Greek: Γιουρούκικος) is a Greek instrumental dance from Agiasos, Lesbos, Greece, with a nine beat rhythm. The dance has many similarities with antikristos dance. The tune take its name from the Yörüks, the Turkish nomadic tribe.

The dance can be also compared with Greek rebetiko dances of that time.

== See also ==
- Antikristos
- Greek dances
- Music of Greece
- Rebetiko
