= Pravo =

Pravo horo (Bulgarian: Право хоро, lit. 'straight dance') is a simple folk dance from Bulgaria that is done throughout the Balkan countries. In Greece, it is called Zonaradiko. It is considered the "national dance" of Bulgaria, Albania, and North Macedonia. It is a rustic village line dance with a three-measure pattern, done to 2/4 or 6/8 music, and is a staple of weddings, feast days, and other celebrations. As with other Balkan dances, each country and even local region has its own variation of the dance, often interspersing other steps with the basic pravo step, to the extent that these different versions amount to distinct dances.

== Description ==
Pravo is a line dance, with men and women dancers in one or more concentric curving lines, facing in toward the center, holding hands. One of two handholds is used, either simply holding hands down at the sides with right palm facing forward, left facing back, or the "belt hold" (na lesa), with each dancer holding the front of his two neighboring dancers' belt or sash, left arm over right. In most forms, the line moves slowly toward the right, so the rightmost dancer is the leader. The curving line of dancers moves in toward the center then out again, in the basic step, as the line moves to the right. This pattern is repeated throughout the dance. There are several variations of the basic step, all have the form step, step, step, pause, step, pause, where the pause may be replaced with variations detailed below. One common step is

Measure 1: (beat 1) Facing forward, step R foot forward and slightly diagonally R, (beat 2) step L foot next to R;
Measure 2: (beat 1) Step R foot forward and slightly diagonally R, (beat 2) pause;
Measure 3: (beat 1) Step L foot forward and slightly diagonally to R, (beat 2) turn slightly L to face center;
Measure 4: (beat 1) step R foot straight back, (beat 2) step L foot next to R;
Measure 5: (beat 1) step R foot straight back, (beat 2) pause;
Measure 6: (beat 1) step L foot back and slightly to L, (beat 2) pause;

The styling is rather heavy and earthy, with the knees always slightly bent and flexing slightly with each step. The first two steps forward with the R foot are done with a peculiar sliding motion. The leader and tail dancer may hold up handkerchiefs with their free hands and twirl them.

The dance lasts as long as the musicians wish to keep playing, and in villages may go on for hours. The in and out motion becomes hypnotic after 20 to 30 minutes.

=== Variations ===
Each dancer may individually add certain variations or ornamentations to the basic step at will:

1. Stamp: A small stamp may be added by the same foot just before the steps taken forward in beats 1 and 2 of measure 1
2. Chug: As the step forward is made in measure three, share the weight on both feet and scoot both heels forward, keeping feet apart.
3. Triplets: The steps forward may be replaced by three light steps, the last two in place, in measure 2 (R-L-R), and measure 3 (L-R-L). Similarly, the steps back may be replaced by three light steps in measure 5 (R-L-R) and measure 6 (L-R-L).
4. Tropoli: In place of the triplets, the dancer may step on full foot (count 1), tap other toe, raising supporting heel off floor (count &), sharply bring supporting heel down to floor (count 2), and tap other heel next to supporting foot (count &).

== Rhythm ==
The time signature is 2/4 or 6/8 – counted as 2 triplets 3+3. Often in music for the pravo, both 2/4 and 6/8 time signatures will be used where 2/4 is used for the singing and 6/8 is used for the slightly faster instrumental portions. In Bulgaria, the 6/8 portion is also transcribed in 2/4 using triplets. Each dance phrase corresponds to 3 musical measures counted as quick, quick, slow, slow, (corresponding to 2+2+4+4 in 2/4 time or 1+1+2+2 in 6/8 time).

== See also ==
- Bulgarian dances
- List of folk dances sorted by origin
- Zonaradiko
