= Gambols =

Social dance set to 18th-century English folk tune

Classification
- Genre: English country dance
- Formation: Four couples longways
- Difficulty: challenging
- Tempo: brisk
- Character: lively
- Key: A major

Choreography
- Choreographer: Jenna Simpson
- Year: 2011/2014
- Published in: Under the Influence

Music
- Title: The Shepherd and Shepherdess
- Year: 1799
- Published in: Thompson's twenty-four country dances for the year 1799

Gambols is an English country dance created by Jenna Simpson for four couples.

== Tune ==
The dance is set to a tune published as "The Shepherd and Shepherdess" in a 1799 collection by Thompson, a publisher based in St Paul's Churchyard. An earlier collection published by John Johnson, a publisher located on Cheapside and facing Bow Church, includes the same tune under the same name.

== Dance ==
Jenna Simpson originally devised the dance in 2011, revised it in 2014, and published it in a collection of dances titled Under the Influence in 2017. The dance is composed for four couples longways.
