= Povrateno =

Povrateno (Macedonian: Повратено; English: Recovered) is a traditional Macedonian Oro, folk dance, from the region of Skopje.

It is a women's dance with medium fast movements on a whole feet. The dancers are holding their belts with left hand over the right one and begin their dance in a position of a half circle. The dance rhythm is 2/4.

== See also ==
- Music of North Macedonia
