= Crpi voda, Jano =

- Genre: Folk dance
- Time signature: 2/4
- Origin: Skopje, North Macedonia

Crpi voda, Jano (Macedonian: Црпи вода, Јано; English: Draw water, Jana) is a traditional Macedonian oro folk dance and song from the region of Skopje.

It is a mixed dance performed by a man and a woman with steady simple movements on half feet. The dancers hold their belts and begin their dance in a position of a half circle. The dance rhythm is 2/4.

The dance is associated with the song:

In Macedonian:

Црпи вода, Јано, бегај дома,
Оздол иде, Јано, силен аскер,
Оздол иде, Јано, силен аскер,
Силен аскер, Јано, Демир-Тоска,
Напред врви, Јано, Мамуд паша,
А по него, Јано, гаваз-Шукри,
Ќе ти сакат, Јано, ладна вода,
А по вода, Јано, бело лице.

Translation in English:

Draw water, Jana, run home,
From above comes a strong army, Jana,
From above comes a strong army, Jana,
A strong army, Jana, Demir-Toska,
At its head, Jana, comes Mahmud Pasha,
And next to him, Jana, is Gavaz-Shukri
They will want cold water, Jana,
They will want your white face, Jana.

== See also ==
- Music of North Macedonia
