= Trizalis =

Trizalis (Greek: τριζάλης), is a Greek folk dance from Crete, Greece, similar to Pidikhtos and is very widespread in the Greek islands. It is also called "Κουρουθιανός" (Kourouthianos).

== See also ==
- Music of Greece
- Greek dances
