= Zarambeque =

The zarambeque is a dance and musical form of the 17th and early 18th centuries with roots in Spanish colonial America, where Spanish, African and mestizo influences converged. It was considered a very lively, boisterous dance. Performed by popular and academic musicians, the zarambeque is written in triple and sextuple meter, with parallel or serial second lines in duple or quadruple meter. Diego Fernández de Huete and Santiago de Murcia made sketches of the genre.
