= Šopka =

The Šopka (Шопка) is a Macedonian oro from the region of Kratovo.

It is a vivid women's dance with quick and small steps and small jumps. The dancers are holding belts and begin their dance in the position of a half circle. The dance rhythm is 2/4.

== See also ==
- Music of North Macedonia
