= Vlečenoto =

Vlečenoto (Macedonian: Влеченото; translated in English as the dragged [oro]) is a traditional Macedonian Oro, a folk dance from the region of Skopje.

Vlečenoto is a female dance with medium-fast movements involving dragging the feet along the ground. Jumps also occur during the dance. The dance begins in a semicircle, and the dance rhythm is 2/4.

== See also ==
- Music of North Macedonia
