= Starotikveško =

Starotikveško (Macedonian: Старотиквешко; English: The old Tikveš dance) is a traditional Macedonian Oro, folk dance, from region of Tikveš, region in the central part of North Macedonia.

It is characterized by fast and complex footwork, accompanied by lively music played on traditional instruments. It is a man dance with five parts of dance going from slow to fast dancing. The dancers are first holding shoulders then dance with loose hands. They begin their dance in a position of a half circle and later they dance in circle one in front of the other. The dance rhythm is 2/4.

== See also ==
- Music of North Macedonia
