= Gluvo-nemo =

- Genre: Folk dance
- Time signature: 2/4
- Origin: North Macedonia

Gluvo-nemo (Глуво-немо) or Deaf-mute dance in English is a Macedonian oro from the region of Small Reka and Galičnik, region along the river of Radika.

It is a woman dance that is danced without music, only by the rhythm of the coins on the chests on the woman costumes. The dancers are holding belts with the left over the right arm and begin their dance in a position of a half circle. The dance rhythm is 2/4.

== See also ==
- Music of North Macedonia
