= Potrčulka =

Potrčulka (Macedonian: Потрчулка; English: Hurrying dance) is a traditional Macedonian oro, folk dance, from the town of Kočani.

It is a woman dance with medium fast movements, small steps and small jumps on half feet. The dancers are holding their belts with left hand over the right one and begin their dance in a position of a half circle. The dance rhythm is 2/4.

== See also ==
- Music of North Macedonia
