= Podaraki =

External videos
- Μαρί Φίντω(Turkish)
- ΜΑΘΗΜΑΤΑ ΧΟΡΩΝ ΘΡΑΚΗΣ / ΠΟΔΑΡΑΚΙ

Podaraki (Pontic Greek: Ποδαράκι) is a Greek dance from the Pontos region. The dance dates to the 10th century. It is now danced in modern-day Turkey as well as the northern Thrace.

The dance is called Podaraki (meaning "small foot" in Greek) because it involves much stomping with the Podia (feet) of the dancer. It is danced both by men and women usually in an open circle, and rarely in straight line. It's a female song, also called μπάτε "κορίτσια στο χορό" (mpate koritsia sto horo), meaning "go girls to the dance." In the song, a supposed girl calls the other girls to go dancing and to have fun before marrying. In its second half, after expressing the traditional criticism against both her husband and her mother and father-in-law for not letting her go dance and have fun, the supposed girl explains how she avenges both them and her children for that.

== See also ==
- Greek folk music
- Greek dances
- Tropanka
