= Okeme =

Ugandan folk dance

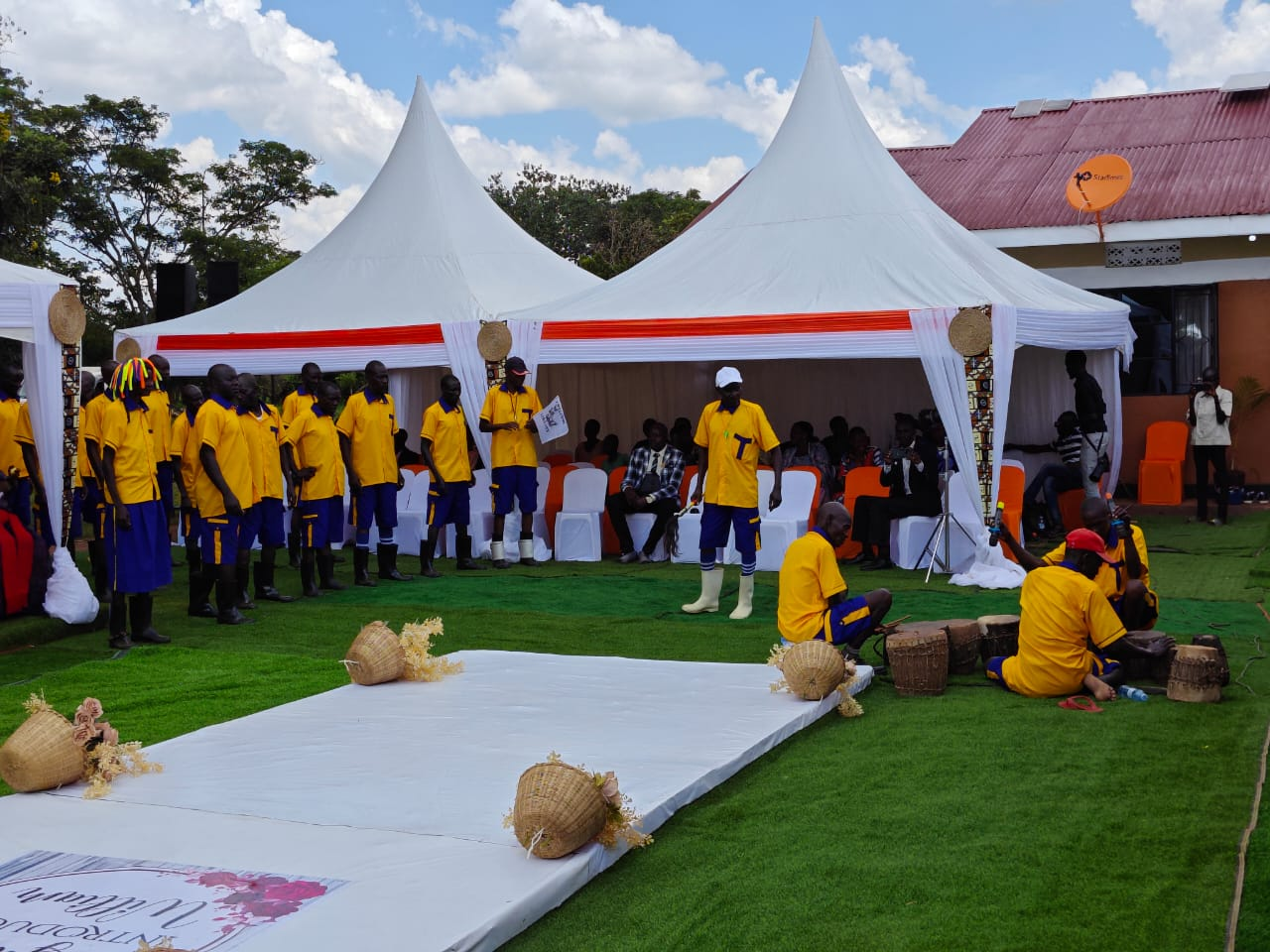
Abuda and Okeme Dancers on Stage

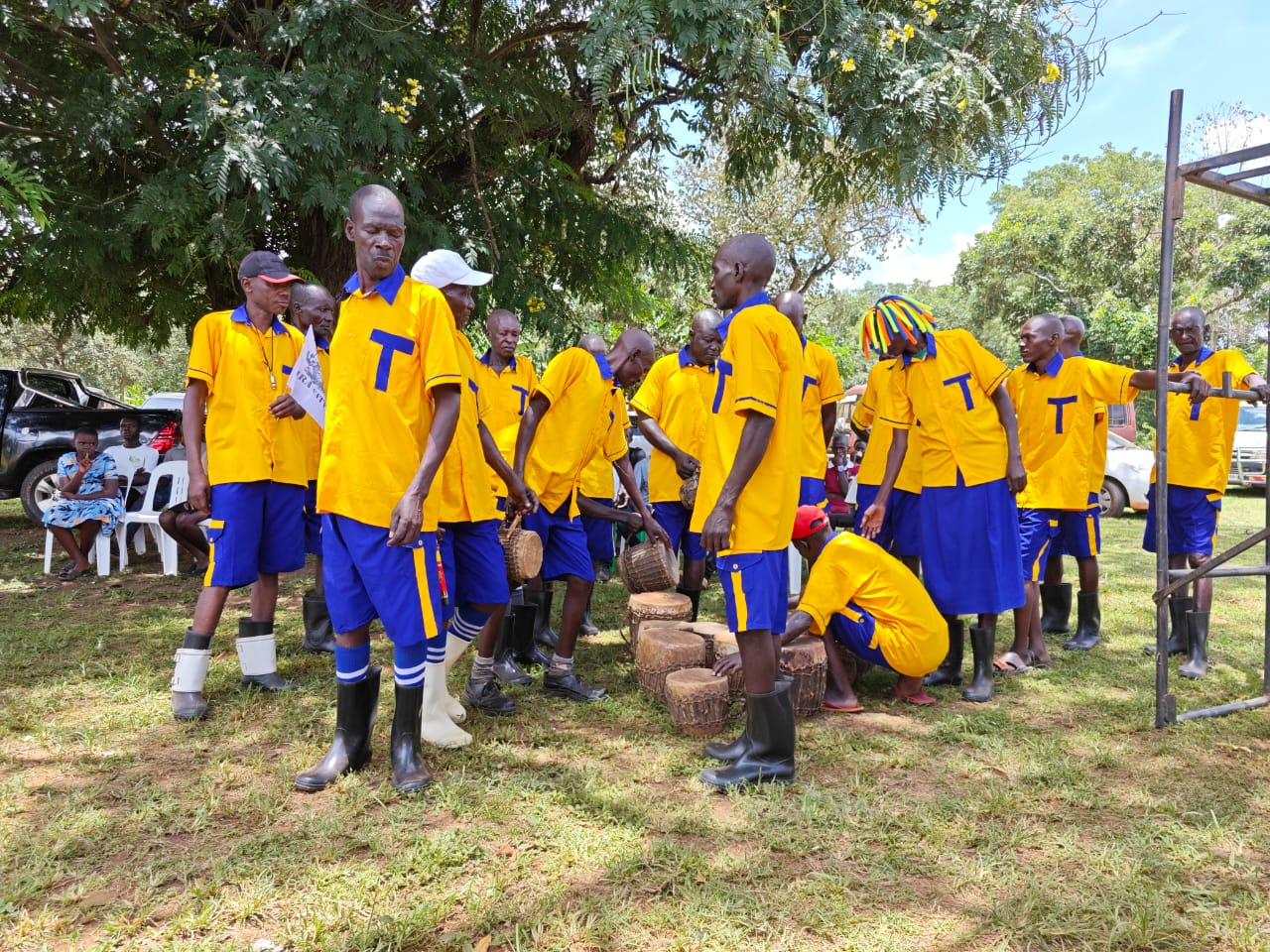
Lango Abuda dancers performing Okeme

Okeme is a traditional Lango folk dance. It is often performed at weddings, cultural introduction ceremonies, and graduation ceremonies.

== Cultural significance ==
Okeme holds important cultural value among the Lango as a participatory art form that reinforces community bonds and shared identity. The performance often brings dancers and spectators together, inviting widespread participation and social interaction. Lango cultural heritage institutions recognize Okeme as part of the region's traditional expressive practices.

It is also featured alongside other cultural practices at weddings and social celebrations, where dance and music serve both entertainment and communal expression functions.

== Performance ==
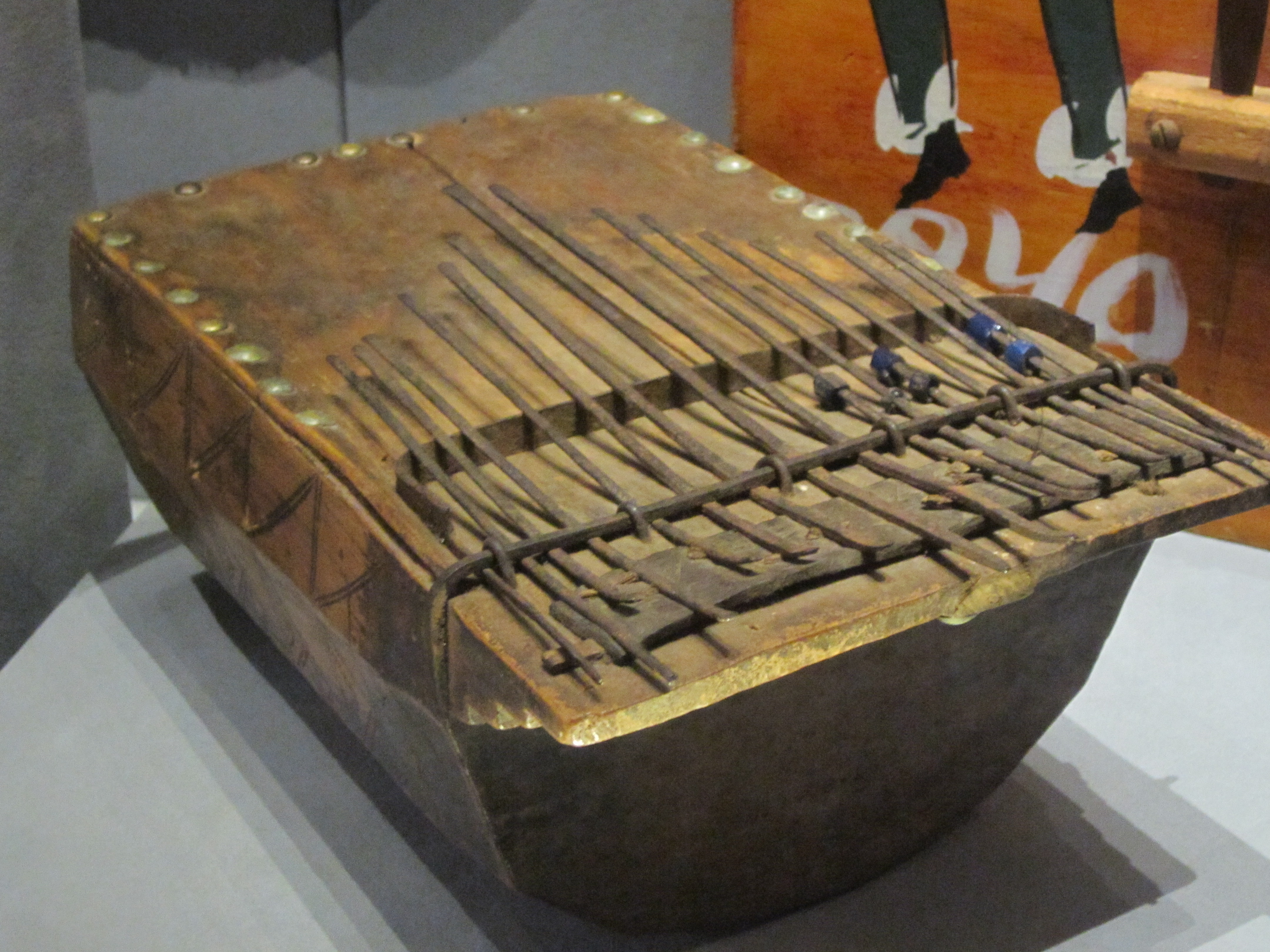
Okeme (Thump Piano)

Okeme is a highly interactive dance where the dancers jump while stamping their feet on the ground. They use great force while jumping, dancing to the tunes of the drum while they sing to the audience.

Performing this dance gives opportunity for all people attending the particular event to join the traditional dance and have fun.

Traditionally, participants include both experienced performers and members of the audience, making Okeme a widely accessible and inclusive cultural activity.

== Music and instruments ==
Okeme music is centered around okeme instrument, a type of lamellophone or thumb piano common in the Lango sub-region. The instruments produces melodic percussion through plucked metal keys mounted on a resonating wooden body. In performance settings, the thumb piano is typically supported by vocal singing and drums to create a dynamic rhythmic ensemble.

== Origin and history ==
The tradition of Okem is believed to have developed among the Lango people, whose ancestral homelands include present -day districts such as Otuke and Alebtong in northern Uganda.

== Modern practice ==
In contemporary Uganda, Okeme continues to be performed at cultural festivals, community events, and educational settings where local traditions are shared and celebrated. Cultural organizations and local performance troupes often promote Okeme to preserve Lango heritage and introduce it to wider audiences.

Notable Lango musicians associated with Okeme music have also contributed to its popularity and documentation. For example, the late Morris Sirikinti Ekuka Adongo was widely recognized for performing and composing music using the okeme thumb piano, drawing attention to Lango folk traditions.

== See also ==
- Baganda
- Ugandan folklore
- Ugandan traditions
- Gisu people
- Lango people
- Culture of Uganda
