= Picking Up Sticks =

Classification
- Genre: English Country Dance
- Formation: Longways for six
- Difficulty: easy
- Tempo: brisk
- Character: lively
- Key: D minor
- Era: Playford

Choreography
- Choreographer: John Playford
- Year: 1651
- Published in: The Dancing Master, 1st edition

Music
- Title: Lavena
- Collector: Cecil Sharp
- Year: 1909
- Published in: Country Dance Tunes

Picking Up Sticks is an English country dance for three couples in a line, recorded by John Playford in 1651.

== Tune ==
This is NOT the tune for Picking Up Sticks. This tune is called Lavena (also from 1651) and Cecil Sharp substituted the tune at the beginning of the 20th century.

== Steps ==
reconstructed by Greg Lindahl

Bar	Steps
1 – 8	Forward and back a double, and again.
1 – 2	First man changes with second woman, passing right shoulders and going back to back,
3 – 4	first man changes with third man,
5 – 8	Take hands with person across from you, all forward and back a double.
1 – 4	First woman changes with second man, and then third woman,
5 – 8	Forward and back a double.
1 – 16	Repeat changes and forward/back from new positions; note that throughout this sequence, half of the time you will be dancing with someone of the same gender.
1 – 16	Repeat changes a third time from new positions, ending up where you started the dance
1 – 8	Siding.
1 – 4	Couple 3 crosses and skips once around the entire set, while Couple 1 sashays down to 2nd position, while Couple 2 steps back and up to 1st position, then
5 – 8	Couple 2 sashays back to place, while Couple 1 steps back and up to place.
1 – 8	Repeat with Couple 1 going 'around the world' and couples 2 and 3 changing places, starting with Couple 2 sashaying down.
1 – 8	Arming.
1 – 24	Men sheepskin hey.
1 – 24	Women sheepskin hey.

== External sources ==
- Picking up Sticks on The Traditional Tune Archive
