= Robam Meh Ambao =

Robam Meh Ambao (Khmer: របាំមេអំបៅ, Butterfly Dance) is a Khmer dance in the form of a play that is commonly performed by children in the schools of Cambodia.

It illustrates a story of bug hunters working diligently to maintain the garden and keeping unwanted bugs away. At the same time, a group of young female butterflies flying and singing in the garden as they look for pollen to extract. To their surprise, the butterflies are quietly caught by the bug hunters. They try to convince the hunters to release them by claiming they were just "beautifying" the garden.
