= Namgen =

Namgen dance is performed in Himachal Pradesh.

The Namagen dance is performed in the month of September to celebrate the autumn. They wear costumes which are largely woolen and studded with silver ornaments. They are worn by women.

Mostly men and women dance together. They are close to each other in this.
