= Trojak (dance) =

Silesian folk dance

Trojak ("threesome", "trio", in Polish) is a Silesian folk dance. It is usually performed in groups of three: one male dancer and two female dancers. Trojak's music has two distinct parts, each having its own tempo and metre.

Ignoring the footwork, the figures may have the following arrangements.

- All three move in sync from the same foot.
- The boy dances with one girl, the second one dancing alone, then the boy switches the girl.
- Girls are rolling on and then rolling off the arms.
- The trio forms a circle
- The boy and the girls separate and move in the opposite directions, then join again.
