= Moraego =

The outer circle in a moraego dance in 1918, Kulawi, Sulawesi. Photo by Walter Kaudern.

Moraego (or raego, or marego), is the name of a traditional and ritual dance in Central Sulawesi.

In historical time, Central Sulawesi highlanders have performed circle dances and accompanying songs (in Uma raego) at all major precolonial rituals. The Moraego dances and songs were performed to summon and communicate with their pre-Christian deities. They were ritual procedures, among other things, to augment the agriculture and human fertility of highland families. In the course of time many dances have become profane dances.

The first European missionaries and scholars working in the area debated among themselves by the end of the 19th century and beginning of the 20th century if the dances and the songs held a religious component, or were mere secular entertainment. Missionaries, as well as Dutch authorities, sought to reduce the moraego performances for various reasons. For the authorities the problem was that the dances and rituals took time from doing "real work". In the dances there was close physical contact between men and women and this was something European missionaries objected to. Married women did not dance the ´raego, although they and their children were audience to these public events. But the wives participated in the choice and invitation of their husbands dance partners.

== Early reports ==
From the end of the 19th century there are several descriptions of the Moraego dances and rituals, especially from the Palu Toradja, the Koro Toradja, as well as the Poso Toradja. Similar dances are also known from the Mori District in East Central Sulawesi and from the so called Saadang Toradja in the south-western part of Central Sulawesi.

In 1897 Adriani and Kruyt witnessed a raego in Kulawi on their journey across Central Sulawesi. Captain Boonstra van Heerdt, a dutchman records the raego from Kulawi, Lindu and other places.

== Healing ==
Not all ´raego songs were oriented toward courtship activities. Rather, like other ritual speech forms in eastern Indonesia, the songs served more generally as performative elements of religious rituals and as hallowed words that had binding effects on human and deity relations. For example, some types included trance-like chanting that was meant to heal and cure sickness.

== Pubarty rites ==
While the children were confined to heal and fed only rice porridge after the puberty rites, adults celebrated just outside the temple singing and dancing moraego every night. One animal was sacrificed for every girl and for every three to five boys.
