= Hivinau =

Dance from Tahiti

The hivinau is a dance from Tahiti where the dancers turn in pairs around the orchestra. It is often either the first or the last dance of a dance festival or used as a transition between two dances.

Although an old dance, it is not traditional, the name hivinau probably derived from a yell by the officers of any passing European ship: "Heave now!", and the subsequent turning of the wheel with anchor chain by the crew.

The dance has two circles, one of men, another of women, turning around the centre axis where the orchestra sits, as whether the anchor is to be heaved. Every time a male and female dancer meet each other, they turn to each other, yell: "Hiri, haʻa, haʻa" and may perform some knee or hip shakes respectively.
