= The Strictly =

Type of dance

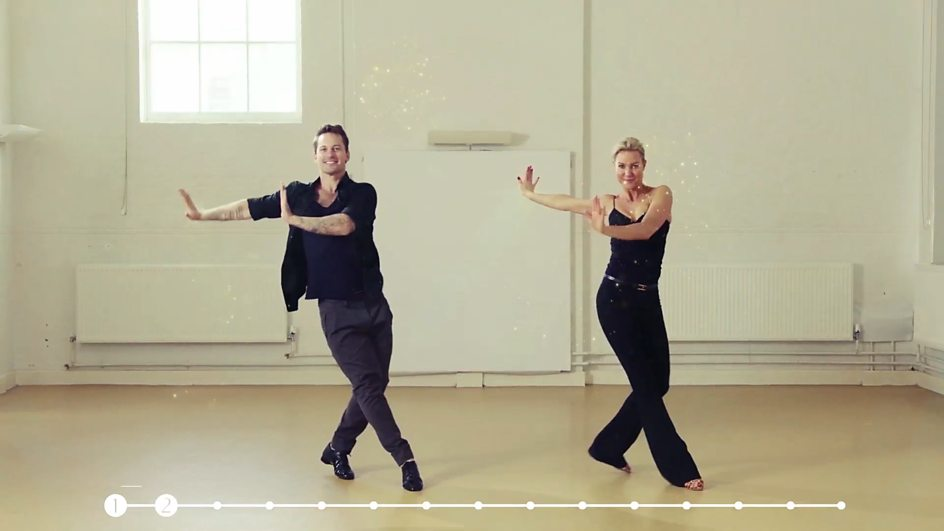
Natalie Lowe and Tristan MacManus perform The Strictly.

The Strictly is a signature dance routine from the BBC show Strictly Come Dancing, which launched in the 13th series of the popular entertainment show. The dance was devised by Strictly Come Dancing's Director of Choreography, Jason Gilkison and draws inspiration from some of the show's most iconic moves, as well as celebrating some of the show's stars.

== Background ==
A fragment of the dance first appeared in the professional's opening Strictly Express group number in the season premiere on 5 September 2015. It was referred to explicitly for the first time by Tess Daly on 3 October 2015 after the judges danced on performing some of the signature moves and discussed further the following week on the programme's sister show, Strictly Come Dancing: It Takes Two.

On 9 October 2015 a tutorial appeared on the BBC's website and iPlayer platform hosted by two of Strictly's professional dancers, Natalie Lowe and Tristan MacManus.

The dance is intended to be performed to the Strictly theme tune, and is made up of eight simple moves which repeat: the Samba Point, the Charleston, the Shimmy, the Lasso, the Samba Bounce, the Russell Grant, the Anton Flirt, Judy Murray, and the finale which can be either the Claudia (an embrace and a leg kick), the Tess (an embrace and a leg lift) or the Brucie (an embrace and a lean forward).

== How To Do The Strictly ==
1. Samba Point: Step across with your left foot and tap with your right. Stretch your left arm skyward. Repeat the step on your opposite leg.
2. The Charleston: Swing your left leg to the right and then back again. Swing your arms in the opposite direction to your left leg.
3. Samba Point: Step across with your left foot and tap with your right. Stretch your left arm skyward. Just think Saturday Night Fever. Repeat the step on your opposite leg.
4. Shimmy: Shimmy your shoulders and step around in a box step.
5. Lasso: Offer your right hand, partner to take hand before and bring them around your body in 6 steps.
6. Samba Bounce: Bounce in to meet hands and then out again.
7. Russell Grant: Face your lovely partner and roll those arms in front of your chest.
8. Anton Flirt: Wiggle your hips. If you're not the wriggler, turn in a circle. Repeat steps 1 - 5.
9. Judy Murray: Push in for two and out for two.
10. The Claudia: Finish with an embrace and leg kick, or; The Tess: Finish with an embrace and leg lift; or, The Brucie: Finish with an embrace and forward lean.

== Other instances ==
Various other BBC shows and stars have performed the routine. Notable examples include the cast of EastEnders, Casualty, Holby City, Teletubbies and Danger Mouse. On 19 October, British Airways published a video featuring their staff performing The Strictly at Heathrow Airport. On 28 November, a celebration film was published that highlights some key performances of the dance by TV stars and fans of the show.
