= Pembe =

Macedonian circle dance

Pembe oro
- Genre: Folk dance
- Time signature: 2/4
- Origin: Veles, North Macedonia

Pembe (Macedonian: Пембе) is a Macedonian circle dance (oro) from the region of Veles.

It is a mixed man and woman dance with steady movements on whole feet with a characteristic movement of the heels. The dance begins slow and speeds up toward the end. The dancers hold hands up, on a level with the shoulders. They begin their dance in a position of a half circle. The dance rhythm is 2/4.

== See also ==
- Music of North Macedonia
