= Chaiti ghoda =

Folk dance from Odisha, India

Chaiti Ghoda Nacha
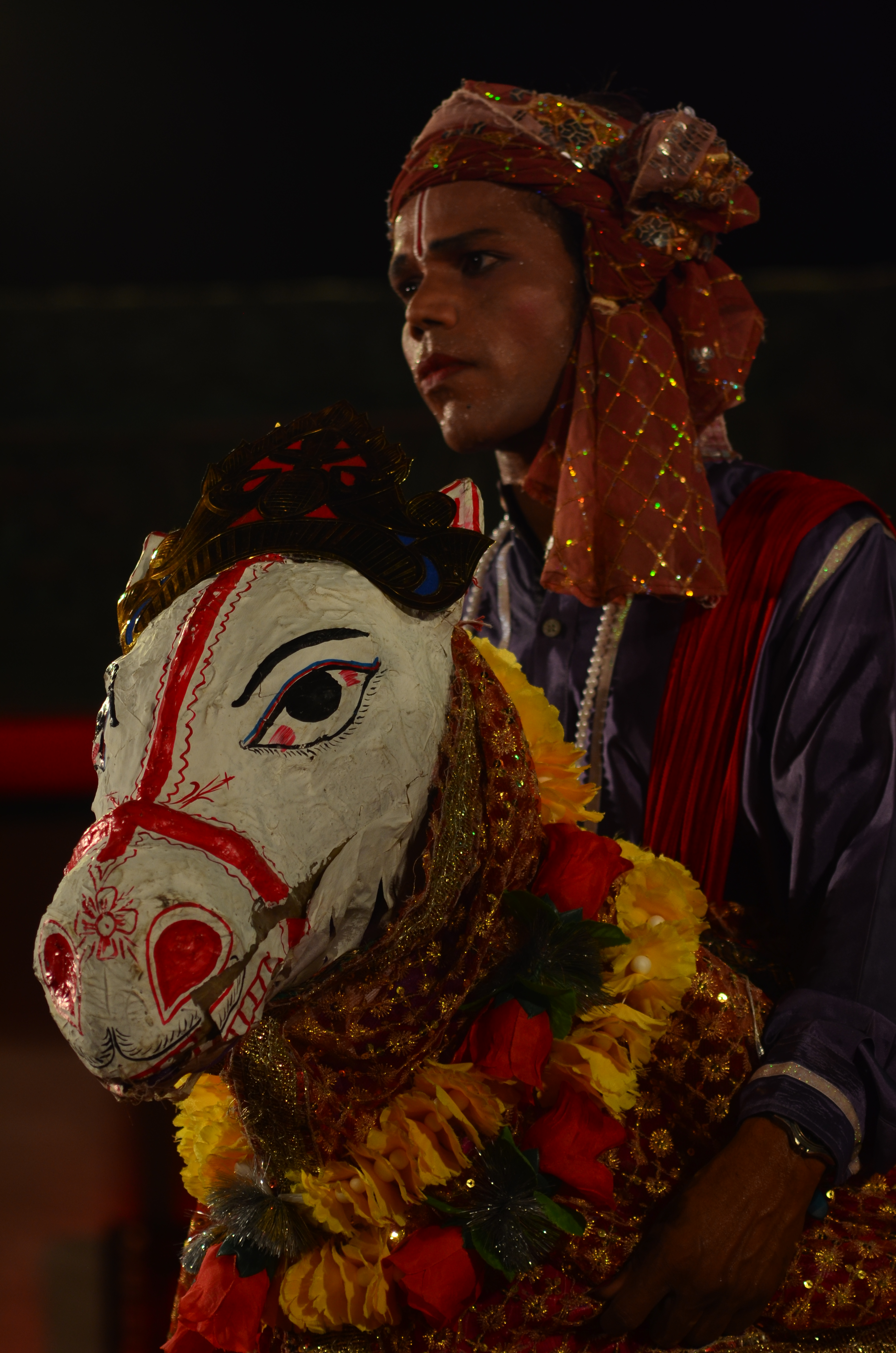
- Chaiti Ghoda dance performance
- Medium: music-drama
- Originating culture: Odia
- Originating era: Medieval period

Chaiti ghoda nacha is one of the popular folk dance forms of Odisha, India. The dance is performed by aboriginal fishermen tribes like the Keot (Kaibarta). Chaiti represent the chaitra month of the Hindu calendar year, that is, from March to April to the full moon in Baisakh, that is, from April to May; ghoda means horse in Odia and Hindi language.

== History ==
A story in the epic legend Ramayana says that when lord Rama crossed the Saraju river with the help of aboriginal Keot fishermen and in return, lord Rama had presented a horse to the fishermen.

The folk dance is connected with the worship of goddess Baseli. In the 15th century, Odia poet Achutananda Das had elaborated the details of the worship in the book, Kaibarta Gita. Also known as Baseli puja, the goddess from the Shakta tradition in Hinduism is worshipped by the fishermen community. Das mentions in the book that the puja originated in the 10th century.

The dance also played some role in India's freedom struggle movement. Scholars say that freedom fighters used the occasion to mobilise the fishermen community to fight against the British. There are some accounts saying that the fisherman community of Kujanga area used to use the dance to gain their freedom from the British administration.

In present times, the folk dance is not limited to the fishermen community solely; many other communities have begun to participate in it.

In 2020, Utsav Charan Das from the town of Choudwar in Odisha was awarded with the Padma Shri for his efforts spanning six decades in keeping the art of chaiti ghoda nacha alive. His efforts helped in the revival and renewed research interest in the folk art form and its adoption as a means to raise awareness about various social issues.

== Performance ==
The folk celebration takes place over a month, from Chaitra Purnima to Baisakha Purnima. The celebration begins on the day of Chaitra Purnima with the fishermen anointing the bamboo with candle paste, vermillion, and butter lamp, and splitting it into twelve pieces with which the frame of the dummy horse is built. The dummy horse frame is dyed with red clay and a wooden horse head is fixed to the frame, along with a garland of hibiscus flowers.

The frame is worshipped for eight days, and thereafter taken out for the ghoda nacha. Dancers dance with the rhythm of mahuri and dhola (drum) instruments. There are only two dancers: one male (known as Rauta) and the other is also a male in female attire (known as Rautani). They dance to the tune of folk songs. After the celebration concludes, the wooden horse head is removed from the horse frame and kept in the local temple to be brought out the next year.

The celebration draws a large crowd from the villages all around.

== Gallery ==
Ghoda Nacha or Chaiti Ghoda Nacha

Ghoda Nacha in Villages of Bhadrak

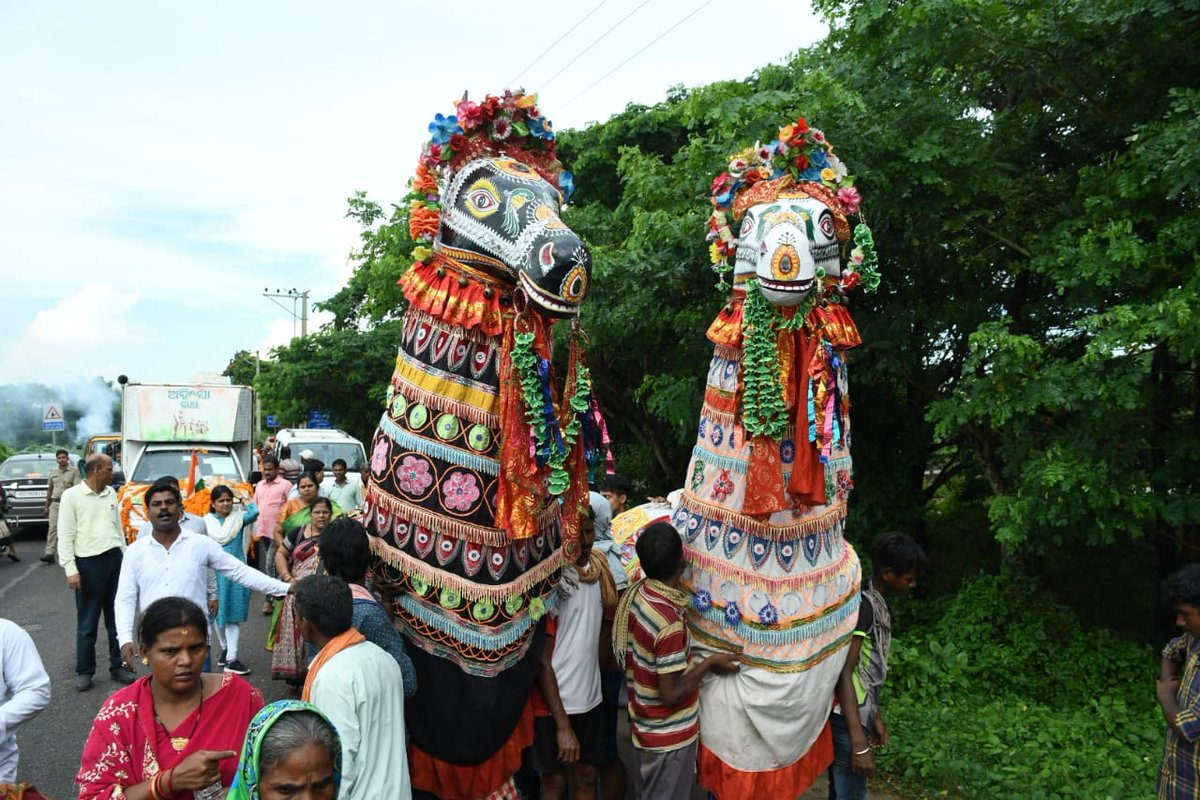

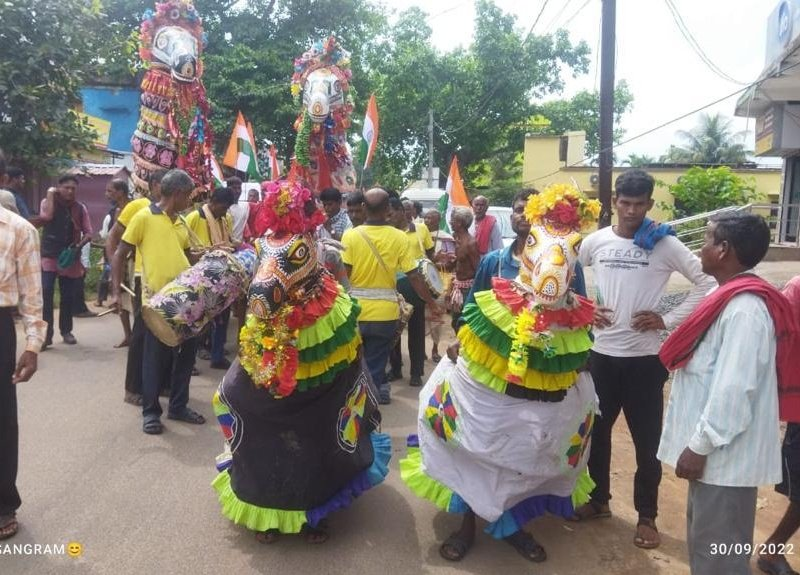

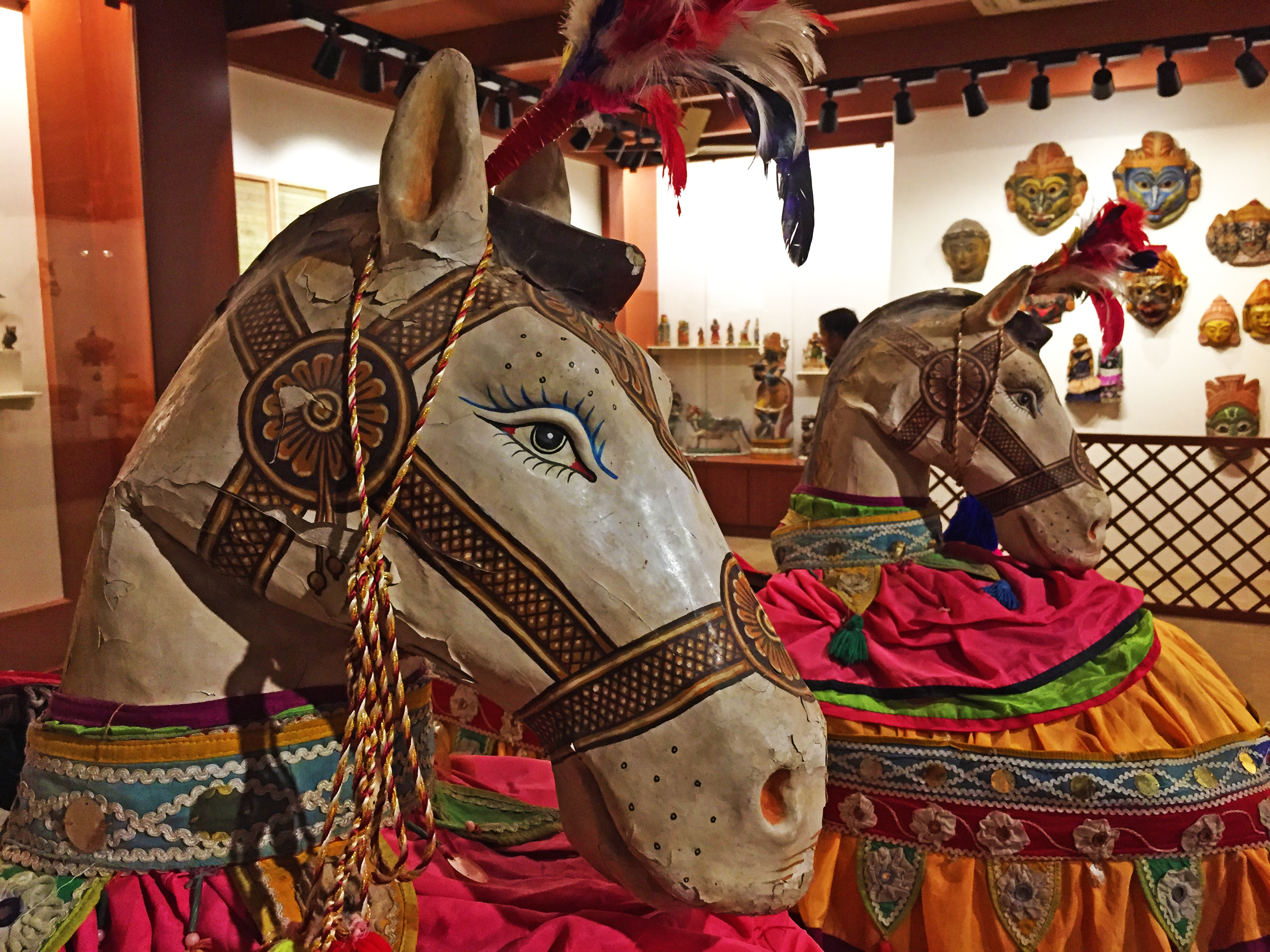

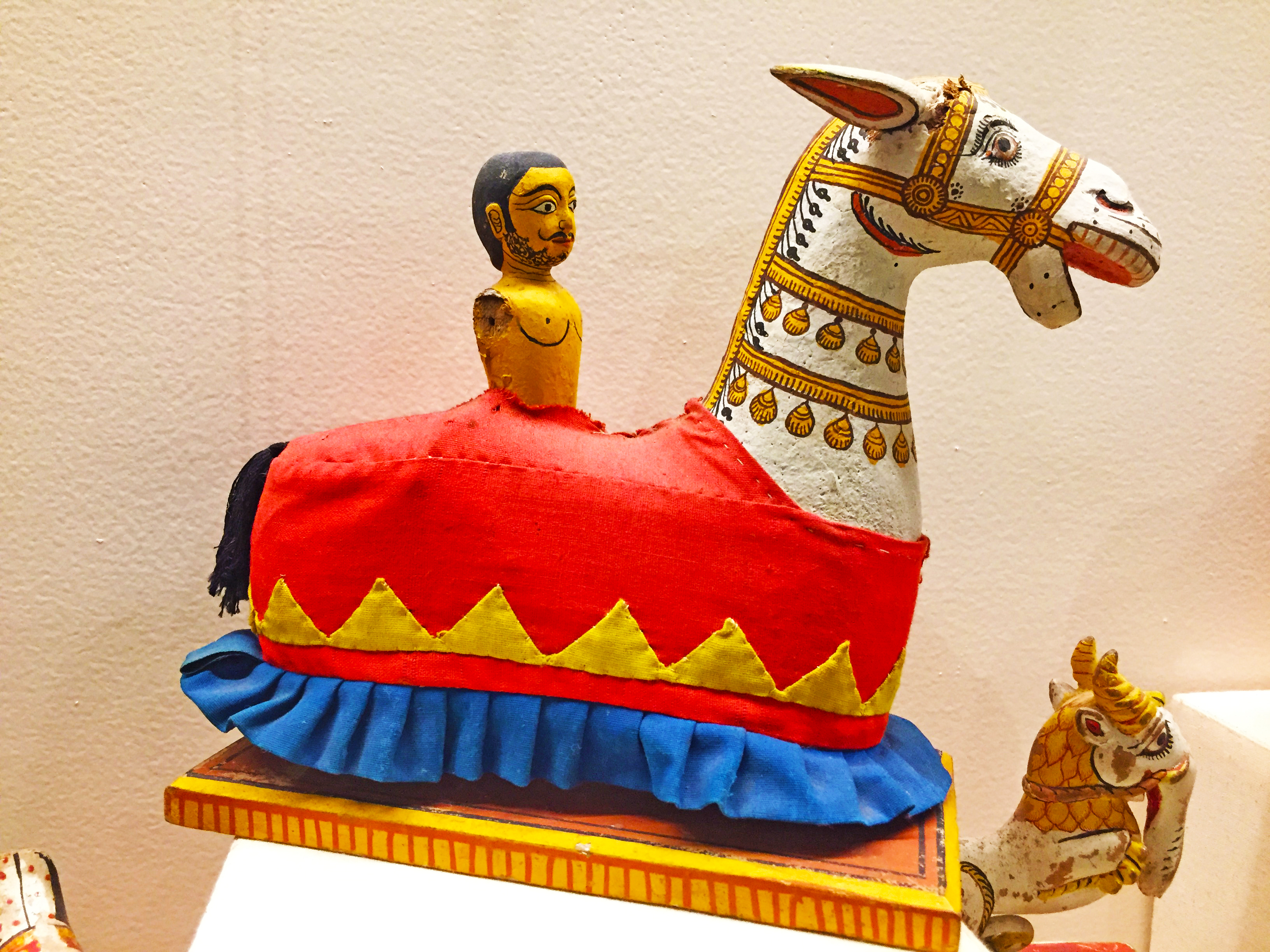

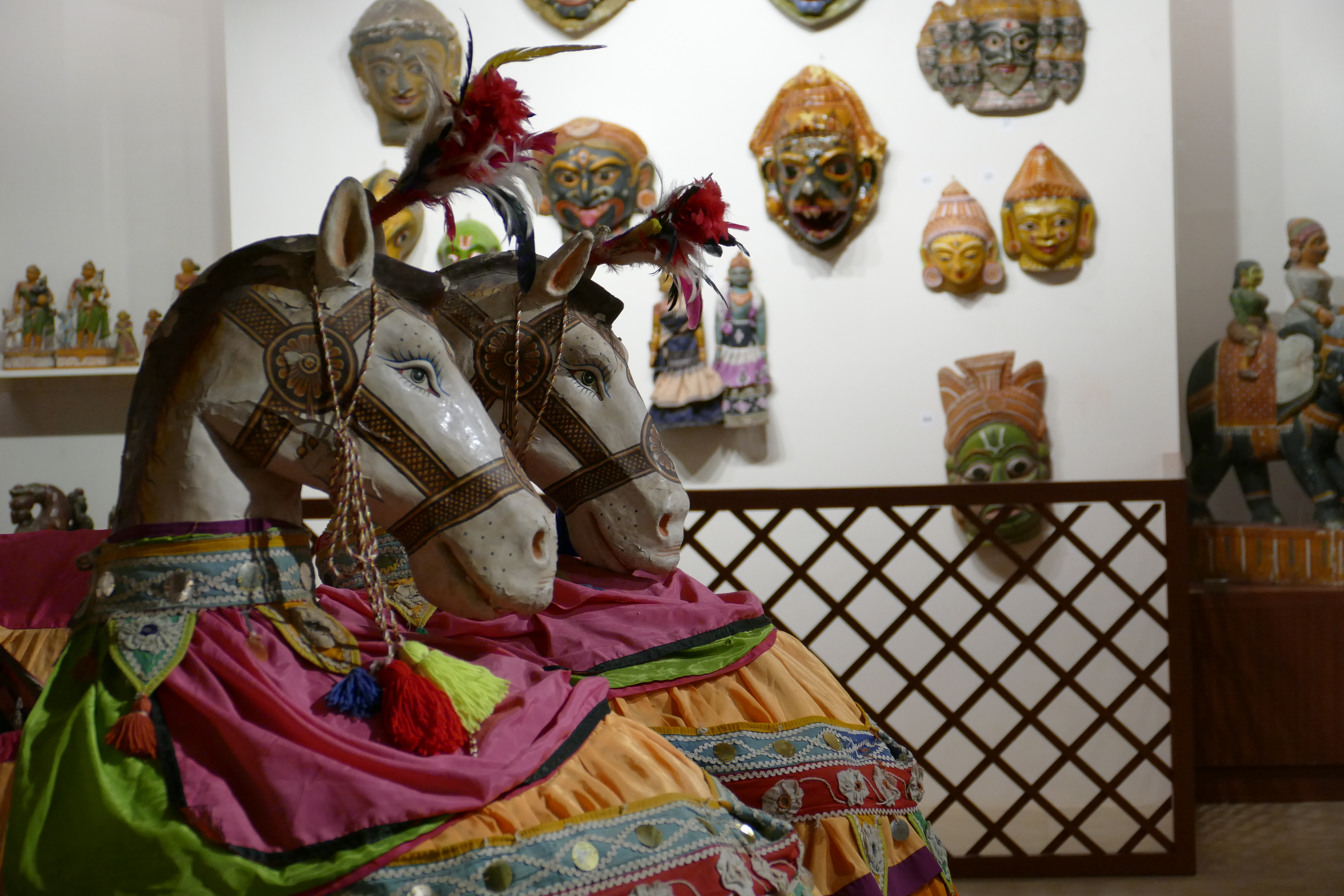
