= Charikawi =

The charikawi is a traditional mimed dance of the Garifuna, in which a hunter encounters a cave man and a cow. The word may also refer to the music for such a dance.
