= Armenian line dance =

Type of dance

The Armenian line dance is an Armenian folk dance, danced at parties and other special occasions. It is performed by a group of people who join hands and do a specific step while walking counter-clockwise. This is just one variation of many different types of line dance. It is done with many different steps and in different styles.
