= Cocolo (dance) =

Dance tradition in the Dominican Republic

Cocolo is a dance drama tradition practiced in the Dominican Republic. It has been inscribed on the Representative List of the Intangible Cultural Heritage of Humanity by UNESCO in 2008, though the original proclamation came in 2005.

The tradition developed among the descendants of British Caribbean sugar-plantation slaves, also called Cocolo. The performances unite "music and dance genres of African origin" with "plots, legends, and figures derived from biblical and medieval European literature." In the past, Cocolo troupes used to perform at "Christmas, on St Peter's day, and at carnival activities." Now, only one aging troupe remains.
