= Maach =

Form of Indian folk theatre

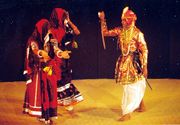
- A Maach performance
- Native name: माच
- Etymology: manch ('stage' in Hindi)
- Genre: Musical Theatre
- Instrument(s): sarangi, harmonium, dhol
- Inventor: Gopalji Guru
- Origin: Malwa region in Madhya Pradesh

Maach is a form of folk theatre from the Malwa region of the Indian state of Madhya Pradesh.

== Origin ==
Maach is thought to have originated from the Khyal theatre form of Rajasthan which spread out of the state and is thought to have, besides itself and Maach, also given rise to other North Indian folk theatre forms of Nautanki in Uttar Pradesh and Swang in Haryana. In Madhya Pradesh, Maach is said to have been introduced by Gopalji Guru who himself authored several Maach plays. Another hypothesis looks at the Maach as having originated from the Turra Kalagi troupes that accompanied the Maratha forces into Central India in the 18th and 19th centuries where it evolved into a staged performance replete with new stories, costumes, singing and dancing.

== Themes ==
Maach derives its name from the Malvi word maach which means a stage. It is a sung folk theatre that has a semi sacred character, blending religious and secular themes within it. Many of the themes are historical, borrowing from local legends and tales of warriors and rulers but they also borrow from the Puranas and the Hindu epics of Mahabharata and Ramayana. The tales of Raja Gopichand, Prahlad, Nala and Damayanti and the Malwan heroes Tejaji and Kedar Singh often feature in these plays. While they act as storehouses of local history and heritage, in recent years Maach performances have also focused on contemporary issues such as dacoity, literacy and landless labour.

== Music ==
Music is a key element of Maach performances and draws extensively from Hindustani classical ragas with words and tunes set to reflect the season or occasion on which the play is staged. The sarangi, harmonium and dhol are common accompaniments.

== Performances ==
Maach is thought to be a two or three century old tradition which was shaped by the religious developments of the 19th century. While originally associated with the festival of Holi, it is now performed on many occasions. Although a form of theatre, acting is under-emphasised and the theme unfolds through the songs and dances in the play. The background of the play is set by curtains and the dancers usually double up as singers. It is a sung drama with only occasional use of speech.

Maach is performed on a raised stage or manch which gives it its name. Traditionally, all the roles were performed only by men who would also don the role of female characters. Since singing is an integral element of Maach, players are noted for their singing voice. Performances open with a rendered bhishti rag before proceeding on to a series of preliminary dances that set an overture. The performance incorporates several elements such as rhyme or vanag, tune or rangat and dialogue or bol. Plays begin much after sunset and go on into the early hours of dawn. Humour in the plays are effected through the characters of a shemarkhan or bidhab who act as the king's advisor and the clown who plays a role akin to that of the sutradhar. The climax is often a colorful affair with the protagonists of the play often shown dancing amid clouds of coloured powder.
