= Chakkirako =

Japanese festival dance

Chakkirako (Japanese: チャッキラコ) is a dance performed at a festival in Miura, Japan, to celebrate the New Year and bring good fortune, especially in fishing.

In 1976, Japan's government recognized this dance as an intangible cultural heritage to be protected. In 2009, it has been inscribed in UNESCO's Representative List of the Intangible Cultural Heritage of Humanity. In 2022, the inscription was revoked and the dance incorporated into the broader subject of Furyu-odori.

The dance originated in the Edo period with influences by the dances of visiting sailors. By the mid-eighteenth century, it had become a showcase for local girls. Every year in the middle of January, ten to twenty girls in colorful kimono between the ages of 5 and 12 perform the dance at a shrine or in front of houses. They are accompanied by five to ten older women singing a capella.
