= Gaur Maria Dance =

Gaur Maria dance is performed in plateau of Bastar in Chhattisgarh. It is performed on the occasion of marriage and is believed that it is performed with more joy than other dances. Gaur dance is a popular folk dance of Madhya Pradesh dances. Gaur dance is popular in the Sing Marias or Tallaguda Marias of South Bastar.

Men put head-dresses with stringed 'cowries' and plumes of peacock feathers and make their way to the dancing ground. Women ornamented with brass fillets and bead necklaces with their tattooed bodies also join the gathering. The men beat the drums, tossing the horns and feathers of their head-gears to the rising tempo that gives the dance a wilder touch. It is performed to praise the spirit of hunting among the tribe. Here hunting procedure is depicted while dancing.

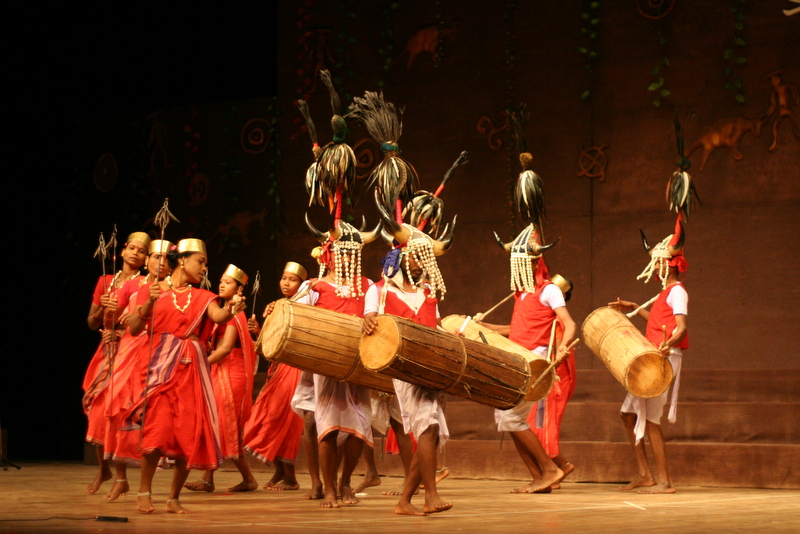
Gaur Maria dance
