= Bereznianka =

Bereznianka (Ukrainian: Березнянка) is a popular folk dance from southwestern Ukraine (Transcarpathia). It is performed by amateurs, professional Ukrainian dance ensembles, as well as other performers of folk dances, and was popularized by choreographers such as Klara Balog.
