= Orunyege-Ntogoro =

Folk dance of western Uganda

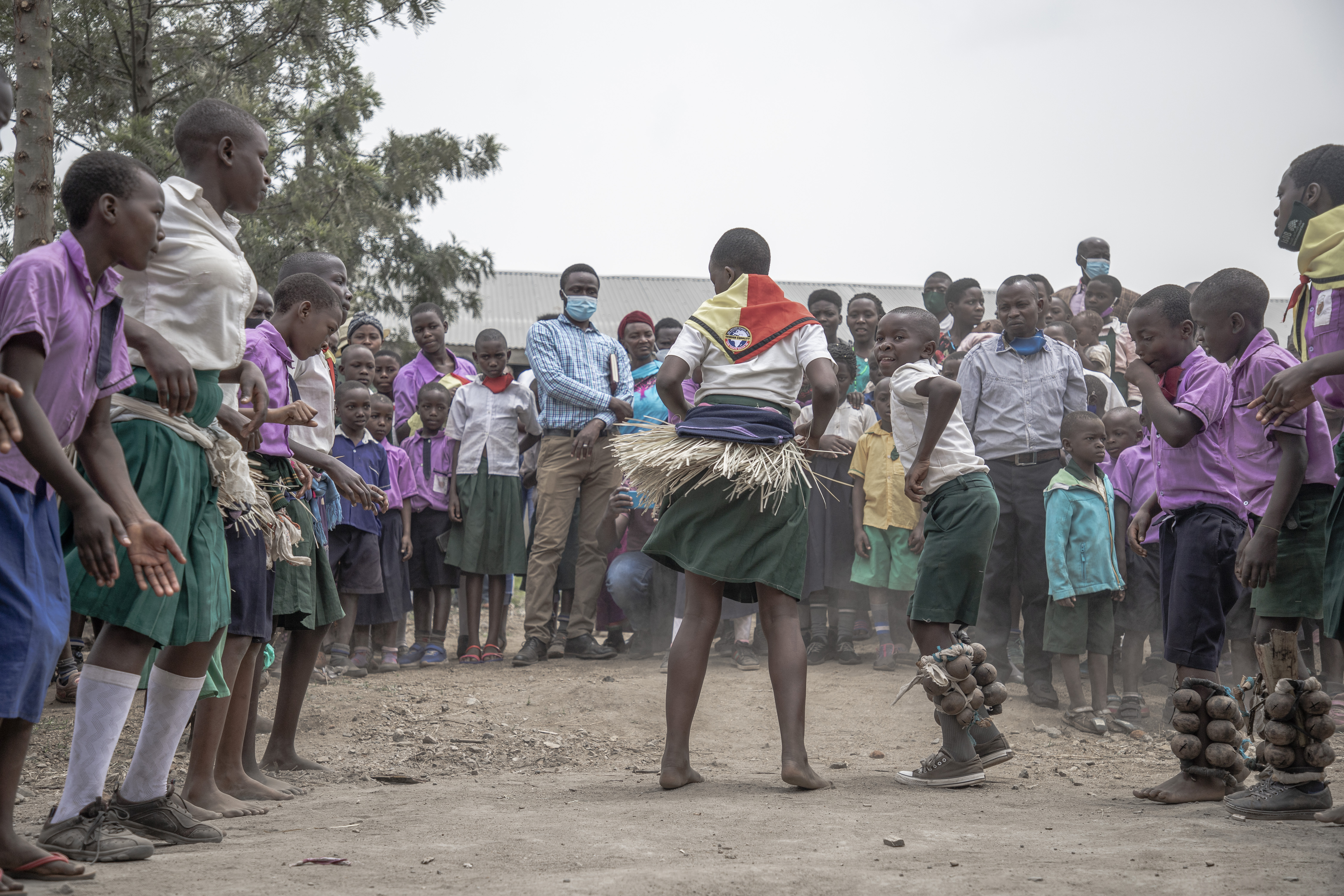
runyege dance of bunyoro / tooro

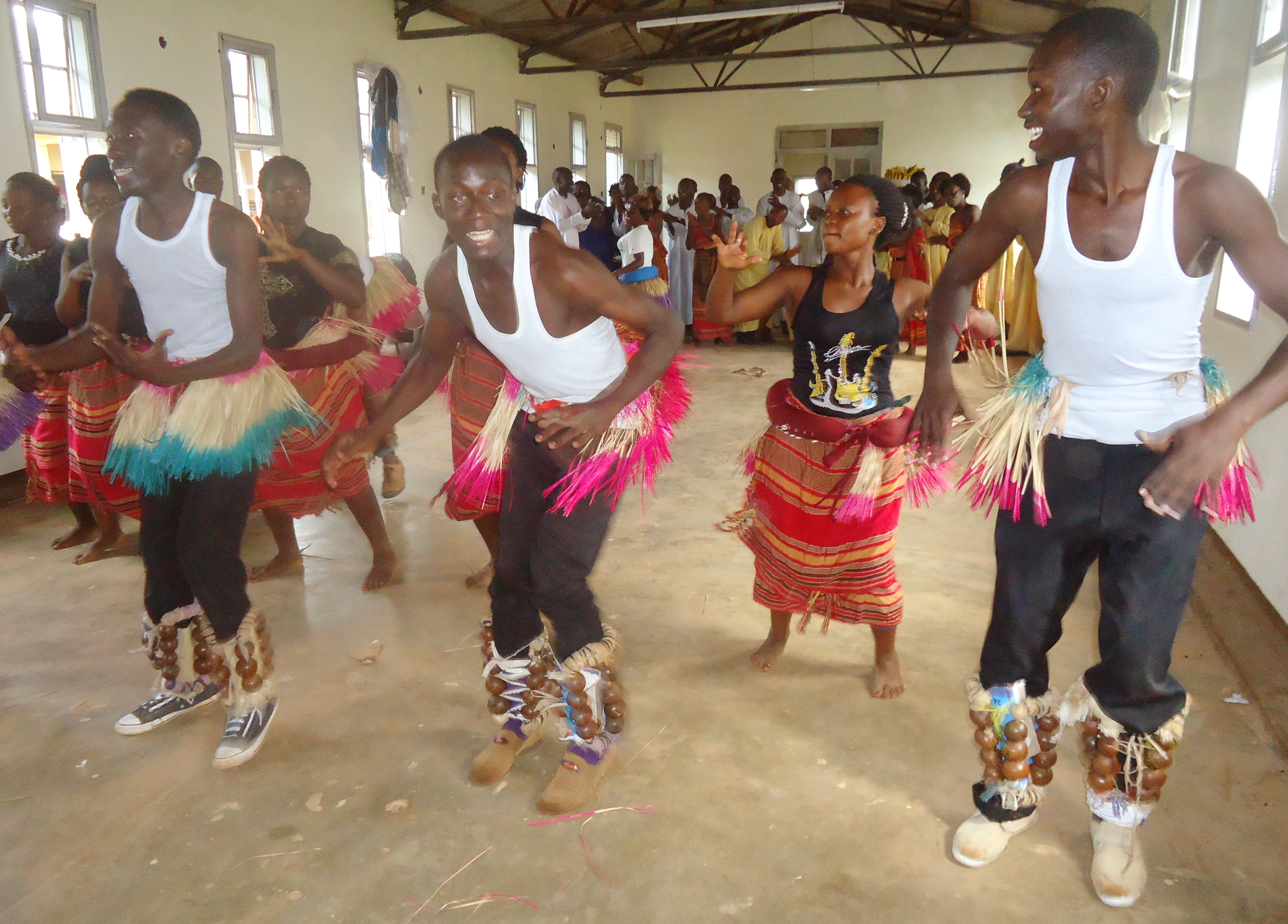
Dancers from Bunyoro

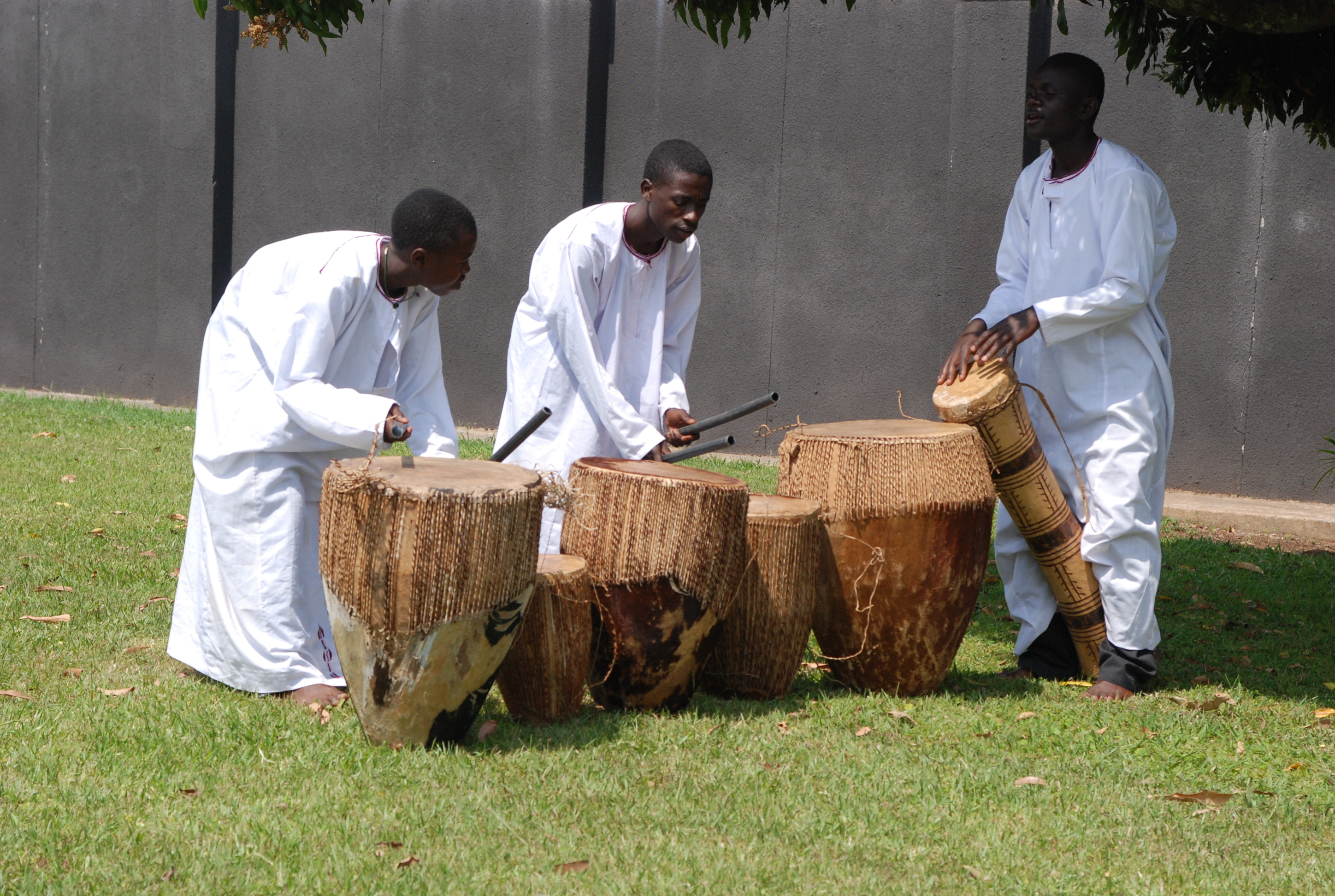
Drums used during Orunyege-Ntogoro dance

Orunyege-Ntogoro, also known as Orunyege or Entogoro, is a traditional courtship dance performed by the Batooro and Banyoro communities of western Uganda. The dance holds significant cultural importance in both the Bunyoro and Tooro kingdoms, serving as a primary method for young adults to select potential marriage partners and express courtship intentions, as well as during weddings, initiation ceremonies, and social gatherings.

The name "Entogoro" derives from the distinctive pod rattles called ebinyege in the Rutooro language, which male dancers tie to their legs to create rhythmic accompaniment during performances whereas Orunyege/ Ntogoro are names associated with the dance. These rattles, along with rings (entogoro), are essential elements that distinguish this dance form from other Ugandan traditional dances.

== History ==
Orunyege-Ntogoro has been passed down through generations both as a social and ceremonial dance. Its origins can be traced back to the Bunyoro-Kitara and Tooro Kingdoms. according to history it acted as a way for young people to compete in physical activity and stamina to influence potential partners and families.

Orunyege-Ntogoro is a combination of two dances: Orunyege and Ntogoro. Orunyege comes from Hoima and Fort Portal districts, while Ntogoro comes from Masindi district. The two dances have similar origins and characteristics but differ in some respects. Orunyege is more energetic and acrobatic, while Ntogoro is more graceful and elegant.

The dance dates back to the pre-colonial era when the Bunyoro and Tooro kingdoms were powerful and influential in the region. The dance was a way of celebrating the culture and identity of the people, as well as expressing their love and affection. The dance was also a means of socialization and entertainment, as the young people would gather in the evenings and dance under the moonlight.

=== Contemporary practice ===
Today, Orunyege-Ntogoro continues to be performed at cultural festivals, tourism events, and traditional ceremonies throughout western Uganda. The dance has adapted to modern contexts while maintaining its essential cultural characteristics and significance. Cultural groups and traditional dance troupes regularly perform Orunyege-Ntogoro for both local audiences and international visitors seeking to experience authentic Ugandan culture. The dance remains an important element in cultural education programs and is taught in schools and cultural centers as part of efforts to preserve Uganda's diverse cultural heritage. Modern performances often incorporate contemporary staging and presentation techniques while preserving the traditional movements, rhythms, and cultural meanings.

== Performance ==
Orunyege-Ntogoro is performed by two groups of dancers: the male dancers (abakwongezi) and the female dancers (abakwetegerezi). The male dancers wear shorts and shirts, and tie rattles (ebinyege) made of dried gourds or calabashes on their legs. The female dancers wear long skirts and blouses, and tie rings (entogoro) made of beads or cowrie shells on their waists. The rings are used to accentuate the movements of the hips, while the rattles are used to create sounds that match the drumbeats.

The dance is characterized by its energetic movements and the rhythmic sounds produced by the ebinyege rattles worn by male participants. Female dancers typically wear traditional attire and participate in graceful movements and adornments like waist ring ( entogoro) and beadwork that complements the more vigorous male performances. The dance serves multiple cultural functions within Batooro and Banyoro society. During wedding ceremonies, initiation rites, and other significant cultural events, Entogoro provides entertainment while maintaining its traditional role as a courtship ritual. The performance allows young people to demonstrate their physical prowess, cultural knowledge, and social status to potential partners and their families.

The dance consists of several steps and formations, such as circles, lines, and pairs. The dancers move in sync with each other, following the cues of the master of ceremonies and the drummers. The dancers also improvise and showcase their individual skills and styles, such as spinning, jumping, and shaking. The dance is a display of agility, coordination, and creativity.

The dance is accompanied by drums, flutes, and xylophones. The drummers play different patterns and rhythms, depending on the mood and tempo of the dance. The flutists and xylophonists play melodies and harmonies that add to the musicality and beauty of the dance. The dance is led by a master of ceremonies (omukama), who sings and chants praises and jokes to the dancers and the audience.

== Oral tradition V Contemporary settings ==
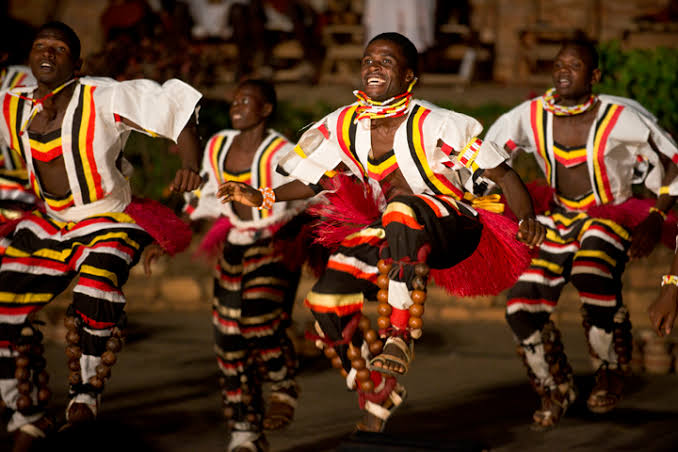
Orunyege-ntogoro dance

Oral accounts recorded in Ugandan popular media link Orunyege/Entogoro to a courtship contest narrative in which multiple suitors sought to marry the same woman, prompting elders to organise a public dance competition as a way of selecting the most suitable husband. In this telling, the winner is the dancer who demonstrates the greatest stamina and control, while the first man to tire is eliminated, reflecting expectations that a husband should be physically capable of providing for and protecting a household during hardship such as drought or famine.

In contemporary settings, Orunyege-Ntogoro is frequently presented in formalised performances by organised ensembles, including at school-based cultural festivals, where choreography and costuming follow established stage conventions that have developed over decades. Ethnomusicologist Linda Cimardi describes runyege (the wider performance genre that includes singing, instrumental music, dance, and acting) as a key medium through which Banyoro and Batooro communities stage ideas of "local culture," often reproducing a gender binary that is framed as traditional, while also creating space for some performers to negotiate gender expression through performance choices.

== Significance ==
Orunyege-Ntogoro is a dance that reflects the culture and values of the Bunyoro and Tooro people. The dance embodies the values and social structures of the Batooro and Banyoro communities, emphasizing the importance of cultural continuity and traditional practices in mate selection. The performance of Orunyege-Ntogoro also serves as a form of cultural preservation, allowing older generations to pass down traditional knowledge, musical skills, and social customs to younger community members. The dance is often performed alongside other traditional activities such as the Empaako naming ceremonies and various seasonal celebrations. it plays a role in community togetherness and entertainment.

Orunyege-Ntogoro is also a dance that has a practical and educational purpose. It is a dance that teaches the young people about the norms and expectations of their society, especially regarding courtship and marriage. It is a dance that allows the young people to interact and communicate with each other, and to express their feelings and emotions. It is a dance that helps the young people to find and choose their suitable partners for marriage.

== See also ==
- Bunyoro
- Culture of Uganda
- Nyoro people
- Tooro Kingdom
- Tooro people
