= Okayama (dance) =

Okayama (岡山) is a Japanese kōwaka-mai of the hōgan-mono genre (works about Minamoto no Yoshitsune) composed in the Muromachi period.

It tells the story of the bereaved relatives of Satō Tsugunobu and Satō Tadanobu, two of Yoshitsune's retainers. The text of the work has been connected to a passage in the Gikeiki, and it is a sequel to the kōwaka Yashima. The libretto survives in a single manuscript in the holdings of Tenri Central Library.

== Genre and date ==
Okayama is a kōwaka-mai of the hōgan-mono genre. Hōgan-mono refers to works on the theme of the 12th-century military general and folk hero Minamoto no Yoshitsune, who late in his career held the office of captain of the guard (判官 hōgan or hangan).

== Plot ==
At Takadachi, Yoshitsune is asked by Nikō (尼公, an honorific title for a noblewoman who has become a nun), the mother of his fallen retainers Satō Tsugunobu and Satō Tadanobu, to act as the eboshi-oya for the two brothers' fatherless children. Yoshitsune agrees to sponsor them in their genpuku ceremony, and names the two Yoshinobu (義信) and Yoshitada (義忠). Fujiwara no Hidehira welcomes the two into his house. Tsugunobu and Tadanobu's widows become nuns with the assistance of Musashibō Benkei, and the two women join their mother-in-law Nikō and travel as pilgrims around Mutsu Province until they come to a place called Okayama, where they build a hut and die peacefully together.

== Relation to other works ==
The dance forms a pair with the other kōwaka known as Yashima, and combined form a kind of "Tale of Nikō" (尼公物語).

Book eight of the Gikeiki contains a passage that is nearly identical to the first half of this work.

== Textual tradition ==
Only one manuscript of the libretto survives: the Bunroku-bon (文禄本) copied by Ueyama Munehisa (上山宗久), which is in the possession of the Tenri Central Library. The library published a facsimile in it Mai no Hon Bunroku-bon (ge) (舞の本文禄本・下).

== Works cited ==
- Kami, Hiroshi (1983). "Okayama". Nihon Koten Bungaku Daijiten 日本古典文学大辞典 (in Japanese). Vol. 1. Tokyo: Iwanami Shoten. p. 468. OCLC 11917421.
