= Walking Boston =

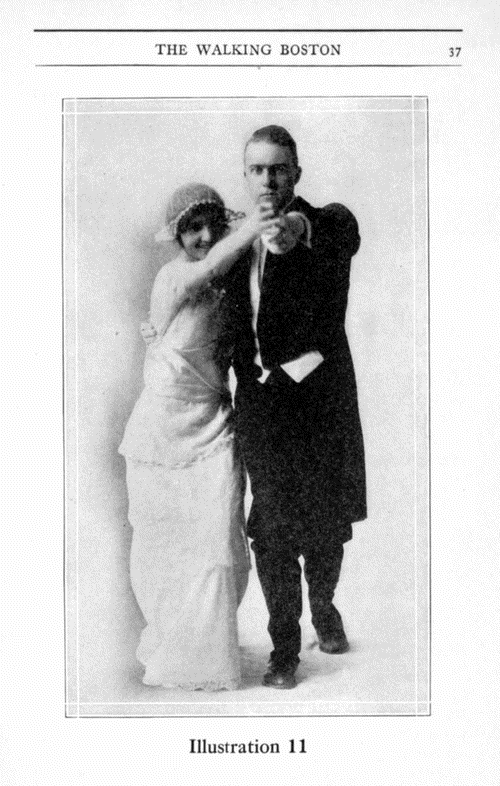
The Walking Boston

The Walking Boston, sometimes designated the One Step Waltz, is a very simple dance in which many graceful figures may be introduced. It is done to the same music as the Hesitation Waltz and Dream Waltz.

The man starts forward with his left foot and the lady backward with her right, simply walking to waltz time, counting one, two, three to each step. At each step the dancers rise on their toes. Four of these steps are taken forward (backward by the lady), then they balance backward and forward. As the dancers balance they make a quarter turn to the man's right to the one, two, three count of the music--four of these quarter turns making the complete revolution. Throughout this turn the man keeps his right foot and the lady her left on the floor, using it as a pivot on which to turn.

Now the man steps backward with his left foot and the lady forward with her right, taking four steps. Then balance, and instead of four quarter turns to the one, two, three count of the music, make two half turns in the same time.

The dance includes a great deal of "balancing". Indeed, the Walking Boston cannot be performed easily or gracefully unless the balancing is done properly. Balancing means throwing the weight of the body successively on to one foot and then on the other. This is done with one foot well in advance of the other. Good dancers get plenty of swing into their action. Swing forward. Swing backward. In balancing on to the forward foot, the backward foot should barely leave the floor, and in no event should it be brought forward. And in balancing onto the backward foot the forward foot should not be brought backward.

The above are the fundamental figures of the Walking Boston. There is no rule governing the number of steps to be taken forward or back, the number of times to balance, or the number of turns to be made. This is left entirely to the pleasure of the dancers. The number four mentioned in the preceding was merely illustrative.

The fundamental figures may be varied by skipping, the man on his left foot, the lady on her right. This skipping step is made by the man on his left foot only, and by the lady on her right only, thus making every other step a skipping step.

Another figure may be introduced by the couple taking a position both facing forward.

Four steps are taken forward, dipping on the fourth step (see Illustration 11), then back four steps and turn.

Couple starts forward, the man with his left foot and the lady with her right, taking three steps, making a little skip as the third step is taken; this skip is on the man's right foot and the lady's left; they balance twice, then repeat.

The man starts forward with his left foot and the lady with her right, taking five steps forward, skipping on each step. Balance twice, then turn the body around without changing the position of the arms and take four steps in the opposite direction, skipping on each step as before; then turn as described previously.

It is common for dancers to do the turn after each of the figures, but the order of the figures is optional with the dancers.

1. Both starting with the left foot, take four steps forward; on the fifth step, change position, the man crossing over behind the lady without releasing the hands or losing a step; three more steps forward and then cross back again; then three more steps forward. In other words, this is merely twelve steps forward, changes of position being made on the fifth and ninth steps. Completion of these twelve steps leaves the dancers in the same position as at the start.
2. Now, without losing a step or getting out of time with the music, both dancers one step straight to the side with the left foot, then backward with the right foot and dip. Again sideways with the left foot and backward with the right and dip, and so on for ten or twelve steps, keeping on a straight line to the left.
3. Repeat # 1.
4. Grapevine, dipping on the backward step.
