= Zonaradiko =

Zonaradiko (Greek: Ζωναράδικος) is a traditional Greek folk dance from Thrace (Greece) that is named after the dance's handhold. Dancers hold the adjacent dancer's zonaria (belt) during the dance. Zonaradiko is a village line dance done in one form or another all over Greece. In each village the dance will look somewhat different, but the basic structure is essentially the same. The same dance is done in Bulgaria under the name Pravo. The variations below are a collection of steps commonly done by folk dancers throughout the US and as seen done by various groups in Greece.

Many variations of the dance exist. In northern Thrace, zonaradikos turns into a fast tsestos. In western Thrace, the dance is led by the males, and the females follow towards the end of the line. As the dance nears the end, the first dancer moves to the centre and the others twist around him, then they "untwist" and go back to their normal positions.

Mixed lines of men and women, holding belts. The leader is on the right. When the tsestos portion starts, either the entire line does the tsestos steps, or those doing the tsestos steps form a new belt-hold line inside (towards the center) of the original line. Traditionally, some or all of the men would leave the line and the women would either stop and watch or continue the pravo around the men's line. The entire dance is done with the knees bent. This position is especially evident in the tsestos.

Songs like Lianohortarouthyia (Λιανοχορταρούδια), Steryios Pismanipsi (Στέργιος Πισμάνιψι), and Vasilkouda (Βασιλκούδα) are all zonaradika.

== See also ==
- Greek music
- Greek dances
