= Guapacha (dance) =

Guapacha pronounced "wapacha", is a modern afro-Cuban partner dance that is a fusion of Cha-cha-cha and hip hop, promoted in 2006 by Strictly Dance Fever TV program.

== See also ==
- Guapacha timing
