= Pāʻōʻā =

Modern dance from Tahiti, French Polynesia

The pāʻōʻā (often written as paoa, as the Tahitian is not punctilious about writing accents), is a modern dance from Tahiti where the dancers sit on their knees in a circle on the ground, sing and tap with their hands on their thighs on the rhythm of the music, which is a quite repetitive scanning refrain. Selected members, one boy and one girl, dance inside the circle. Being selected is an honor—it symbolizes recognition from one's teacher. The whole scenario has something of a rooster fight (not common on Tahiti). Coincidentally the theme of the dance is usually from the hunt or from fishing.
