= Folk dance =

Dance that reflects the life of the people of a certain region

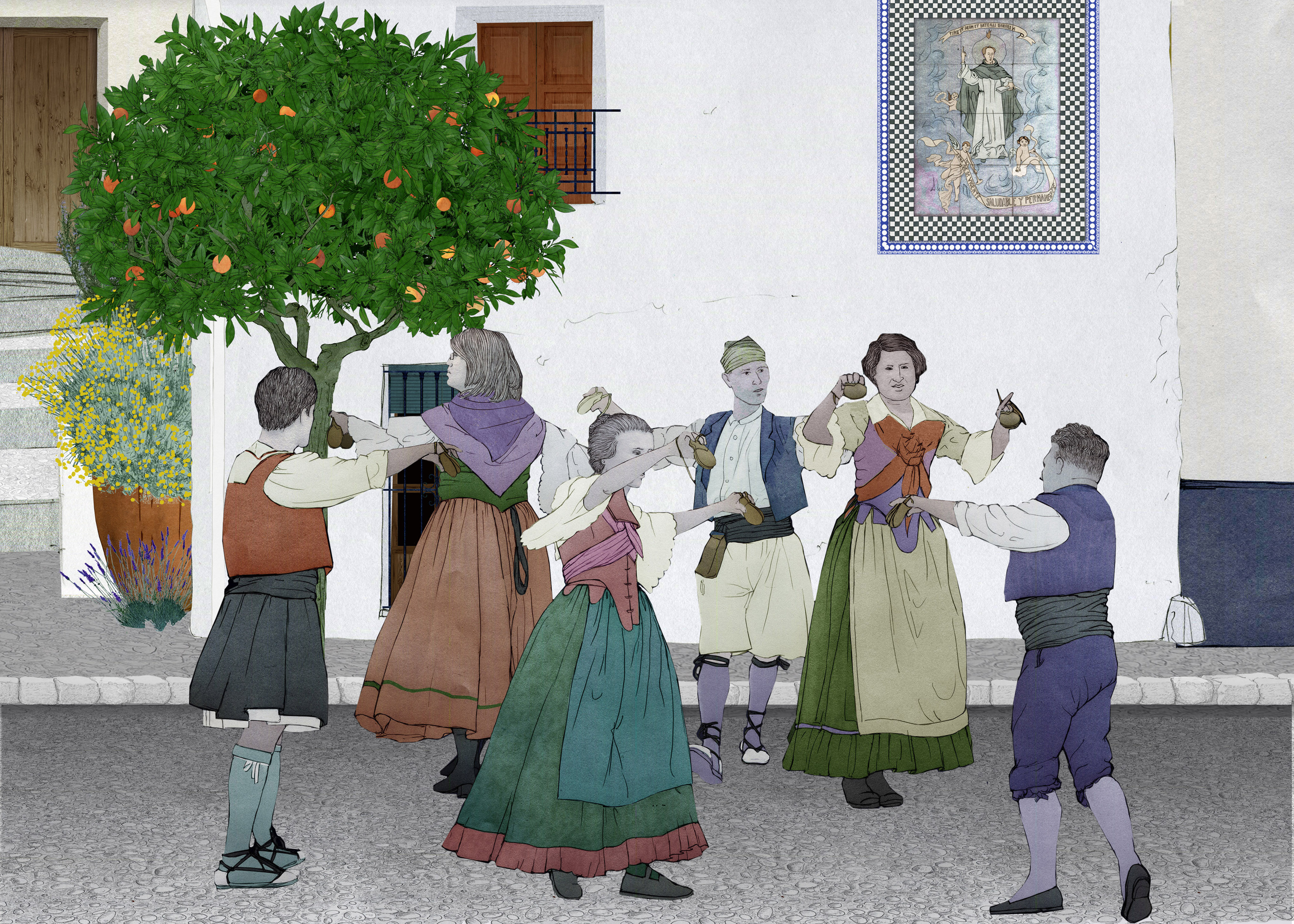
Traditional Valencian dances.

A folk dance is a dance that reflects the life of the people of a certain country or region. Not all ethnic dances are folk dances. For example, ritual dances or dances of ritual origin are not considered to be folk dances. Ritual dances are usually called "religious dances" because of their purpose.

The terms "ethnic" and "traditional" are used when it is required to emphasize the cultural roots of the dance. In this sense, nearly all folk dances are ethnic ones. If some dances, such as polka, cross ethnic boundaries and even cross the boundary between "folk" and "ballroom dance", ethnic differences are often considerable enough to mention.

== Background ==
Traditional dancers and performance during the Pulljay festivities in Tarabuco.

Folk dances share several commonly recognized characteristics:

- They are typically performed at social gatherings or community events by people with little or no professional training, often accompanied by traditional or folk music.
- Folk dances generally originate as participatory social activities rather than as staged performances, although some may later be adapted or stylized for theatrical presentation.
- Their form and execution are primarily guided by inherited traditions transmitted across generations, reflecting local or regional identities, though gradual adaptation and change are common.
- New dancers typically learn through informal means—by observing, imitating, and receiving assistance from more experienced participants—rather than through formal instruction.

Modern social dances such as hip-hop and other street styles have often evolved spontaneously within communities, but the term folk dance is generally not applied to them. Instead, they are more commonly referred to as street dances or vernacular dances. The term folk dance is typically reserved for dance forms that are significantly bound by tradition and that originated during periods when a clear distinction existed between the dances of the “common folk” and those of the social elite, many of which later evolved into modern ballroom and theatrical dance forms.

== Europe ==
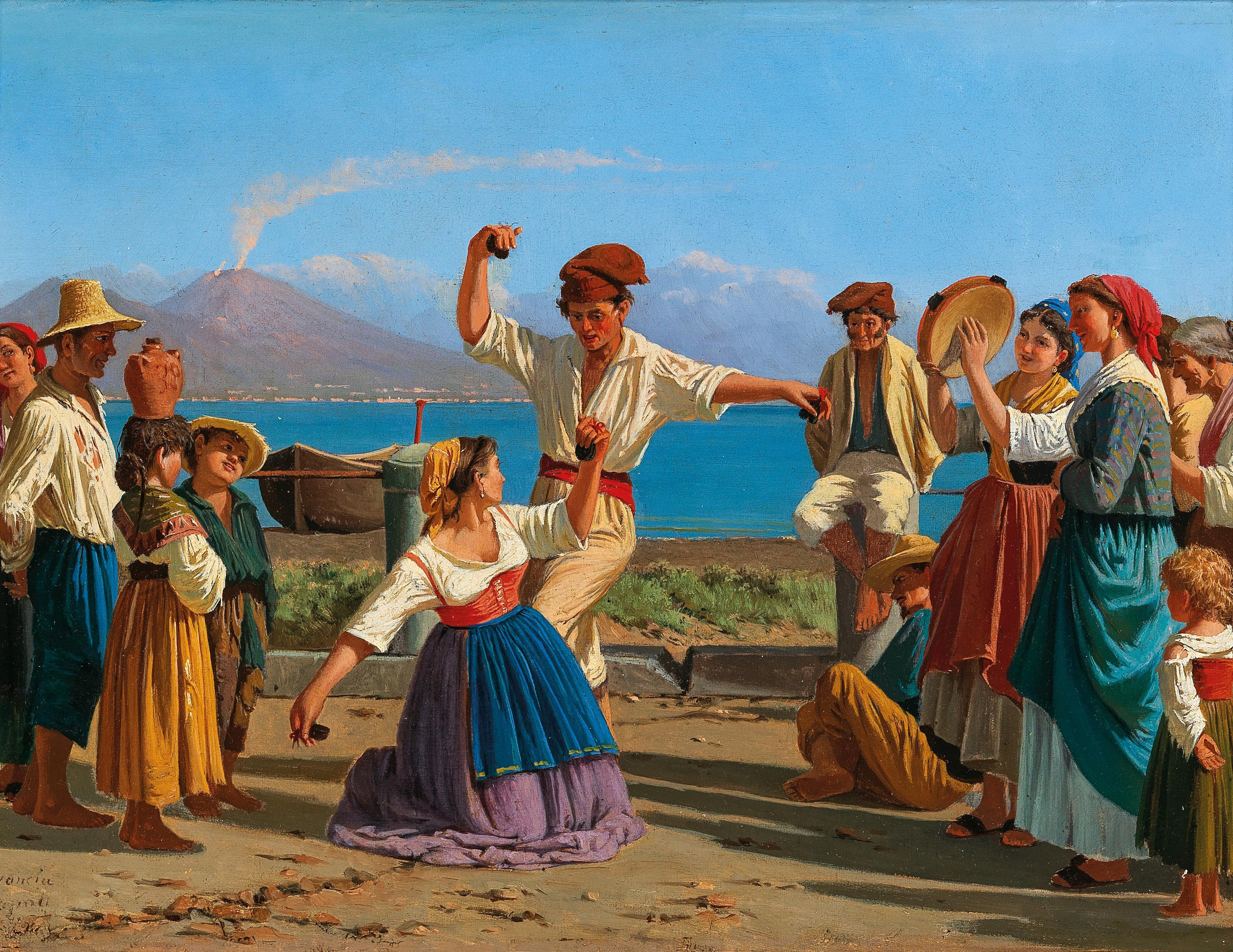
Italians dancing the tarantella.

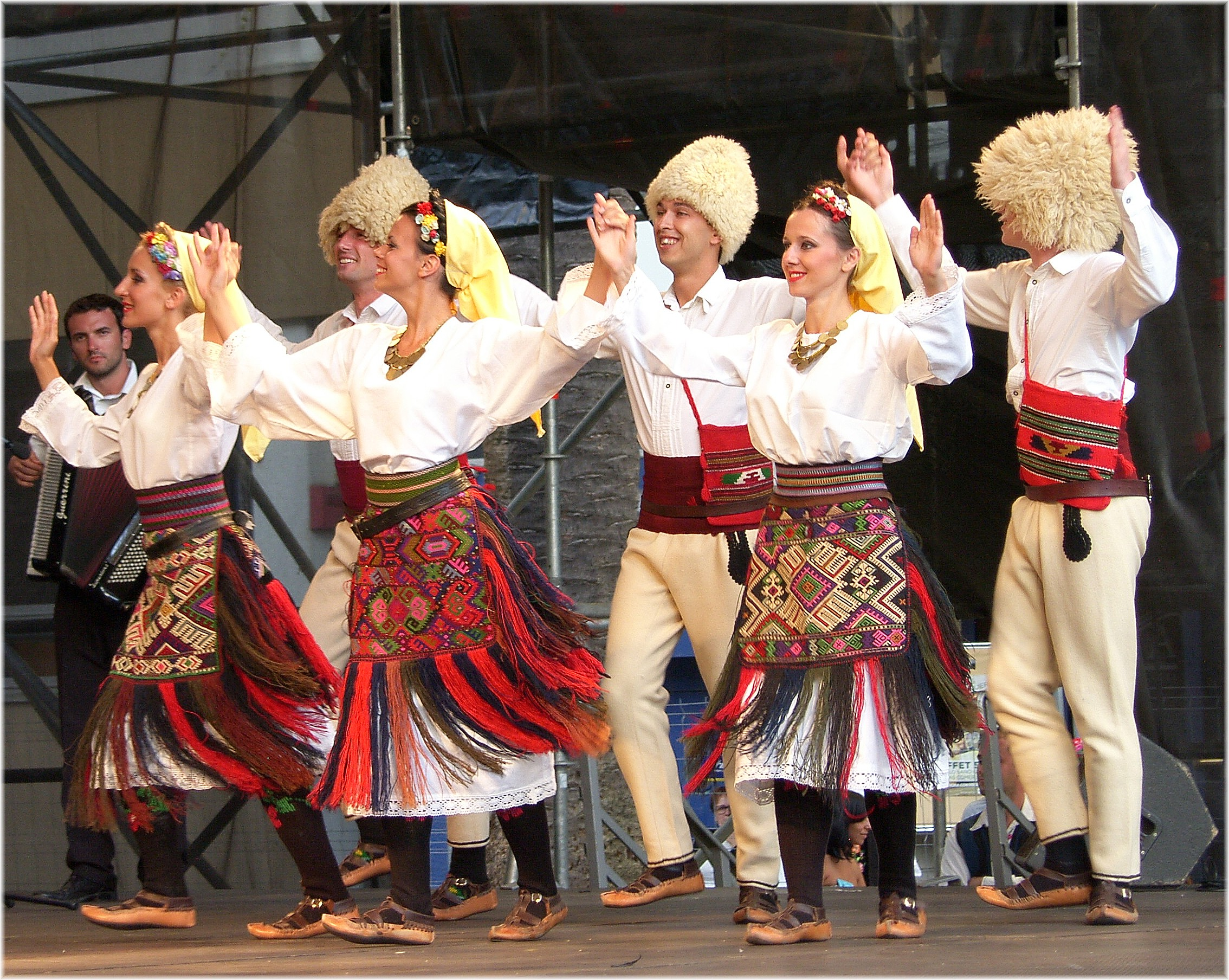
Serbian folk group dancing at a festival.

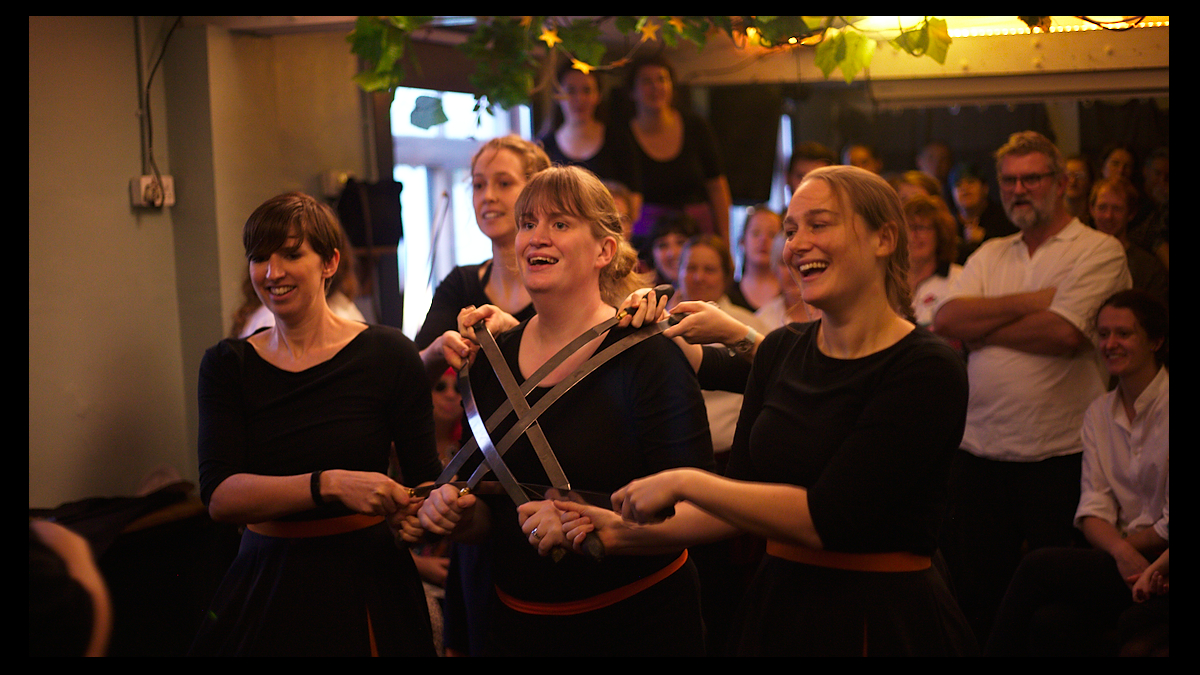
Rapper Sword Dancers - Sheffield Steel.

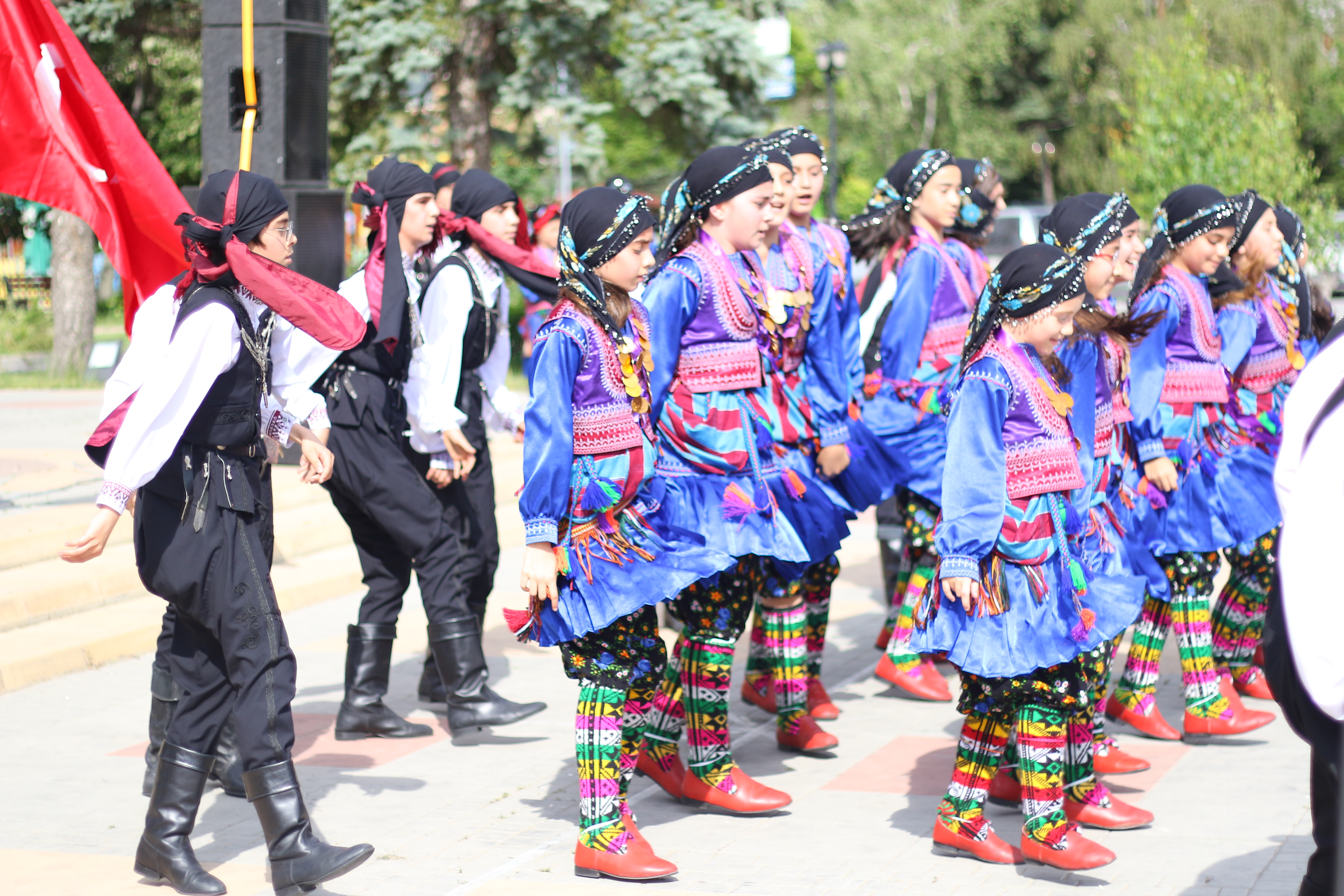
Turkey folk dance.

Sword dances include traditional forms such as long sword dances and rapper dancing. Some choreographed social dances, such as contra dance, Scottish highland dance, Scottish country dance, and modern Western square dance, are sometimes described as folk dances, though this usage is not accurate in the strictest ethnological sense.

Country dance shares historical and stylistic features with both contemporary folk dance and ballroom dance. Many country and ballroom dances trace their origins to earlier folk traditions, having undergone gradual refinement and formalization over time.

Folk dances often developed long before the establishment of modern national or political boundaries, resulting in certain dance forms being shared across multiple countries and cultures. For example, several Serbian, Bulgarian, and Croatian dances exhibit closely related steps, styles, and musical structures, and in some cases even share the same names and melodies.

International folk dance groups exist in many cities and on college campuses around the world, where participants learn and perform traditional dances from a wide variety of cultures for recreation and social connection.

Balfolk refers to social dance events featuring live folk-inspired music, popular primarily in Western and Central Europe. The movement originated during the folk revival of the 1970s and has grown in popularity since around 2000. Balfolk events typically include partner dances that were fashionable across Europe in the late 19th century—such as the schottische, polka, mazurka, and waltz—along with a variety of regional and traditional dances, mainly from France, but also from Sweden, Spain, and other European countries.

Varieties of European folk dances include:

- Austrian folk dance
- Ball de bastons
- Barn dance
- Bulgarian dances
  - Pravo horo
  - Paidushko horo
  - Gankino horo
  - Daychovo horo
- Circle dance
- Dutch crossing
- English country dance
- Fandango
- Flamenco
- Freilekhs
- Georgian dance
- Greek dances
- Hora
- International folk dance
- Irish dance
  - Ceili dance
- Italian folk dance
  - Tarantella
  - Calabrian Tarantella
  - Pizzica
  - Monferrina
  - Ballu tundu
- Jenkka
- Jota
- Kolo
- Ländler
- Maypole dance
- Morris dance
- Polka
- Polish folk dances
  - Polonaise
  - Oberek
  - Krakowiak
  - Mazurka
  - Kujawiak
- Russian folk dance
- Turkish dance
- Ukrainian dance
- Verbuňk
- Nordic polska dance
- Schuhplattler
- Square dance
- Sword dance
- Weapon dance
- Welsh dance
- Zwiefacher

== Middle East, Central Asia and South Asia ==
The regions of the Middle East, Central Asia, and South Asia are home to a vast array of folk dance traditions that reflect centuries of cultural exchange, migration, and shared heritage across ancient trade routes such as the Silk Road. Folk dances in these areas often feature rhythmic footwork, expressive gestures, and distinctive regional music, serving as integral parts of weddings, festivals, and communal celebrations. In the Middle East, circle and line dances such as the Dabke are performed across Lebanon, Syria, Palestine, and Jordan. Central Asian traditions include energetic group dances such as the Attan of Afghanistan and the Lezginka found across the Caucasus and Central Asia. In South Asia, folk dances such as Bhangra and Giddha from Punjab, Garba and Dandiya Raas from Gujarat, and the Kummi and Kolattam dances of southern India express agricultural, seasonal, and social themes through movement and music.

- Ardah
- Armenian dance
- Assyrian folk dance
- Azerbaijani dances
- Bihu, an Assamese dance celebrating the arrival of spring, traditionally the beginning of the Assamese New Year
- Attan - The national dance of Afghanistan. Also a popular folk dance of the Pashtun tribes of Pakistan, including the unique styles of Quetta and Waziristan in Pakistan.
- Belly Dance
- Bhangra, a Punjabi harvest dance in Pakistan and India, and a music style that has become popular worldwide.
- Chitrali Dance - Chitral, Khyber-Pakhtunkhwa in Pakistan.
- Circassian dance
- Circle dance
- Dabke, a folk dance of the Levant
- Domkach, folk dance of Bihar and Jharkhand, India
- Garba Circular Devotional dance from Gujarat danced the world over
- Israeli folk dance
- Kalbelia is one of the most sensuous dance forms of Rajasthan, performed by the kalbelia tribe
- Khattak Dance - Khyber-Pakhtunkhwa in Pakistan.
- Khigga, a common folk dance among Assyrian people
- Kurdish dance
- Luri dances
- Lewa (folk dance) - Baluch folk dance in Pakistan.
- Mazanderani dances
- Middle Eastern Dance
- Chaap (traditional Baloch folk dance in Pakistan)
- Thabal chongba
- Kyushtdepdi - The national dance of Turkmenistan
- Yowlah

=== India ===
India has a rich and diverse tradition of folk dances, reflecting its regional, linguistic, and cultural variety. Nearly every state and community maintains distinctive dance forms associated with agricultural cycles, festivals, rituals, and social gatherings. In northern India, dances such as Bhangra and Giddha from Punjab and Rouf from Jammu and Kashmir celebrate seasonal and festive occasions, while in western India, Garba and Dandiya Raas from Gujarat, and Lavani from Maharashtra, blend rhythm and storytelling. Eastern India features dances such as Chhau of Odisha, Jharkhand, and West Bengal, and Bihu from Assam, whereas in southern India, forms such as Kummi, Kolattam, and Oppana are performed during festivals and community events. These dances often emphasize collective participation, traditional costume, and regionally distinct music and instruments.

=== Sri Lanka ===
Main folk dances of Sri Lanka which are associated with folk activities and festivities are; Leekeli (Stick Dance) Kalagedi (Pot Dance) PolKatu (Coconut Dance) Kulu (Harvesting Dance) Rupathnari is a traditional dance form, one of many varied vibrant, cultural and traditional dances of the island nation. Dance styles of Sri Lanka

== East and Southeast Asia ==
East and Southeast Asia encompass a wide range of folk dance traditions that reflect the region's diverse ethnic groups, religious influences, and historical interactions. In East Asia, dance forms such as Bon Odori in Japan, Yangge and Lion dances in China, and Talchum in Korea are performed during festivals and community celebrations, often combining music, costume, and symbolism. In Southeast Asia, folk and social dances like the Tinikling of the Philippines, Ramwong of Thailand, Apsara dance of Cambodia, Zapin of Malaysia, and Legong of Bali, Indonesia, express local legends, agricultural traditions, and ceremonial customs. Across the region, folk dances frequently serve as living expressions of cultural identity and communal harmony.

=== China ===
- Yangge

=== Cambodia ===
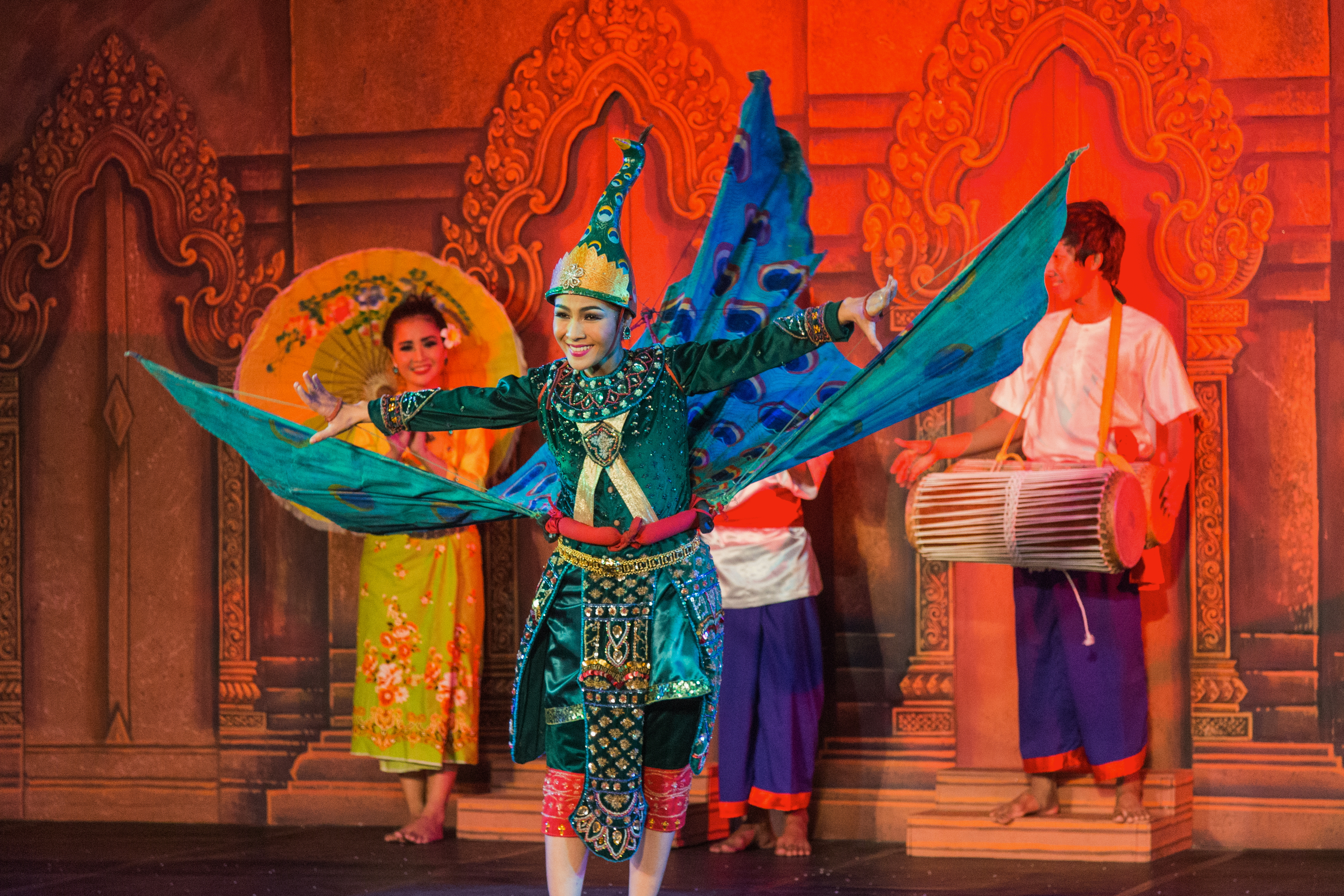
Cambodian Peacock dance.

- Romvong
- Rom kbach
- Robam Neary Chea Chuor
- Peacock Dance
- Chhayam
- Cambodian Coconut Dance
- Cambodian Fish Dance
- Trot dance

=== Indonesia ===
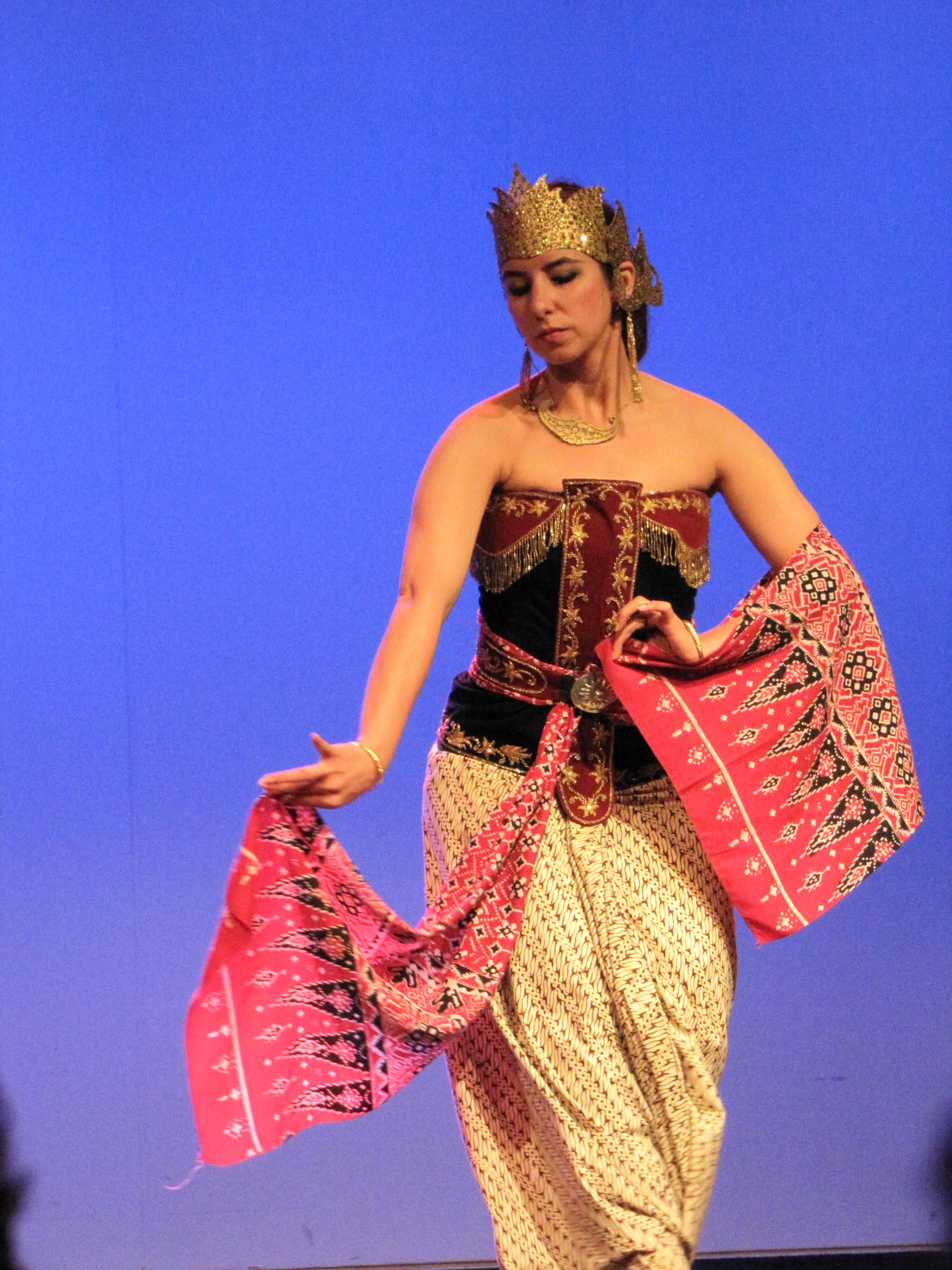
Javanese dancer performing Srimpi dance in Java, Indonesia.

- Saman

=== Japan ===
- Bon dance
- Buyō, typical dance of the Japanese geishas or dance artists
- Rimse (Ainu people)
- Kachāshī (Okinawa)

=== Korea ===
- Nongak

=== Malaysia ===
- Zapin

=== Nepal ===
- Tamang Selo dance
- Jhaure dance
- Lakhey nach dance
- Newari dance
- Manjushree dance
- Kaura dance
- Majhi nach dance
- Raute dance
- Chhokara dance
- Khyali dance
- Maruni dance
- Deuda dance
- Chaulo dance
- Dhan Nach dance
- Madikhole dance
- Phagu (dance)
- Sorathi
- Sakela (Chandi)
- Singaru
- Tarbare
- Bajrayogini dance
- Charitra dance
- Jat-jatin
- Charya dance
- Hanuman dance

=== Philippines ===
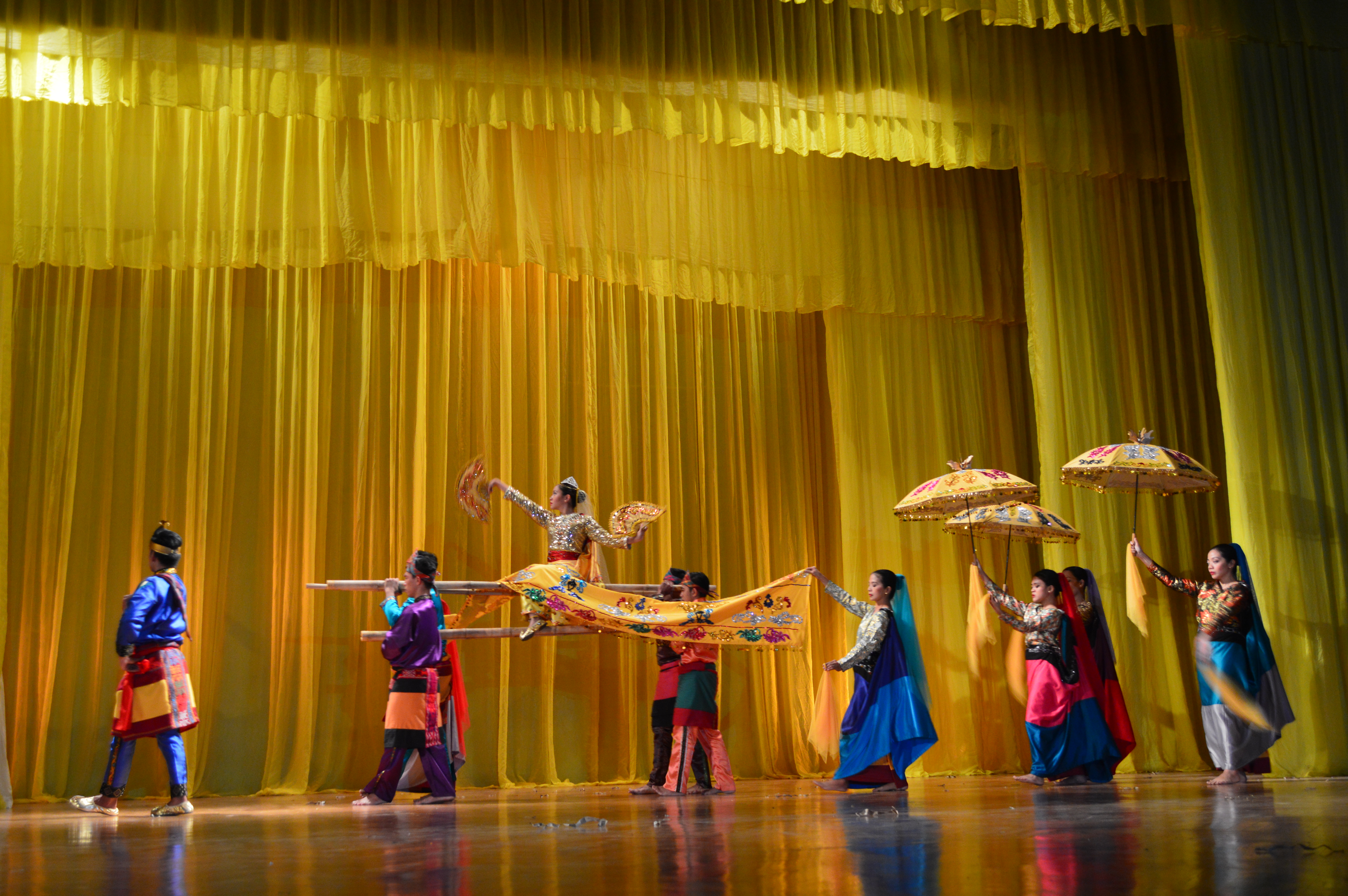
Singkil, traditional folk dance of the Maranao people of the Philippines depicting parts of the epic poem, Darangen.

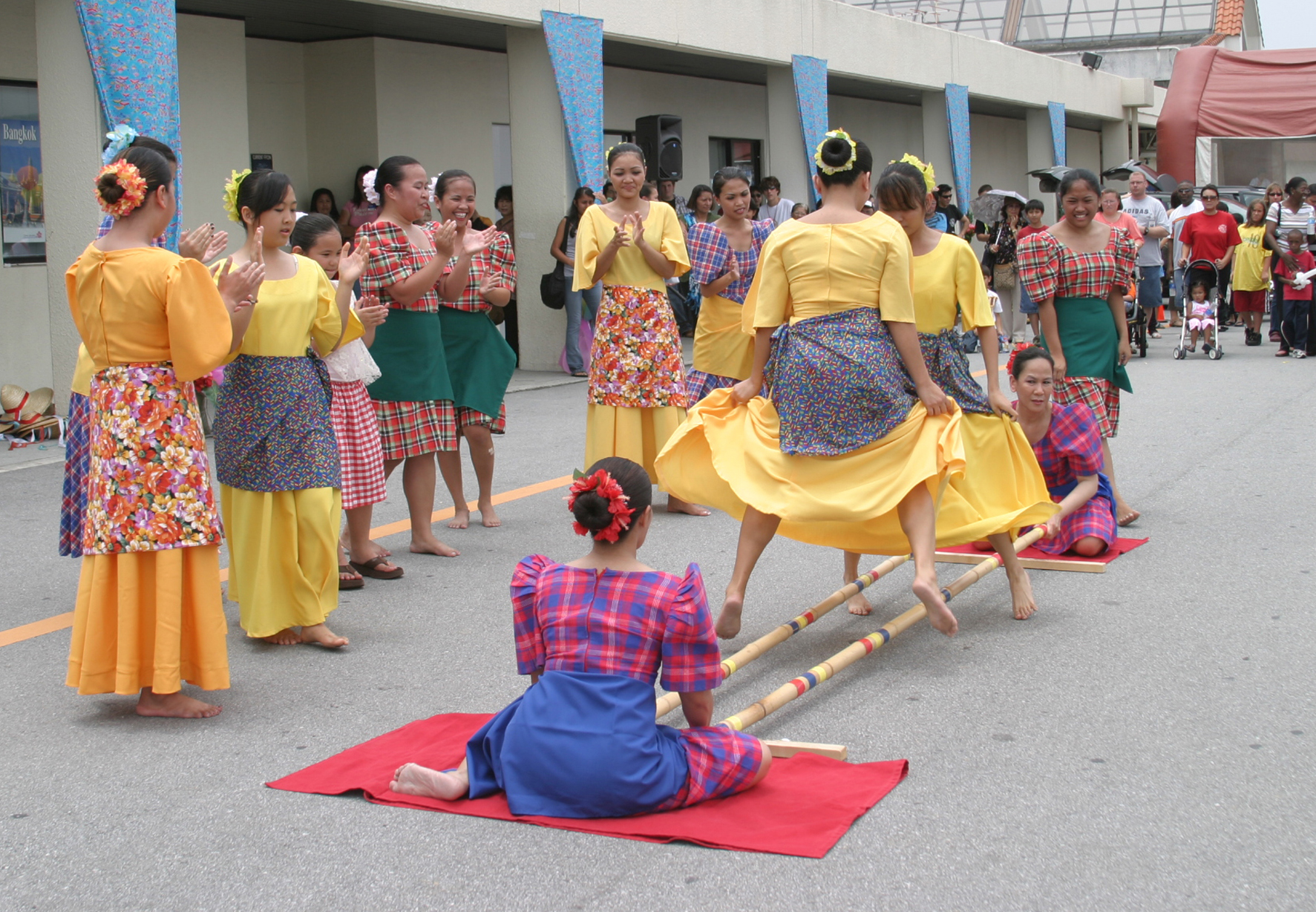
Members from the Philippine Cultural Dancers group perform tinikling during the 2007 Asian Pacific Heritage Month celebration at the Kadena Air Base, Japan.

- Balse Marikina
- Benjan
- Binasuan
- Cariñosa
- Habañera Botoleña
- Itik-itik
- Kalesa
- Kuntao Silat Amil Bangsa
- Kuntaw
- Kuratsa
- La Jota Moncadena
- Lerion
- Magkasuyo
- Maglalatik
- Pagdiwata
- Pandanggo
- Pangalay
- Paraguanen
- Pista
- Sagayan
- Sayaw sa Bangko
- Singkil
- Subli
- Tiklos
- Tinikling

=== Taiwan ===
- Bamboo dance (Amis people)

== South America ==
=== Argentina ===
- Chacarera
- Bailecito
- Zamba
- Gato
- Cueca
- Chamamé
- Malambo

=== Bolivia ===
- Bailecito
- Cueca
- Huayno

=== Brazil ===
- Samba

=== Chile ===
- Cueca

=== Colombia ===
- Cumbia

=== Peru ===
- Marinera
- Huayno

=== Venezuela ===
- Gaita Zuliana
- Joropo

== Africa ==
=== Angola ===
- Kizomba

=== Cameroon ===
- Ambasse bey
- Assiko
- Bikutsi

=== Ghana ===
- Adowa
- Agbadza
- Agbekor (Atamga)
- Kpanlogo
- Bobobo
- Alkayida

=== Niger ===
- Bitti Harey

== North America ==
=== United States ===
- Clogging
- Contra dance form
- Country–western dance
- Modern dance
- Modern Western square dance
- Traditional square dance
- Zydeco (dance)

=== Mexico ===
- Baile Folklorico (Mexico and Central America)
- Contradance
- Square Dance

=== Dominican Republic ===
- Merengue
- Bachata

== Oceania ==
- Hula (Hawaii)
- Haka (New Zealand)

== Notable people ==
- Olivia Hussey
- Cheng Xiao
- The Mayyas
- Zhang Ziyi

== Gallery ==
Körtánc - Hungarian (csango) folk dance.

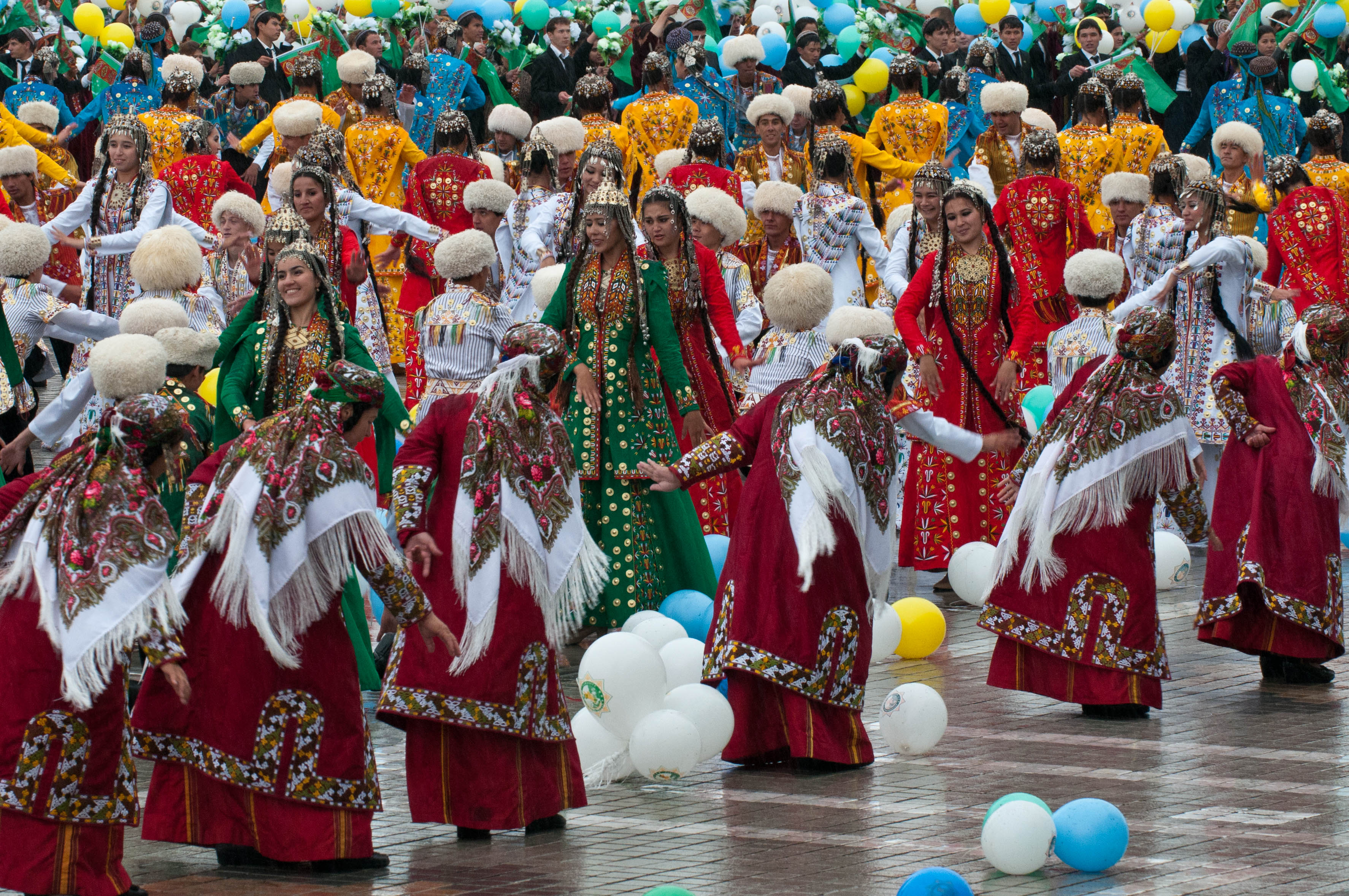
Kyushtdepdi.

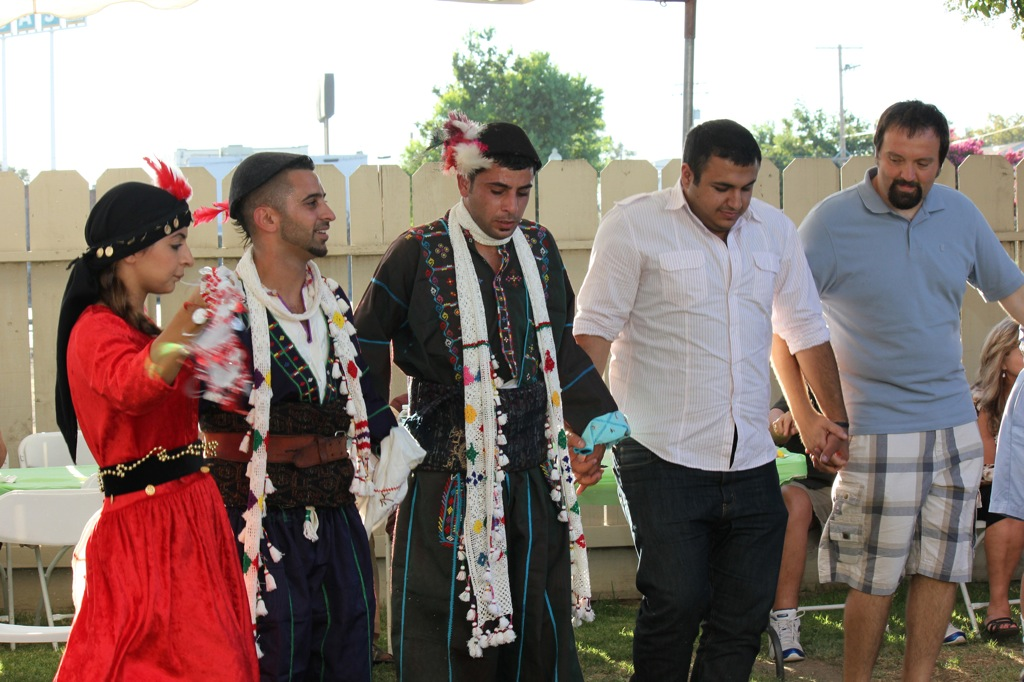
Assyrians dancing khigga.

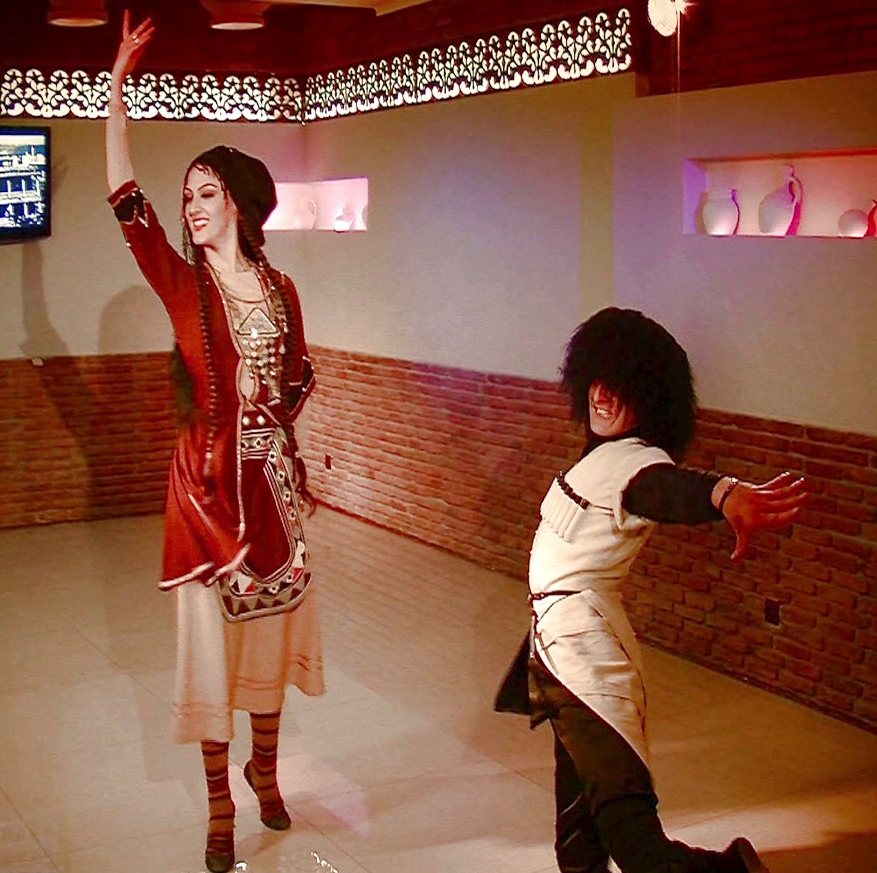
Mtiuluri.

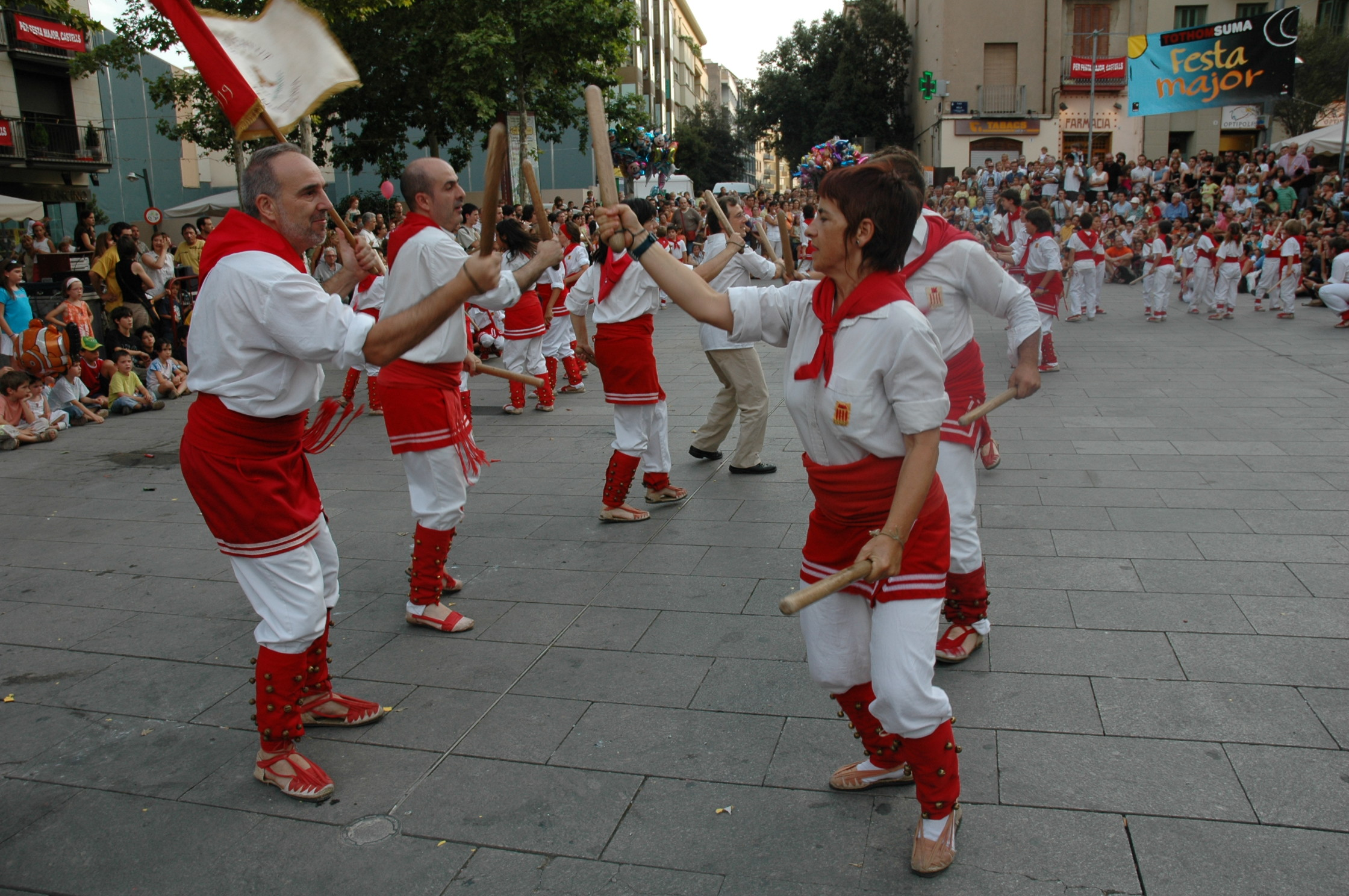
A Ball de bastons stick dance from Catalonia.

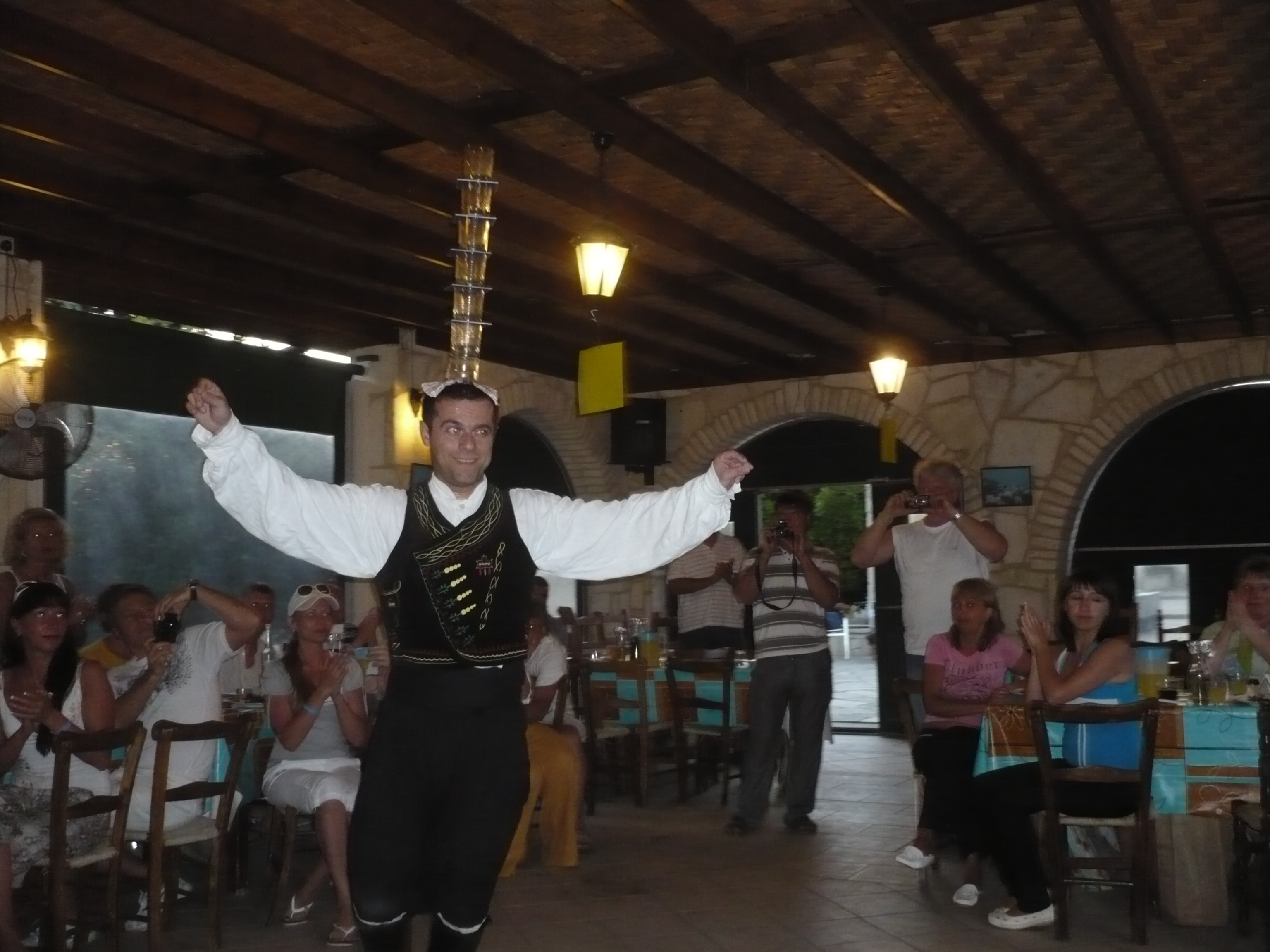
Cyprus folk dance with glasses in Paphos.

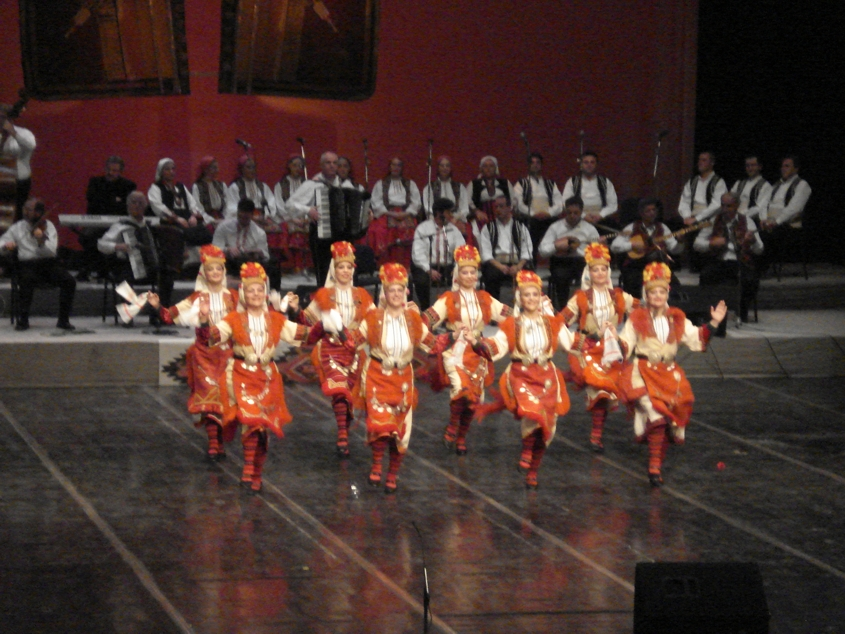
Macedonian female folk dance, Tresenica, performed by Tanec.

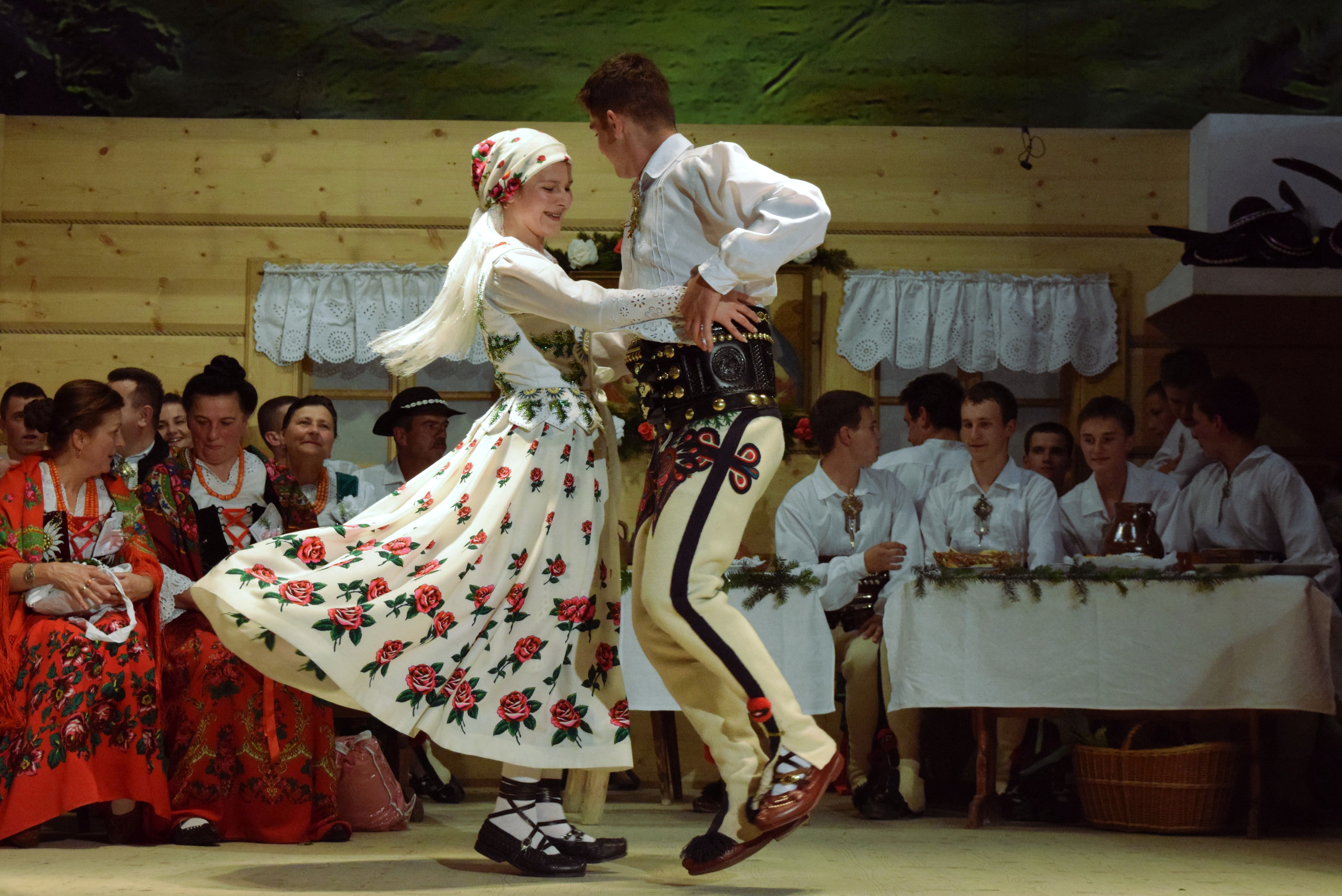
Podhale Gorals dancing.

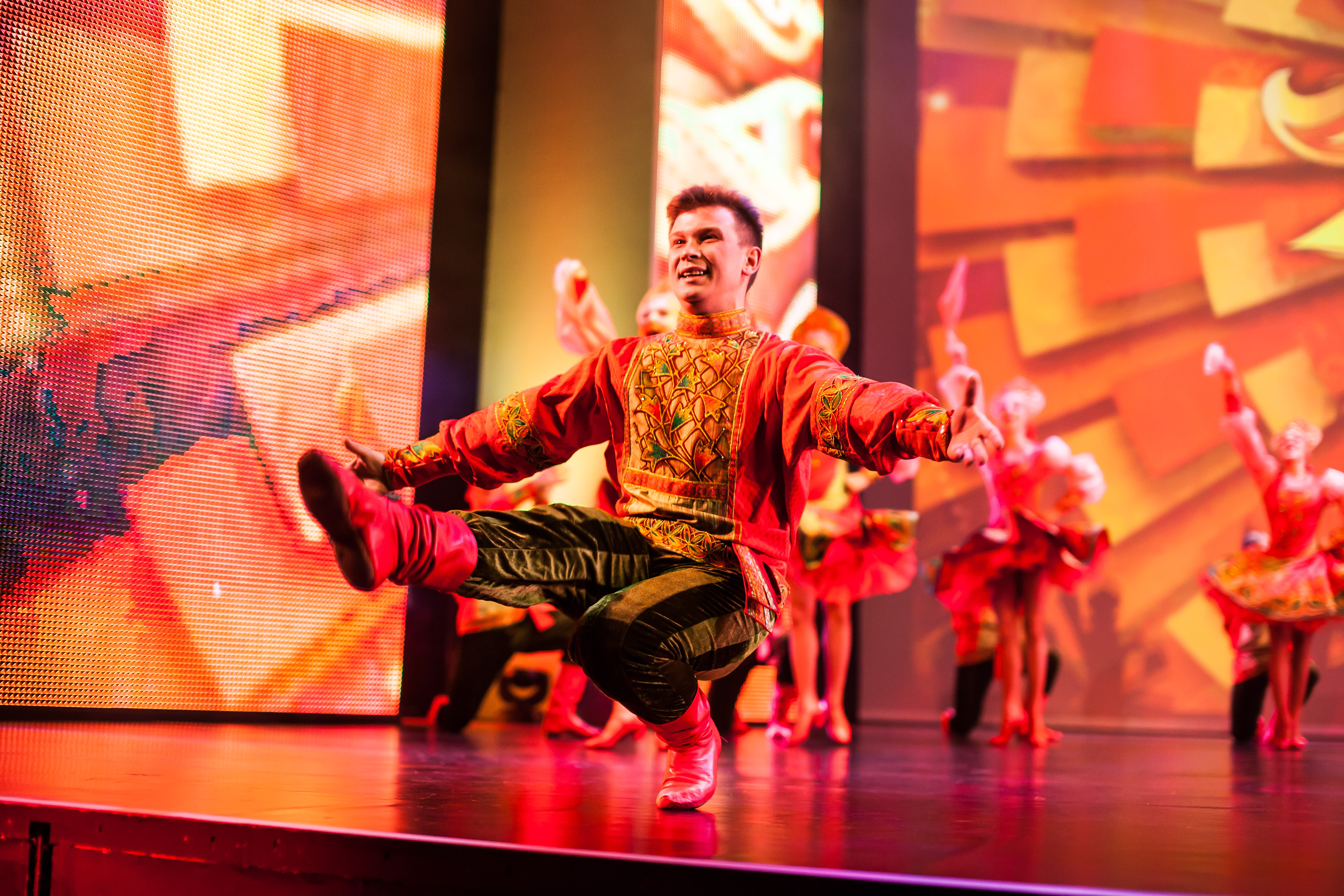
Traditional Russian squat dancing.

== See also ==
- List of ethnic, regional, and folk dances sorted by origin
- International folk dance
- Dance basic topics, a list of general dance topics
- Balfolk, contemporary folk dance practised across Europe

== Sources ==
- Lytle, Tiffany (2023-04-13). "Is My Body My Own?". Conversations Across the Field of Dance Studies. 42. doi:10.3998/conversations.3657. ISSN 2834-6823.
