= Ball de bastons =

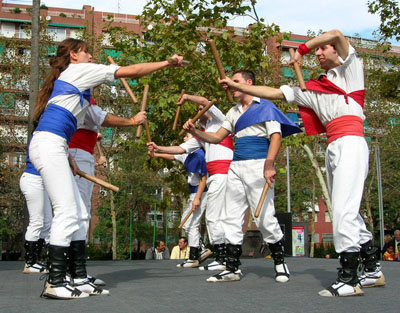
Bastoners in Barcelona

Traditional Catalan folk dance Ball de bastons

Ball de bastons (Catalan pronunciation: [ˈbaʎ də βəsˈtons], lit. 'stick dance') is the name of a ritual weapon dance spread throughout Europe and the rest of the Iberian area, (Note: cossiers in Mallorca; Portuguese: pauliteiros; Aragonese: palotiau; Basque: ezpatadantza; Spanish: paloteo or troqueado) but mostly in Catalonia, Valencia, Aragon and Castile and León where it is UNESCO heritage. English and Welsh Morris dances are well-known relatives to these traditions.

The origins of dance are difficult to reference; first recorded mention dates to 1150, in a banquet of Ramon Berenguer IV, Count of Barcelona.

Most melodies are based on easy 2/4 rhythms. Instrumentarium includes tabor pipe, shawm or bagpipes. Some of these tunes as Villano de Zamora were strikingly popular grounds among European Renaissance and Baroque composers.

The phrase encompasses various traditions, but typically, the dancers carry one or two sticks (bastons), traditionally made of holm oak, measuring about 40–50 centimeters (16–20 inches) long and 5 centimeters (2 inches) thick.

In the most common arrangement, two opposite rows of dancers create intricate stick-clashing patterns. Occasionally, a chief character directs the movements and changes. The dancers often wear white skirts or short trousers, along with red ribbons and ornaments.

== See also ==
- Dandiya Raas
- Călușari
