= Kummi =

Indian folk dance

Kummi is a folk dance, popular in Tamil Nadu and Kerala in India, danced mostly by South Indian women in circle. Dancing may be different. In some places, it is very simple, with rhythmic clapping or beating of the drums. In other places dancers imitate various harvesting activities. Kummi often accompany by songs, called "Kummi songs". It is often danced during festivals. It is also danced by Tamils of Sri Lanka. Kummi songs became a popular addition to kuthiyottam festivities in modern times.

The word "kummi" originated from the Tamil "kommai" (lit."circle"), referring to a dance with hand-clapping, at a time before instruments were invented.

One village woman starts a popular song while others join in with singing and clapping to keep note of time. Songs are performed by the women dancing in circles. Men, when they join form the outer circle.

== See also ==
- Padayani
- Theyyam
