= Kolattam =

Indian folk dance

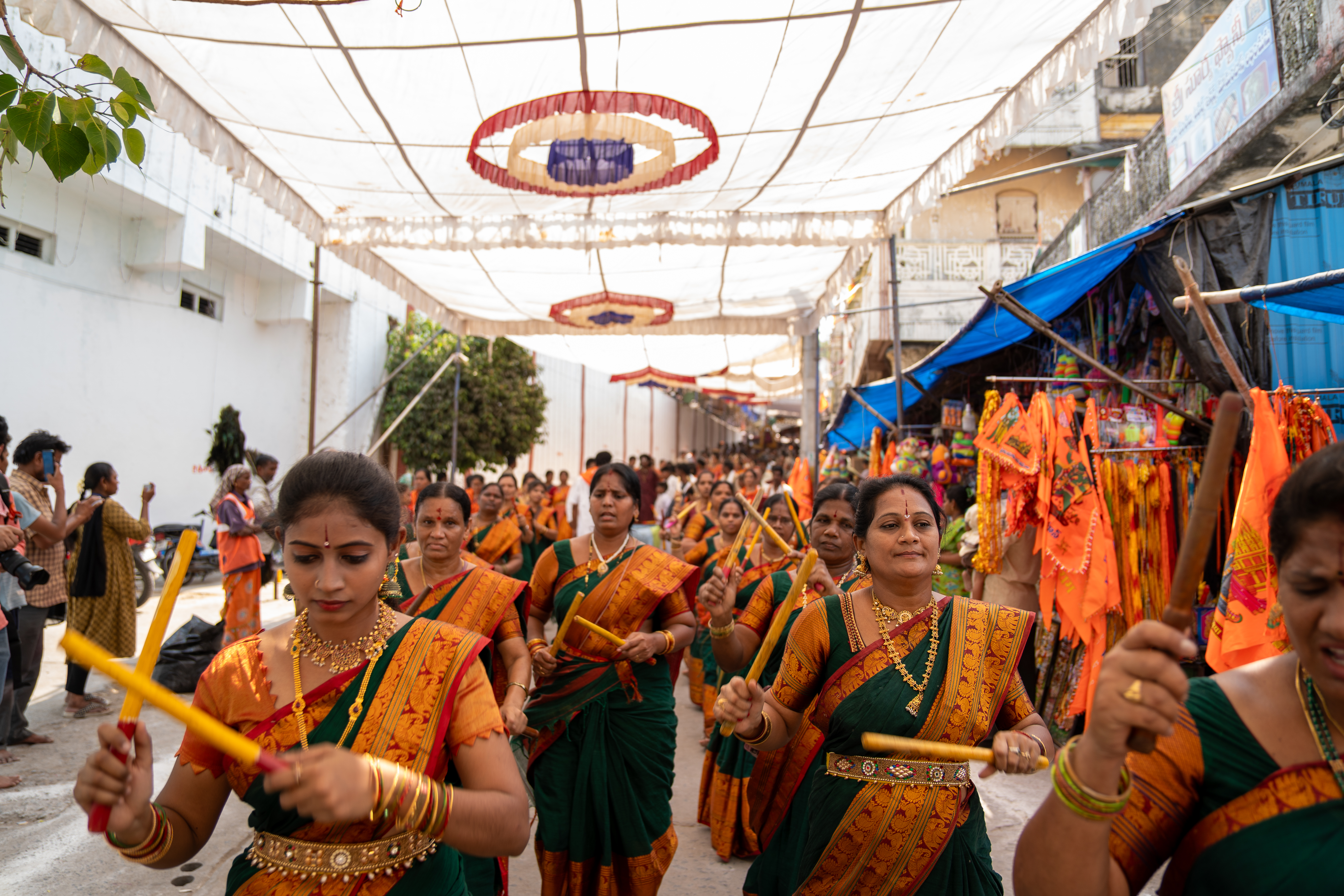
Women dancing Kolattam

Kolattam is an ancient folk dance practiced mainly in Tamil Nadu and Kerala. It is usually performed by women using two short wooden sticks, one in each hand. The dancers generally stand in a circular formation and crisscross the sticks to make specific rhythms while singing folk songs. The dance is usually dedicated to Hindu gods or goddesses and performed during harvest season and village festivities.

== Practice ==
Kolattam is an ancient folk dance of South India, usually performed by women of all ages. It is a community or chorus dance performed in groups. The name "Kolattam" is derived from kol meaning "stick" and attam meaning "dance" in Tamil language. The dancers use two lacquered short sticks, usually made of wood and about 1.5 ft (0.46 m) in length, holding one in each hand. The dancers generally stand in a circular formation and crisscross the sticks together to make specific rhythms while singing various folk songs. The dancers may beat the sticks held in their own hands or pair with the sticks held by other dancers to make the sounds. The dancers may form multiple circles with dancers changing pairs, combining with the members of adjacent circles to make the beats.

== Occurrence ==
The dance is usually dedicated to Hindu gods or goddesses. The dance is performed during the harvest season and for a fortnight in the Karthigai month of Tamil calendar. The dance is often part of village festivities and fairs.

The dance is practiced in South India predominantly in Tamil Nadu and in Kerala and in other regions with significant Tamil diaspora such as Sri Lanka and Malaysia. The dance is performed during religious ceremonies, functions and festivals such as Pongal, generally by women. While the proper dance requires technique and skill with intricate movements, it is practiced by amateur dancers as well.

== Variations ==
There are different variants such as pinnal kolattam (an intricate form of the kolattam) and chakke kolattam. Pinnal kolattam uses ropes instead of sticks. Kummiattam is a folk dance similar to Kolattam, with the difference being that hands are used to make sounds while dancing in kummiattam instead of sticks used in the later. The dancers form a rhythm by clapping the hands in different postures.In Karnataka it is known as Kolata. Dandiya Raas practiced in Gujarat and parts of North India uses similar sticks and has some commonalities with kolattam. Sometimes, long colored ribbons are used instead of sticks to dance. In the recent years, men are also involved in the dance and children often dance in school festivities.

=== Kolannalu ===
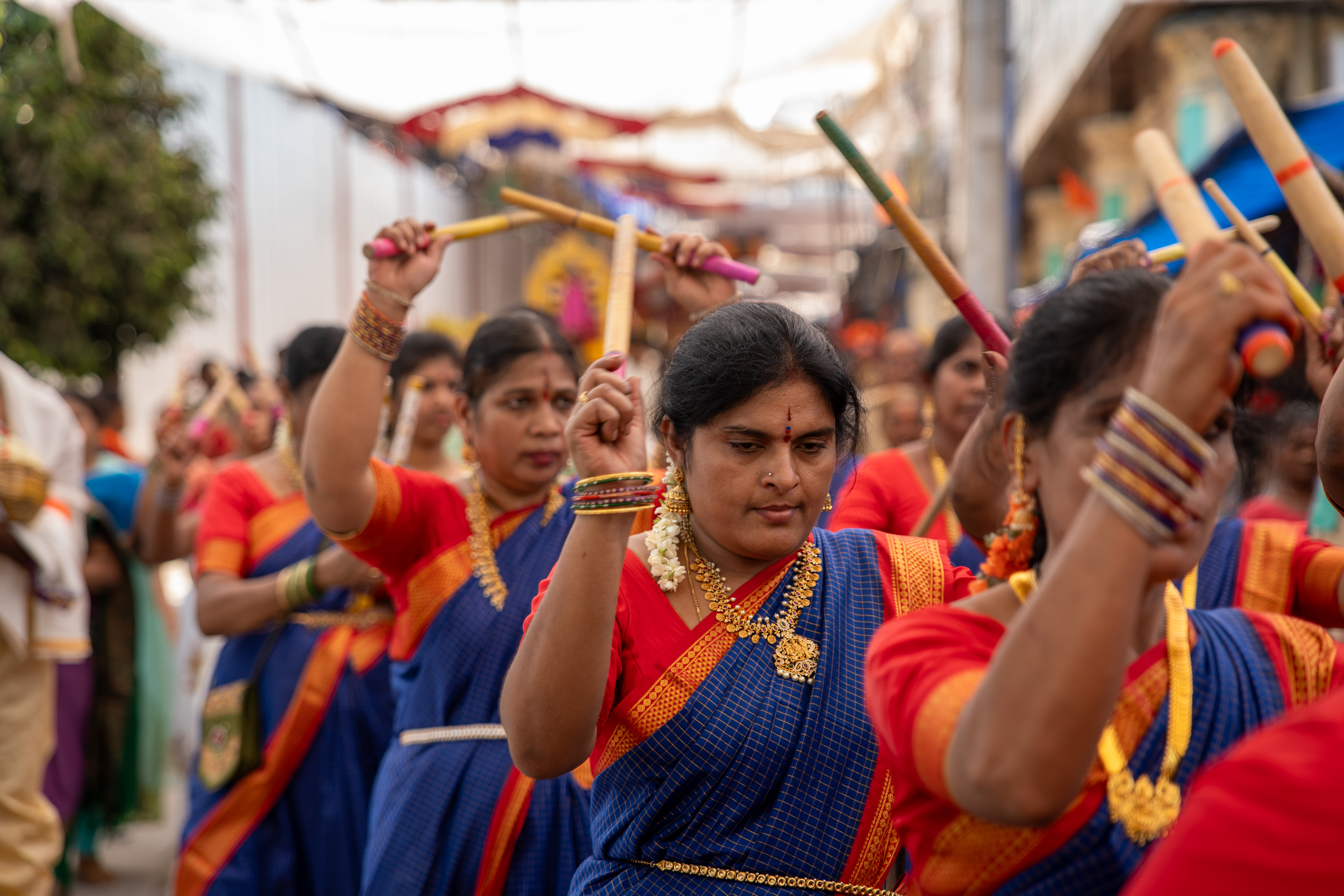
Women dancing at Bhadrachalam

A similar dance form practiced in Andhra Pradesh and Telangana is known as Kolannalu. It is a rural art usually performed during village festivals.

A Kolannalu group comprises dancers ranging from 8 to 40 who are grouped in pairs. The sticks provides the main rhythm. The dancers are led by a leader and move about in two circles. The inner circle receive the strikes on their sticks from the artists in the outer circle that deliver them. It is also called Kolanna in the Prakasam district of Andhra Pradesh.
