= Chhayam =

Traditional Khmer musical dance

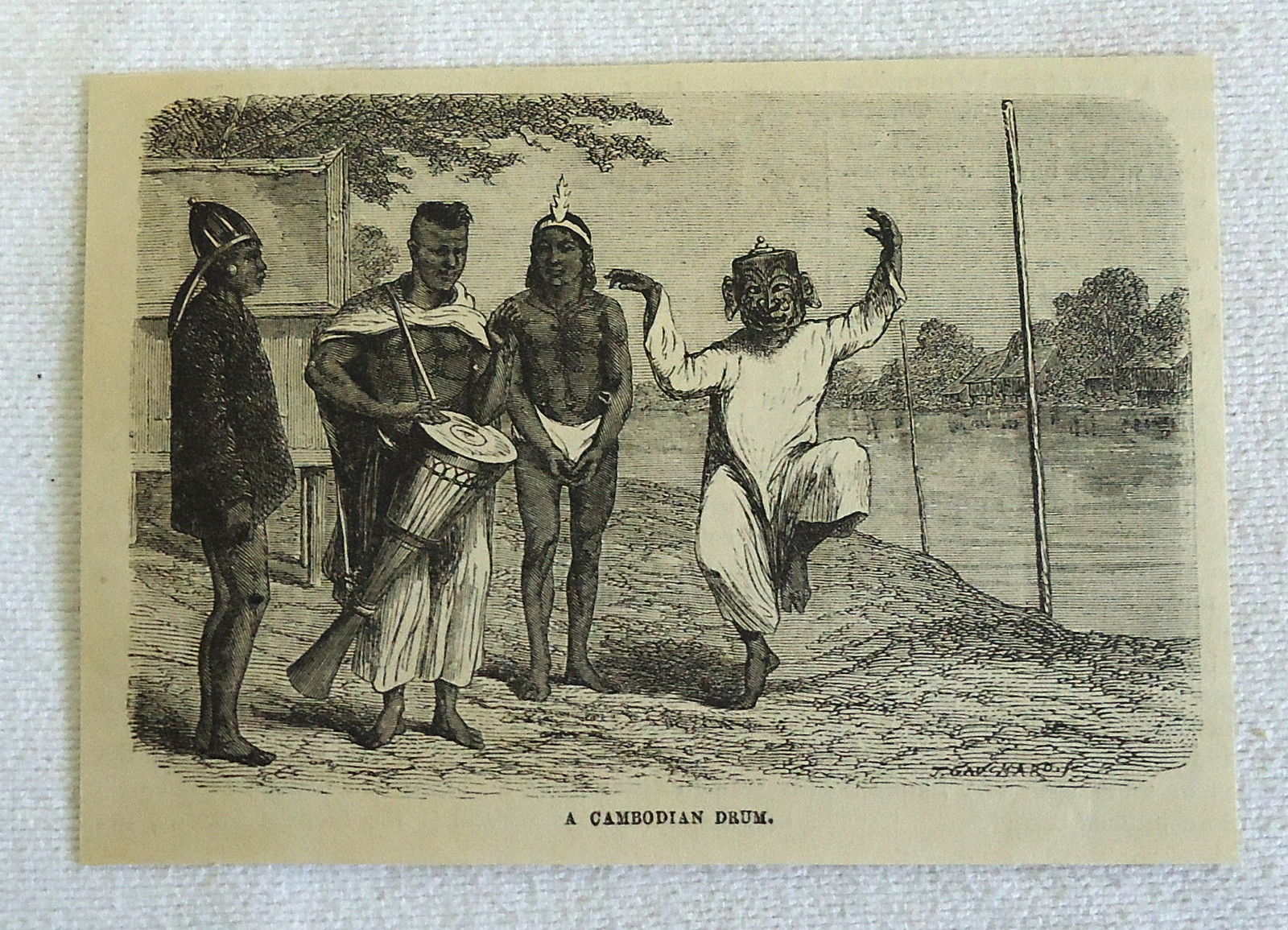
Instrument from 1892 engraving that resembles modern skor chhaiyam

Chhayam (Khmer: ឆៃយ៉ាំ) is a traditional Khmer musical dance. It is typically performed by a group of dancers in line or circle formation. Male dancers wear loose-fitting pants and shirts, while women dancers wear sampot. Both genders wear ornate jewelry and accessories.
