= Trot dance =

Trot
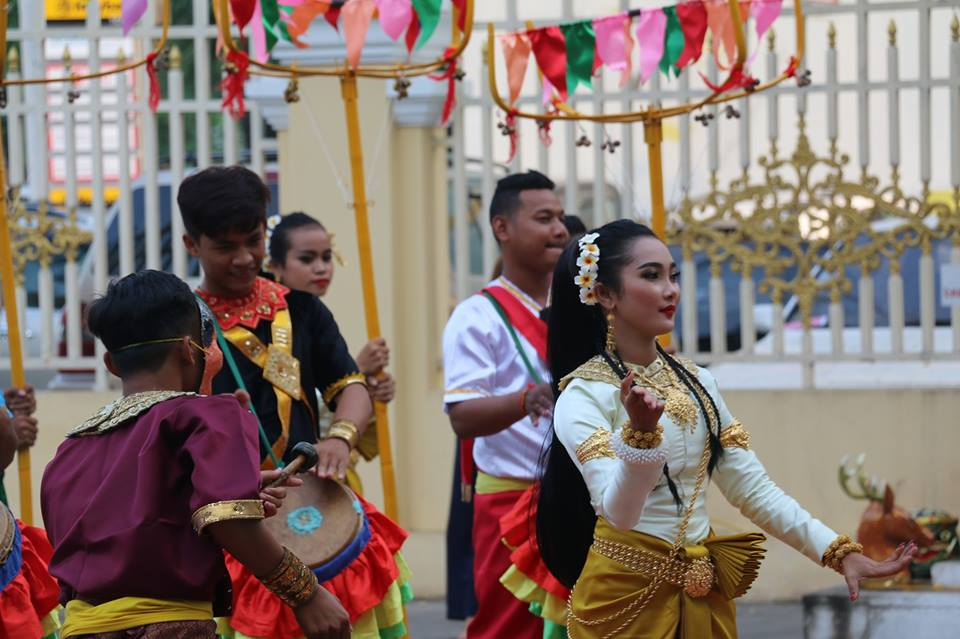
- Native name: របាំត្រុដិ
- Genre: Cambodian dance
- Time signature: 4/4
- Instrument(s): singers, a pair of percussion kancha, two drums skor day, a fiddle bicorde tro band three pairs of wooden tap-dances krap
- Origin: Cambodian

The Trot dance is the most popular Mon-Khmer traditional dance usually performed by groups during the Sangkran Khmer New Year festival.

It is the pantomime of a deer hunt imitating the beings which are called upon to be attracted to the human realm, one of the fundamental goals of the sacred dances of Cambodia.

== Etymology ==
Most sources accept that the word "trot" (ត្រុដិ) is derived from the Sanskrit word translated "cut off" or "cut off" referring to the end of the year as cutting off the old year into the new year. Thus, Its full name comes from the royal ceremony of the Cambodian New Year known as "Trot Sangkran" (ត្រស្តិសង្ក្រាន្ត).

== Origin ==
It is commonly believed that the trot dance has its origins in the Samre ethnic group, which lived with the Khmers in the ancient land of Suvarnabhumi or "Land of Gold" when it was not yet influenced by Indian civilization before the 1st century AD. There are two stories related to this traditional dance, one connecting to its royal origin, the other trying to baptize a pre-Indian dance into the Buddhist religious framework.

=== Royal narrative ===
According to the first royal narrative, a poor couple of fishermen named Bun and his wife Neang Oma, lived near Savathy district. They were poor people, always hunting for prey to make a living. One day, the husband prepared his bow and arrows to go out and hunt. The hunter wandered through the forest, crossing the river further and further, without encountering any prey, leading the hunter to think that maybe the gods kept them hidden from his view. Therefore, the hunter prayed to all the angels and powers of heaven for help.

After praying, the hunter continued his journey and suddenly encountered a majestic deer in a bright clairie. His hide was like golden threads and his antlers like glittering glass. The hunter was overjoyed, shot the deer down, and used a knife to cut off a piece of skin.

Arriving, seeing that the deer was very good, he brought the buckskin and antlers to the king who would be worthy of this great hunting trophy. King Brahma saw that the peity of the hunter and he was pleased, so he appointed Bun as the provincial governor. From that day on, a dance group told his story.

=== Buddhist narrative ===
The second story is situated as another Jataka tale. Before Buddha's enlightenment, he went out to perform vows. At that time, some evil spirit pretended to be a deer to block his way, preventing him from moving forward. The bodhisattva prayed and called on the good spirits. Suddenly, Brahma, Indra, and all the devas came down to snatch the deer, that died. All the devas then marched across the Anoma River to build a pagoda, fulfilling their wishes with the music of the festival waiting in the streets. This narrative is nowhere to be found in the Jataka tales, not even in the Paññāsa Jātaka, a collection of 50 non-canonical Jataka tales of Southeast Asia. However, it seems like it is a palimpsestic rewriting of the Syama Jataka: the deer is shot as Syama got shot with an arrow.

=== A national pride ===
The origin of the trot dance was once associated to Laotian mendicants who used it to beg for money. More often, it is associated to the Samre or Pear people, as the primitive people of Cambodia. It can also be a form of scapegoat, as any trot dance that would not be rightly performed would attract bad luck to the whole nation. Henri Marchal even considered this dance to be a remance of Indonesian origin. Today, it is considered a Khmer dance. While French ethnologist Éveline Porée-Maspero noted that since 1936, the procession had been abandoned in some villages of the province of Siem Reap, the effort led by Minister of Culture Chheng Phon contributed to the renewed popularity of the dance after it had been totally eradicated by the Khmer Rouge. It is today an object of national pride as one for all Cambodians.

== Description ==
The trot dance is a traveling dance procession representing the killing of a deer by two masked figures, along with more than a dozen characters including some who are assigned to take charge of the collection of money offerings for the representation.

=== Narrative: the deer sacrifice ===
According the French ethnologist Éveline Porée-Maspero, "the trot (...) is the walking representation of the killing of a deer by two masked characters, after it has been hunted down theatrically. In Siem Reap, troops from the different surrounding villages join the procession hunt. They then go to Angkor Wat, where they mime the drama as an offering to the Buddha, are blessed by the monks, and finish their trek on the banks of the Baray where the local Khmer people come to picnic on the last day of the New Year celebrations. [...] All the dancing troops from Siem Reap go dancing in Angkor Wat and then get blessed in the Southern Pagoda. According to the monk kru Ap of this pagoda, the troops must dance in front of the Buddhas of the central shrine of Angkor Wat, then come to the South pagoda to be sprinkled with holy water [...] If they do not fulfill this obligation, they will not avoid calamities in the new year. Once this little ceremony is done, they can return home without fear."

=== Actors: 16 artists ===
French ethnologist Éveline Porée-Maspero described the procession in Siem Reap in 1949 as such:

The composition of the troupes is, except for a few fantasies, always about the same. A man representing a deer straddles a curved stick, one end of which ends in a massacre of pros (Cervus aristotelis), the other in an imposing grassy tail from which a bell is usually hung. The deer's skull is sometimes covered with painted cardboard, where the eyes are underlined by the red and black seeds of the Abrus precatorius. These seeds also underline the eyes, eyebrows, and lips of the masks of the two dancers charged with killing the deer, which they do with wooden rifles after miming the deer's stalking and being chased by the beast. In addition to these figures, we see one or two dancers whose hands are lengthened by a kind of fake nails made of small braided rattan fingers whose long tips end in a red cotton pompom. The troupe that I saw in 1949 in Wat Athvea, one of these dancers was equipped with two brooms of dry grass which he played very gracefully during his evolutions. A seeker holds a long curved pole at its end, with a cloth purse hanging at the base of the curve. The orchestra consists of four or five kancha players, a player of a flute (oboe) called a pei, a player of skor arak, and two ringing stick bearers. It is sometimes supplemented by a two-stringed violin.

The number of artists participating in a trot dance varies depending on people's wishes, but there are generally 16, including four main dancers, two women and two men, a deer representing the forces of evil, a "Dangdol" (person carrying a musical instrument), four "Kanhche" (person clowning here and there), two giants, two monsters, two drummers, a hunter and a few others.

In the procession, one of the trotters is specially charged, while dancing of "fishing" with a chhneang (a woven basket used as a sieve to collect small fish hidden in the grasses of streams or ponds), in practise collecting the money thrown by the spectators. While traditionally, the Trot procession dance would go begging from one house to the other, today groups are hired by schools and institutions such as pagodas, ministries or city halls to perform the dance, with the price varying from $50 to $100 or up to $200 depending on the place and guests. The traditional dance is also popular among the community of Cambodians of Chinese descent, who often have booked performances.

== Interpretation ==
=== A royal dance ===
In the past, the trot dance was performed every New Year in front of kings and royal families to wish them a happy new year. The royal language used in the lyrics of the Siem Reap trot dance is also evidence of its origin. From the royal court of Angkor, where it is still observed with more pomp and circumstance, the trot dance was folklorized as it became a popular rite of the Khmer New Year across the country.

=== Chasing the bad luck of the past year, wishing good for the new ===
Performing the trot dance is commonly understood as a way to get rid of the bad and increase good fortune for the upcoming New Year, according to traditional beliefs. It can therefore be compared to the Chinese Dragon Dance which is also presumed to ward off the bad spirits of the past year. According to Henri Marchal, the royal dance was already some form of apotropaic rite to get any bad luck far away from the king.

=== A propitiatory rite ===
The dance and the deer sacrifice may also represent a propitiatory rite imploring for the rain to fall again at the end of the dry season. According to a 1949 report by Reverend Iv Tuot for the Commission des Moeurs et Coutumes du Cambodge, the trot dance was already acknowledged as a ceremony imploring rain. Along with the rain, the dance and the suggestive dances of actors in couple is also a plea for fertility as the end of the season before the first rainfall, which is usually also the time of rut.
