= Dance in Cambodia =

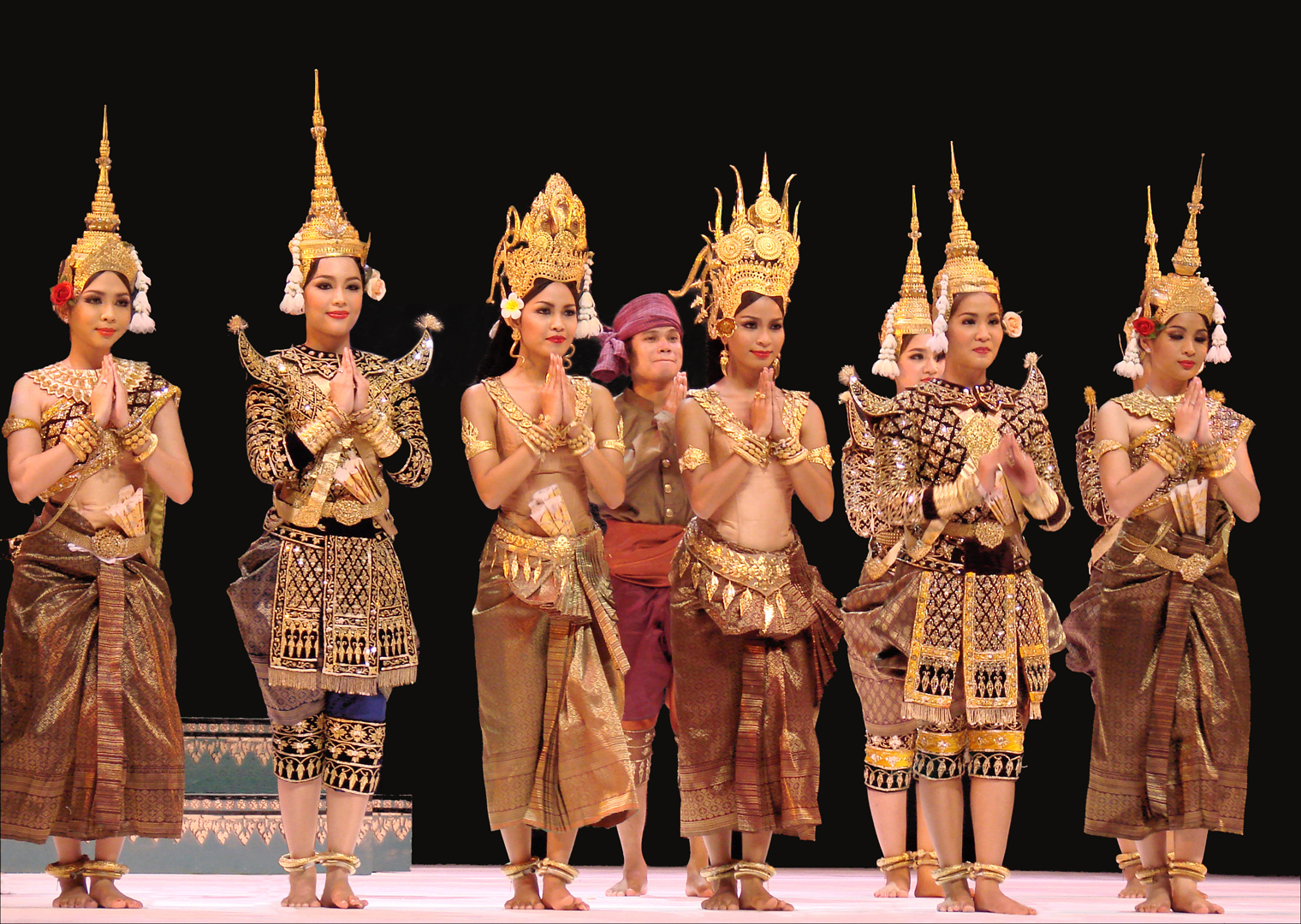
Khmer classical dance

Dance in Cambodia (Khmer: របាំ robam) consists of three main categories: classical dance of the royal court, folk dance which portrays cultural traditions, and social dances performed in social gatherings.

== Classical dance ==
Cambodia's premier performing art form is Khmer classical dance, or Robam Preah Reach Trop, a highly stylized dance form originating from the royal courts. Originally performed and maintained by attendants of the royal palaces, Khmer classical dance was introduced to the general public in the mid-20th century and became widely celebrated as iconic of Cambodian culture, often performed during public events, holidays, and for tourists visiting Cambodia.

Performances feature elaborately costumed dancers performing slow and figurative gestures to the musical accompaniment of a pinpeat ensemble. The classical repertoire includes dances of tribute or invocation and the enactment of traditional stories and epic poems such as the Ramayana. Two of the most performed classical dances are the Robam Chuon Por ("Wishing dance") and the Robam Tep Apsara ("Apsara dance").

Other names for Khmer classical dance include "Cambodian court dance" and "the royal ballet of Cambodia", although the latter term can also refer to the National Dance Company of Cambodia. In Khmer, it is formally known as Robam Preah Reach Trop (របាំព្រះរាជទ្រព្យ, lit. "dances of royal wealth") or Lakhon Preah Reach Trop (ល្ខោនព្រះរាជទ្រព្យ, lit. "theatre of royal wealth"). It is also sometimes called Lakhon Luong (ល្ខោនហ្លួង, lit. "the king's theatre"). During the Lon Nol regime of Cambodia, the dance tradition was referred to as Lakhon Kbach Boran Khmer (ល្ខោនក្បាច់បូរាណខ្មែរ, lit. "Khmer theatre of the ancient style"), a term that distanced it from its royal legacy.

=== List of classical dances ===
- Reamker (Ramayana)
- Robam Apsara (Apsara Dance)
- Robam Tep Monorom (Dance of Heavenly Bliss)
- Robam Preah Thong Neang Neak
- Robam Chuon Por (Wishing Dance)
- Robam Neang Sovannmaccha
- Robam Moni Mekhala
- Robam Khun Luong
- Robam Phlet (Fan Dance)
- Robam Makor
- Robam Yike
- Robam Ayai Chlay Chlong
- Robam Buong Suong (Prayer Dance)
- Robam Monosenchetna (Sentimental Dance)
- Robam Preah Chenovong Neang Preah Kesor
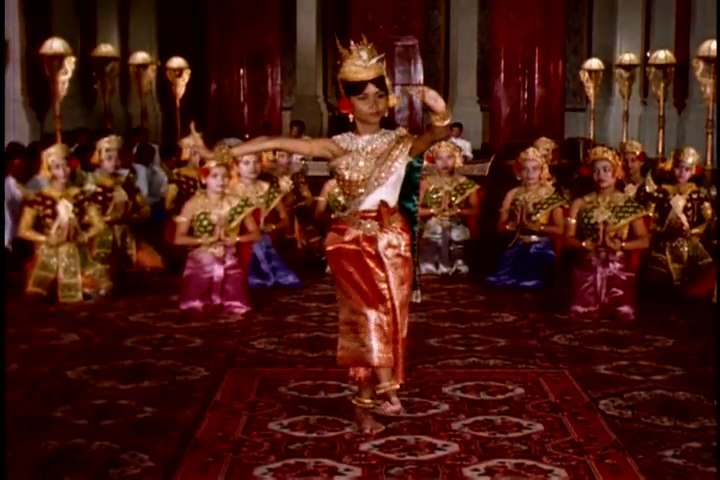
Robam Chuon Por

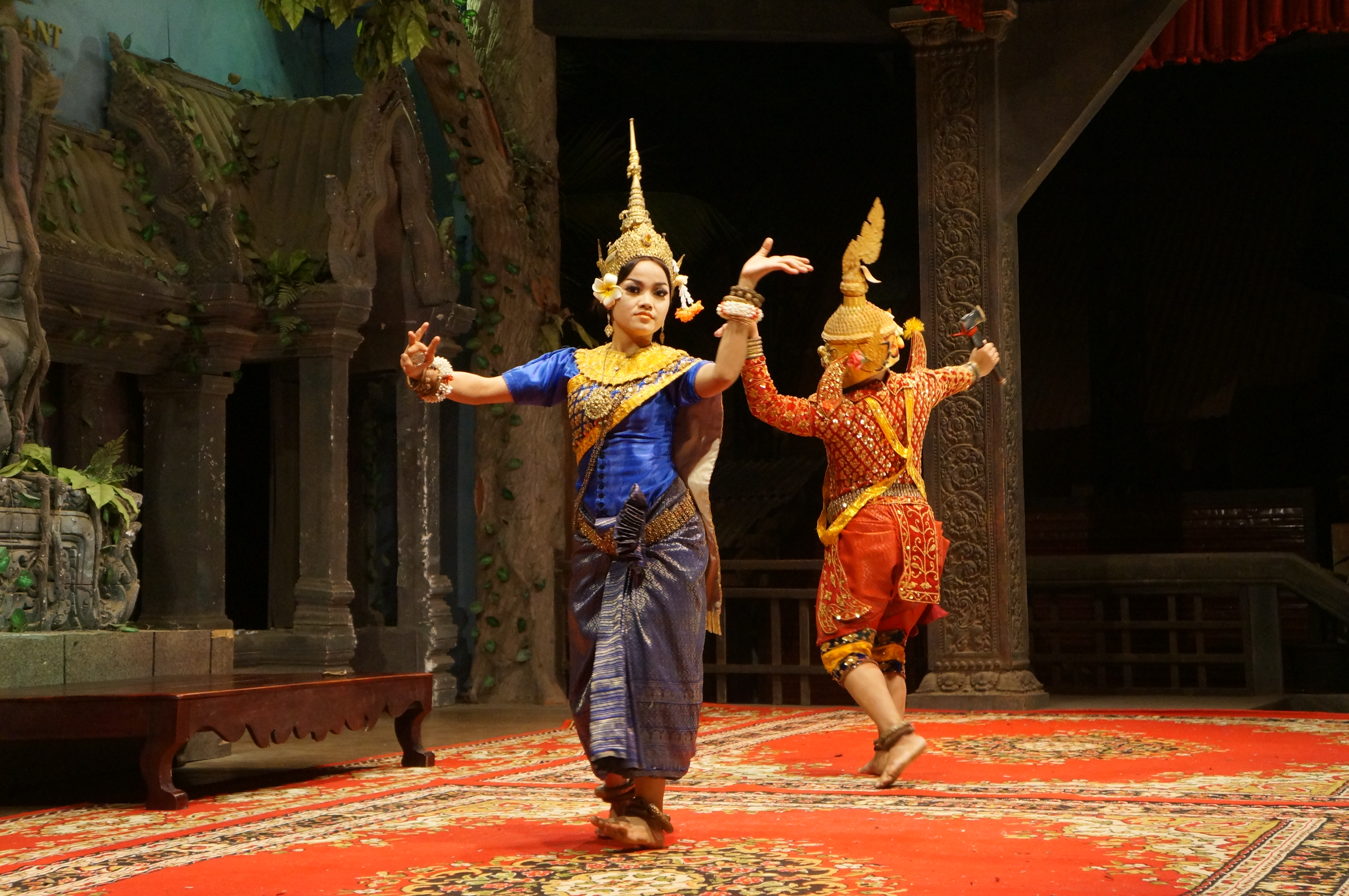
Robam Moni Mekhala

== Folk dance ==
Created in the 20th century are folk dances that emphasize that various cultural traditions and ethnic groups of Cambodia. Cambodian folk dances are usually more fast-paced than classical dances. The movements and gestures are not as stylized as classical dance. Folk dancers wear clothes of the people they are portraying such as Chams people, highlands ethnic minorities, farmers, and peasants. Some folk dances are about love or folktales. Most of the music of folk dances is played by a mahori orchestra.

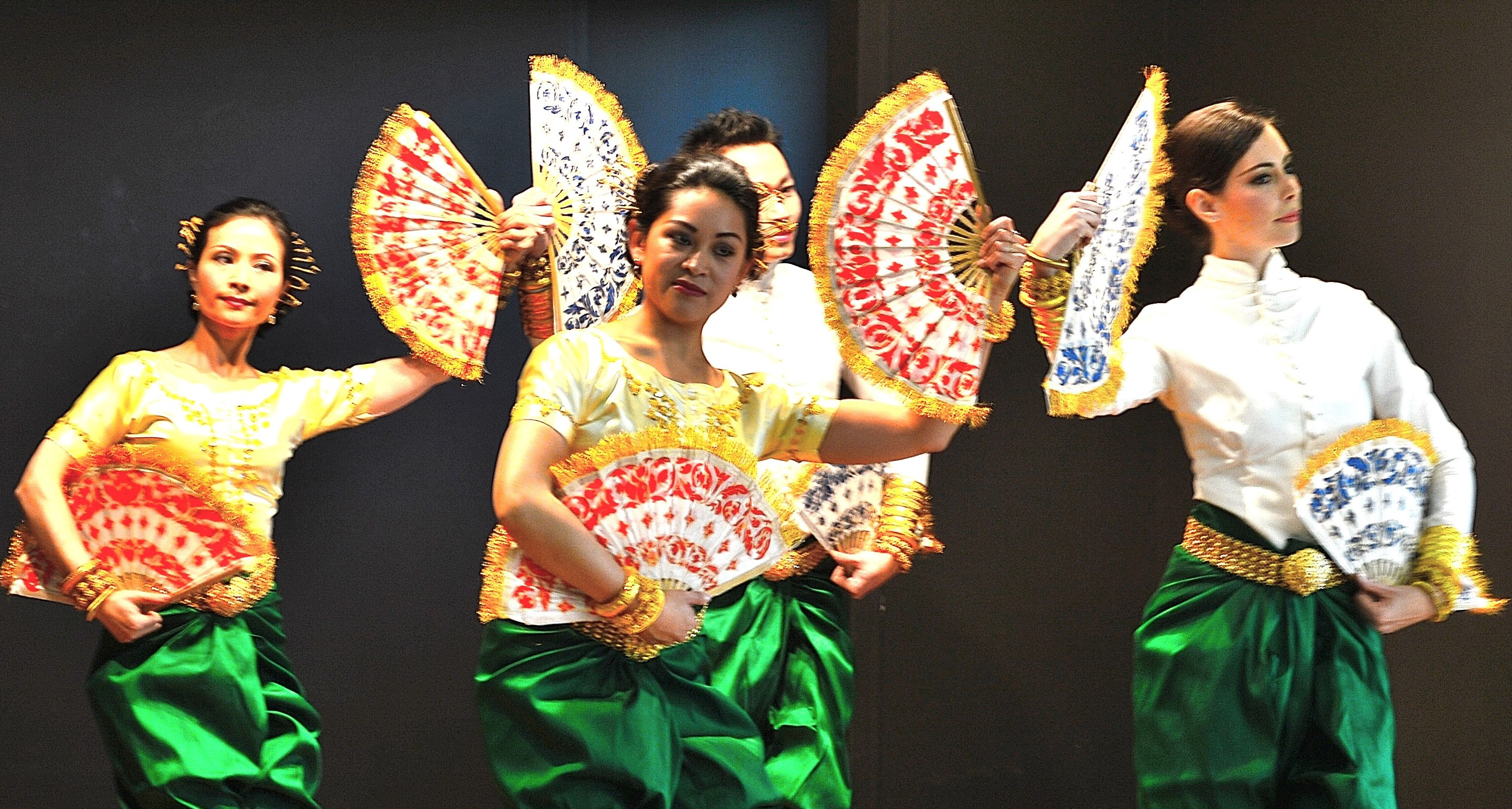
Robam Phlet (Fan dance)

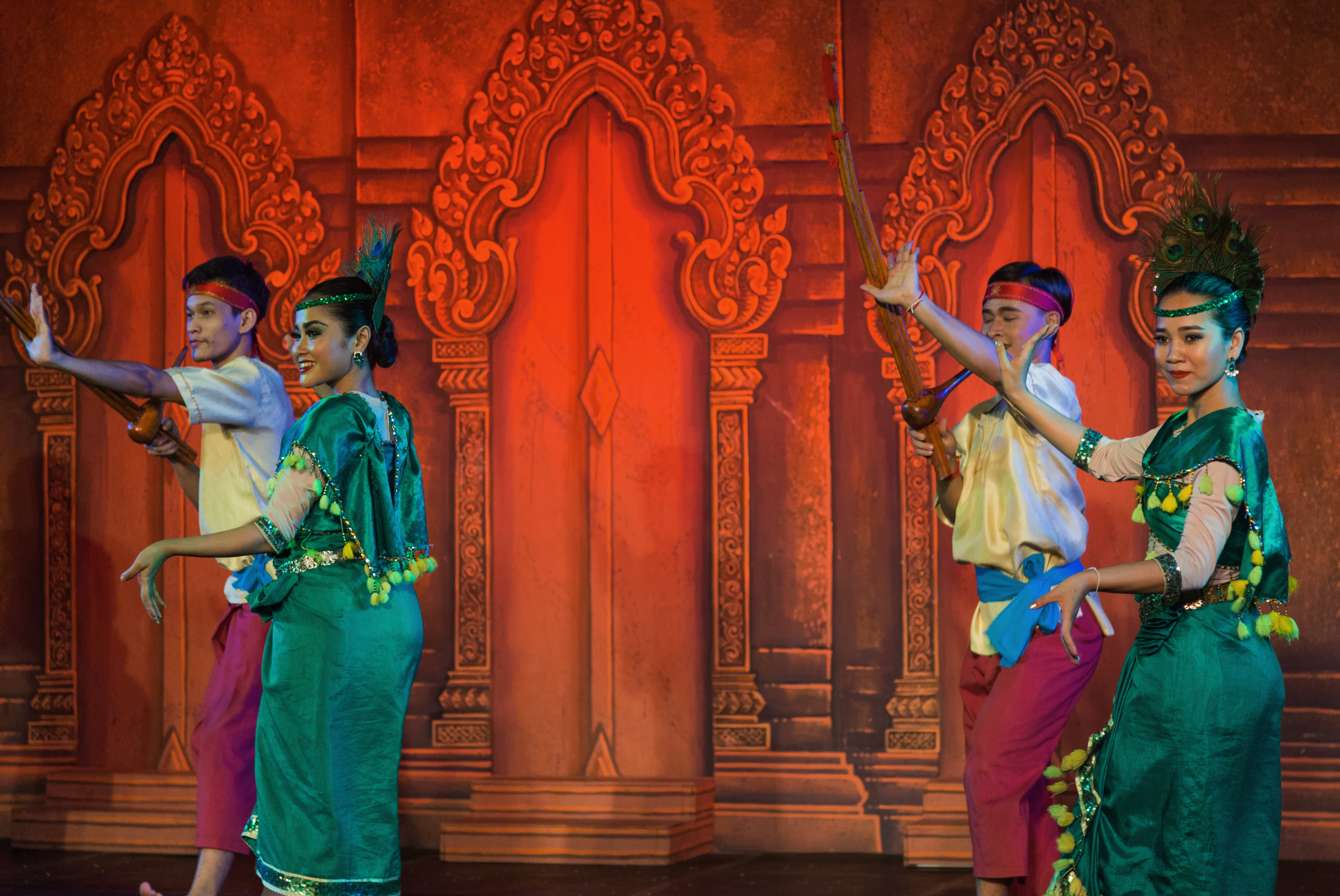
Robam Phloy Suoy (Ethnic Suoy "Phloy" instrument dance)

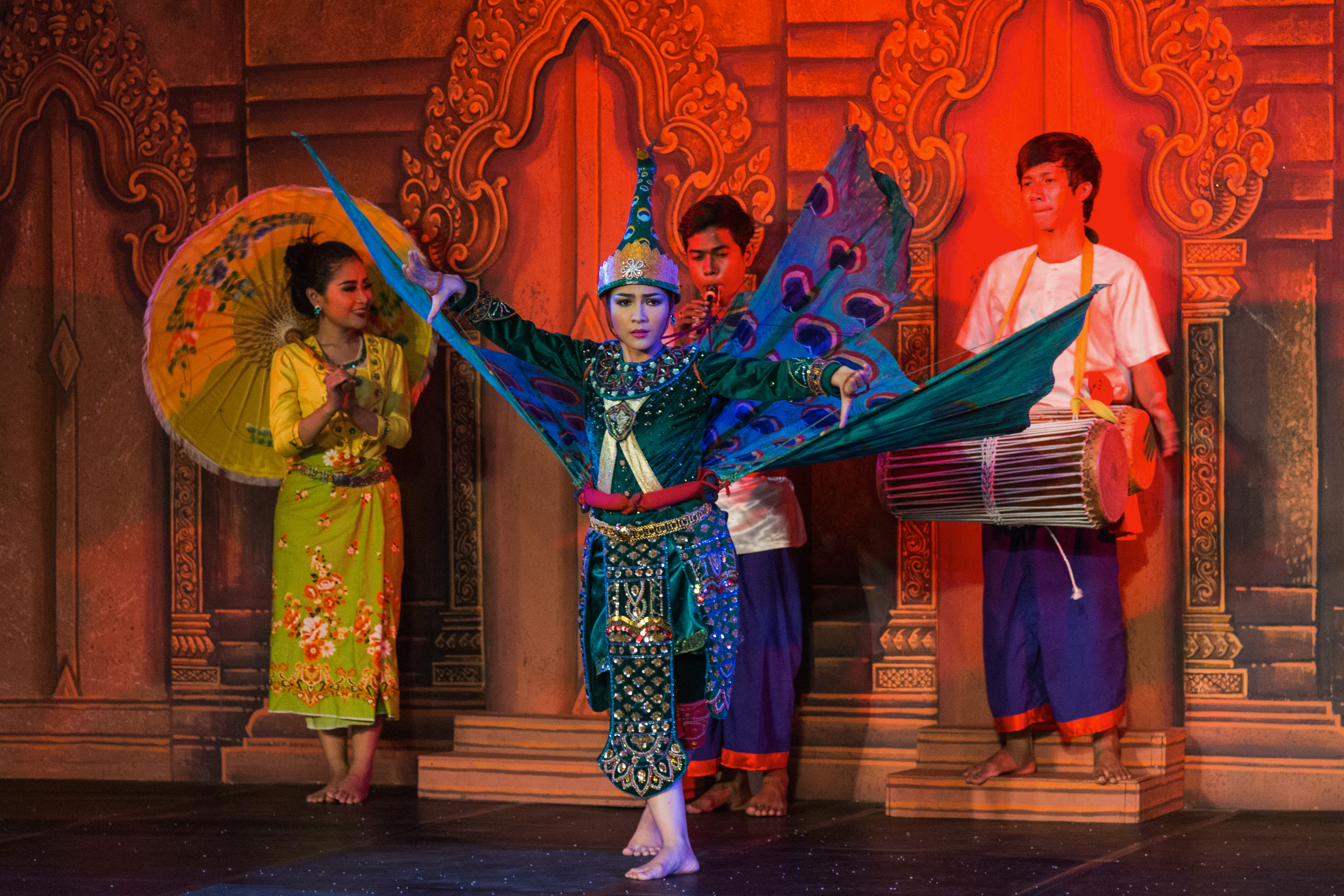
Robam Kngaok Pailin (Pailin peacock dance from the Kula minority)

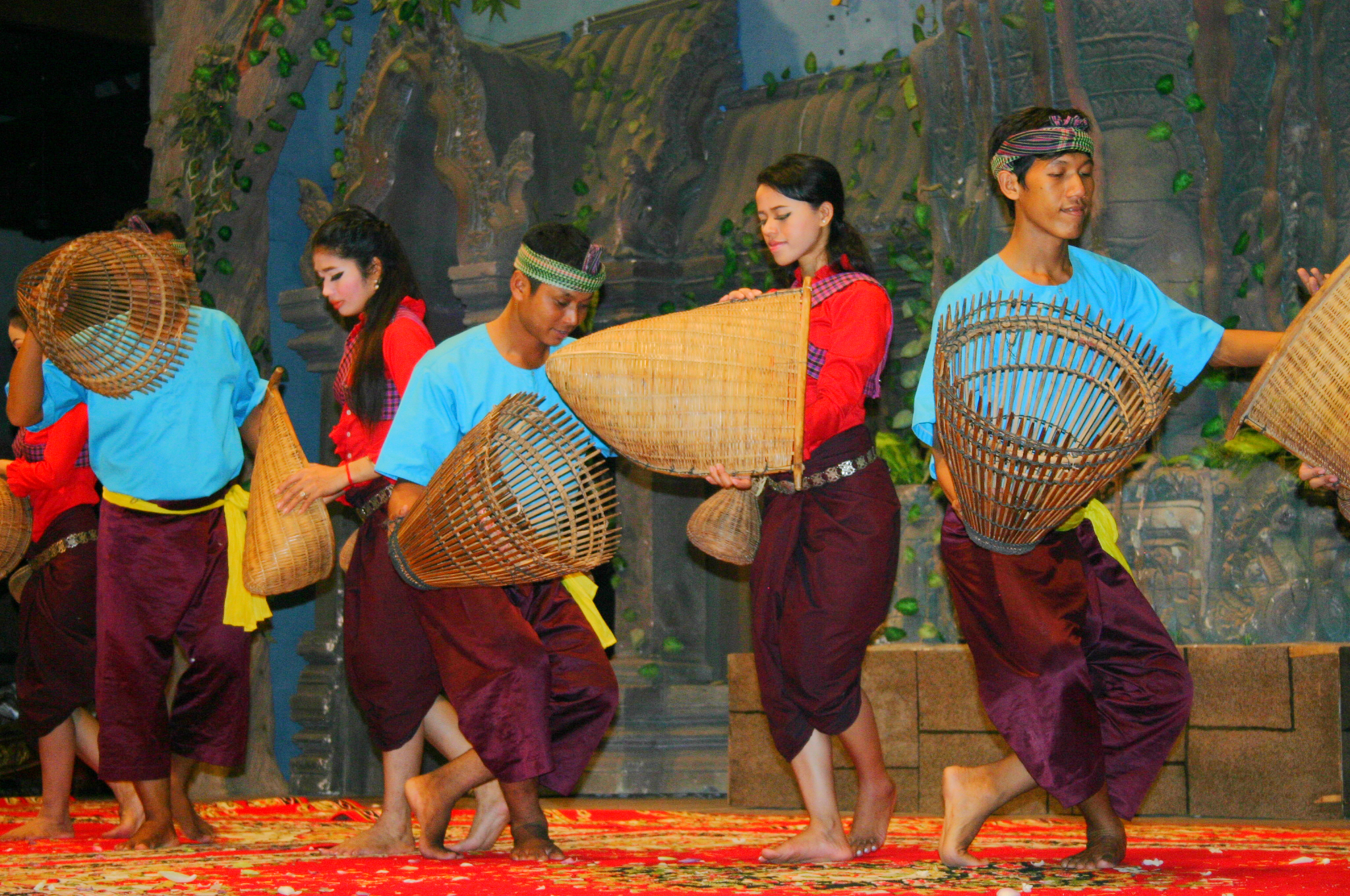
Robam Nesat (Cambodian Fishing Dance)

=== Selected list of folk dances ===
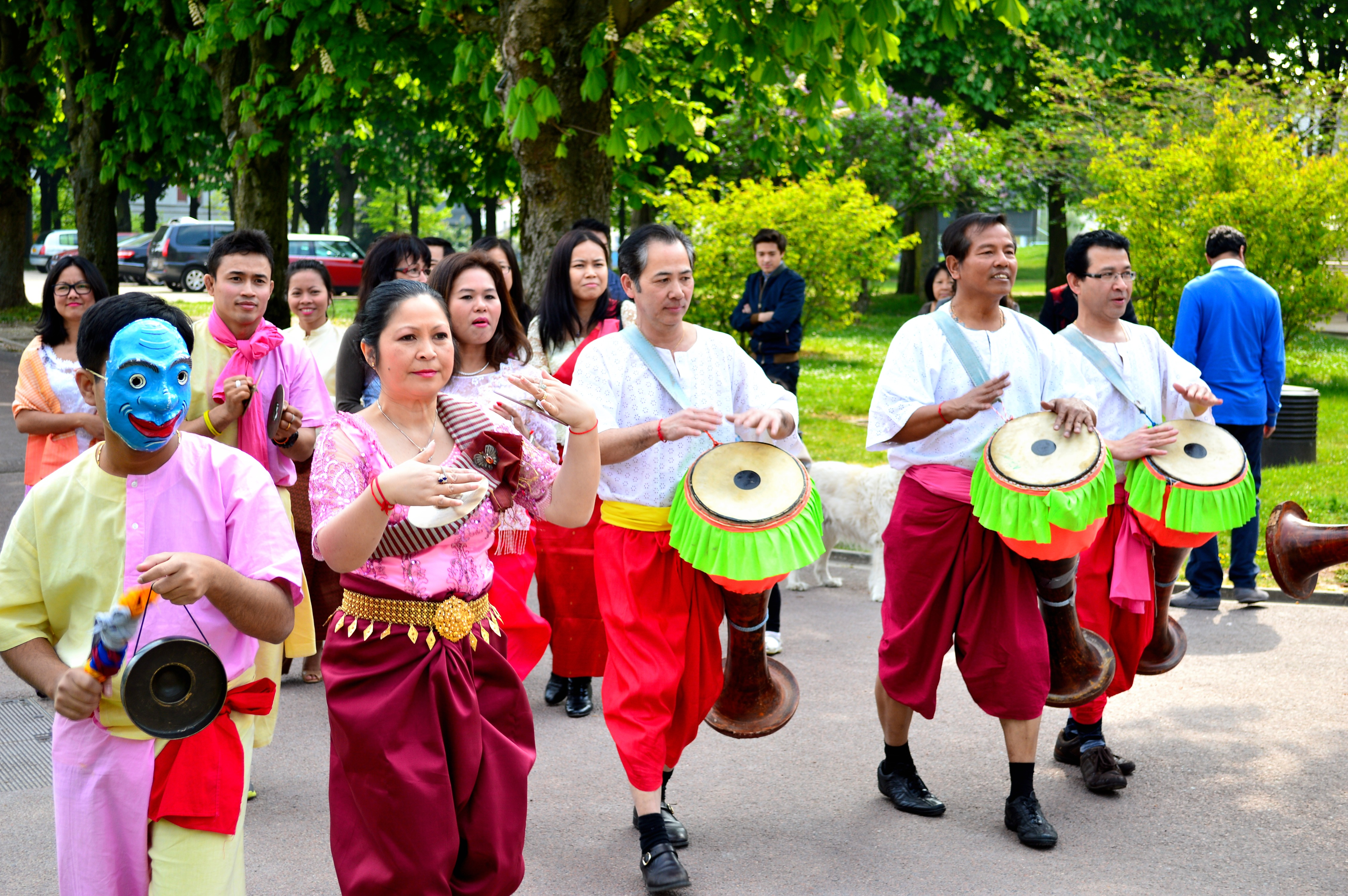
Cambodian New Year dance

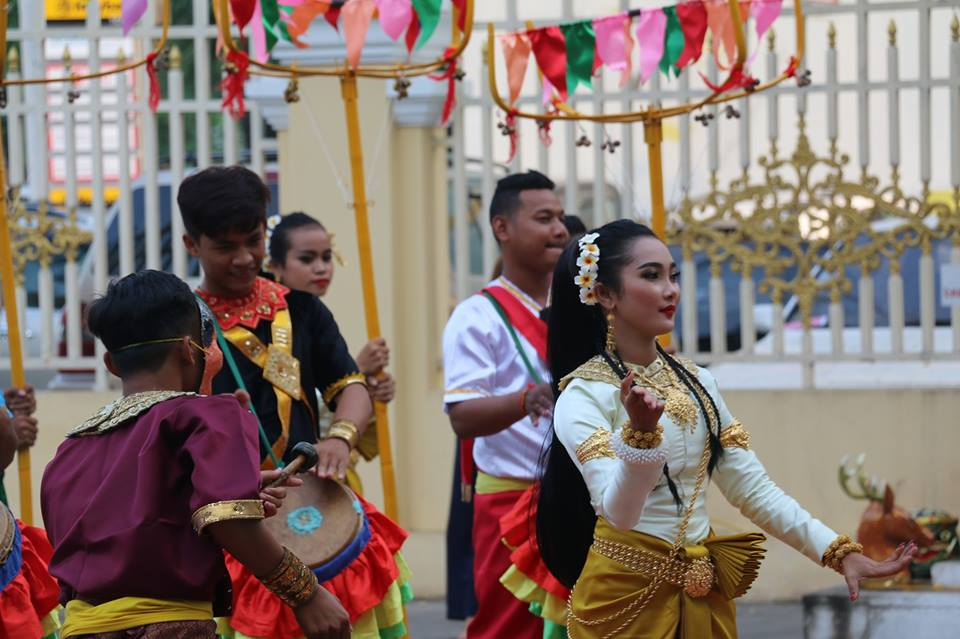
Trot Dance

- Trot dance (Dance of the Stag) - a popular dance representing a tale of a hunter and a deer who spread several danger between giant to ogress and peacock. It is performed to ward off evil and bad luck.
- Sneang Tosoang Dance (Dance of the Wild Oxen) - a dance around a tiger, a peacock, a deer, and other animals. The dance originates in Phnum Kravanh District, Pursat Province and depicts the Pear people.
- Robam Kom Araek - a dance mainly used two or three bamboo pole which hitting every second. It is reported that the dance came from Kuy people but it is more believed that the birthplace is Philippines during the reign of King Norodom (1834–1904) when he was traveling in Philippines.
- Robam Neary Chea Chuor (Khmer: របាំនារីជាជួរ) - is a traditional Khmer dance of young Cambodian women wearing colorful and elegant costumes. The dance reminds the Khmer people of the rich culture that has been nourished through generations, and it is well known among the neighboring countries of South-East Asia
- Robam Kngaok Pailin (Pailin peacock dance) - a dance portraying the Kula people in Pailin and their amusement with a pair of peafowl.
- Chhayam - a well known entertainment dance about pleasure, including several comedic roles and beautiful girls. The dance is performed at holidays and is a pure Khmer dance.
- Cambodian Coconut Dance - a dance performance involving coconuts with male and female dancers. Men wear a yellow shirt and dark red "Changkibin". Women wear a button up shirt and a green silk "Chong Kben". The dance originated around 1960 from Romeas Haek District in Svay Rieng Province.
- Cambodian Fishing Dance - a dance performance involving fishing that was composed in the 1960s at the Royal University of Fine Arts in Phnom Penh. It involves male dancers and female dancers.

== Social dance ==
Social dances commonly danced at social gatherings in Cambodia include the romvong, rom kbach, saravann, chok krapeus and lam leav. Other social dances from around the world have influenced Cambodian social culture, including the cha-cha, the bolero, and the Madison. Such dances are often performed at Cambodian banquet parties.

== See also ==
- Theatre of Cambodia
- Norodom Buppha Devi
- Dance of Indonesia
- Balinese dance
- Javanese dance

== Sources ==
- Lytle, Tiffany (2023-04-13). "Is My Body My Own?". Conversations Across the Field of Dance Studies. 42. doi:10.3998/conversations.3657. ISSN 2834-6823.
