= Dandiya Raas =

Gujarati socio-religious folk dance

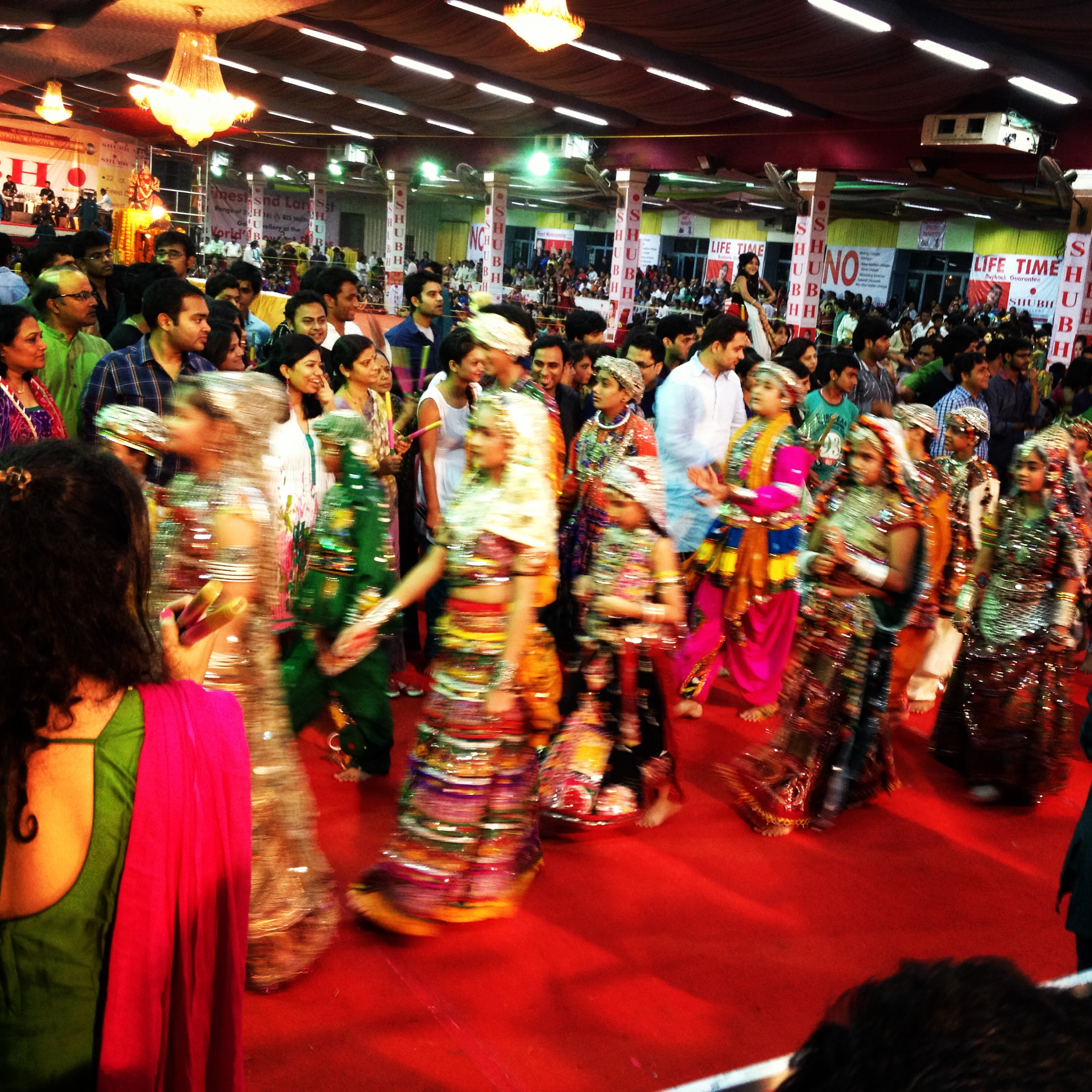
Dandiya Raas dance by children during Navratri in Bangalore

Raas or Dandiya Raas is the socio-religious folk dance originating from Indian states of Gujarat and Rajasthan during the period where the states were unified under the Gurjara empire, it was and is performed in Sharad Navratri, Janmashtami fairs, and weddings natively in both regions.

Dandiya-raas exists in different forms, including the collegiate competitive form. The dance style is now in a competitive format and a traditional format.

== Etymology ==
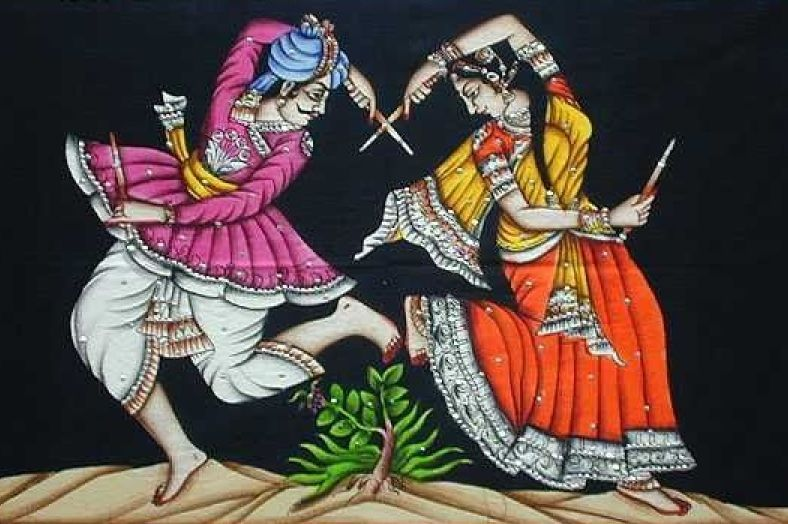
Dandiya

The word "Dandiya" means a pair of wooden sticks, used to mark time. The word "Raas" comes from the Sanskrit word "Rasa", an aesthetic Indian concept related to emotions and feelings. Kapila Vatsyayan argued that the aesthetic theory of the Rasa gives the underlying unity to the Indian arts.

== Religious Significance ==
In Navratri celebrations, Dandiya Raas is the dance form representation of the battle between the goddess Durga and the demon Mahishasura. The pair of dandiyas held by each dancer represents the swords of Durga, and the rythmic clattering of sticks mimics the clash of swords.

== Dance style ==
Men and women traditionally play dandiya-raas and the dance operates in pairs, meaning the group must contain an even number. Generally, two lines are formed, with partners facing each other:

The lines move clockwise, and each person steps forward to hit sticks with their partner, then moves on two people. At the end of the line, each turns and joins the line opposite, so the movement is continuous. The music starts very slowly […] It is an eight-beat time cycle called Kaherva and performed in the following manner: on the first beat, your own sticks are hit together, followed by right sticks with your partner, then left sticks (or the same stick if using one). Each one then turns away to the left to hit their own sticks together before turning back to the partner to hit the right sticks again, and before moving on two places to a new partner.

== Forms ==
Dandiya Raas, Gopgunthan Solanga Raas and Mer Dandiya Raas are the popular forms of Raas. In Saurashtra, Raas is performed by the men and the dance performed by women is called as Raasda. Element of dance is more prominent in the Raas while music is more prominent in Raasda.

== Competitions ==
=== Collegiate Garba-Raas ===
Garba-Raas, more commonly known as Raas, is a combination dance style consisting of mainly Dandiya-Raas and some Garba. Garba-Raas emerged as a competitive dance style due to the efforts of the Federation of Gujarati Associations of North America (FOGNA). The Garba-Raas competitive dance style was further developed in the early 2000s by first generation Indian-American college students. Furthermore, a cohesive national organization for Garba-Raas was established in 2009 called Raas All-stars (RAS). As of 2023, the organization consists of almost 50 actively competing collegiate Garba-Raas teams nationwide, out of a total of 66 recorded teams.

=== Competitive Garba-Raas ===
Garba-Raas is traditionally a recreational social dance form that is done in large groups. The competitive form is described as "...competitive sport, rather than an inclusive, ritualistic dance form, the need to "entertain" has become increasingly paramount" by Falcone. In order to turn this social dance into a competitive activity, many aspects of the dance, such as the formations, the moves, and structures, have changed. The new evolved style is described in further detail below under " The Garba-Raas Competitive Dance Style".

Similarities between the traditional and competitive styles are the clothing, the music, and the basic moves. Jessica Falcone points out that dancers prefer to identify the new dance style as a branch of Garba and Dandiya-raas but in reality, she states that intercollegiate Garba-Raas is transforming into its own dance style.

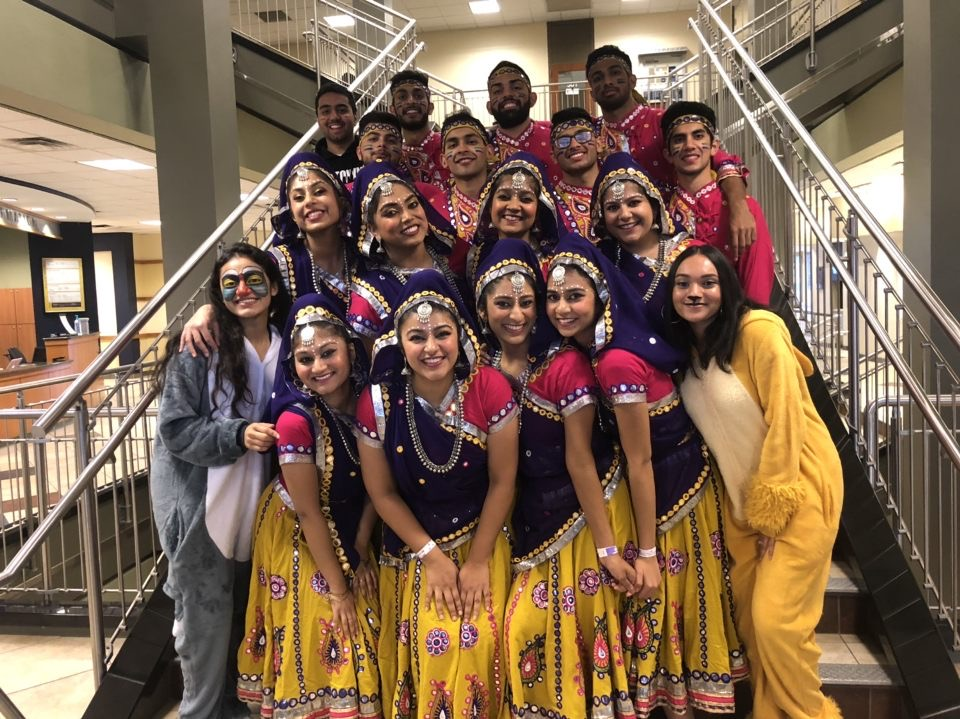
Collegiate Garba-Raas Team in Traditional Clothing

The structure competition dance consists of 12-16 dancers who perform 8-9 continuous dances which are a combination of Garba, dandiya-raas, and tran tali. All dancers are required to be college students but may attend a different college from which they represent. Teams are expected to be in traditional Garba-Raas clothing. Routines are commonly constructed with a theme presented throughout the dance through props and special effects. On stage the dance is described as "very intense and high-energy: (1) the music is usually at a faster tempo than the other forms of Garba-Raas discussed previously, (2) dancers are taught a form of fast head-bobbing, (3) manic smiles are pasted on each dancer in order to emphasize enthusiasm to judges".

Male and female students typically perform competitive Garba-raas with 12-16 dancers on stage at a time and always in even numbers if possible, even though the routine itself is not completely based on partner interactions. Dancers take up an entire auditorium stage with different types of formations and movements throughout an approximately six-minute dance piece. Throughout the piece, dancers either do choreography facing the audience or interact with other partners on stage for short periods of time in a reference to the traditional roots of Garba-raas. Unlike traditional dandiya-raas or Garba, collegiate Garba-raas do not have a set centre focal point.

==== Raas All-Stars ====
Raas All-Stars (RAS) is the national organization under which the collegiate Garba-Raas competitions and teams function. RAS was established in 2009. They are responsible for certifying eligible competitions and hosting the national championship at the end of each season.

===== Structure =====
The competition season for Garba-Raas takes place at the beginning of each calendar year (January to April). In order to compete under the RAS organization, teams must submit applications to the certified competitions, known as Bid Competitions, by a set deadline. The application commonly includes an audition video of the team displaying a dance to three songs. Eight teams are then selected and invited to compete by the board of each individual competition. Each competition awards the top three teams, 1st, 2nd, and 3rd place with 4 bid points, 2 bid points, and 1 bid point, respectively. The 8 teams with the highest cumulative bid point total are invited to the national RAS competition.

===== Judging =====
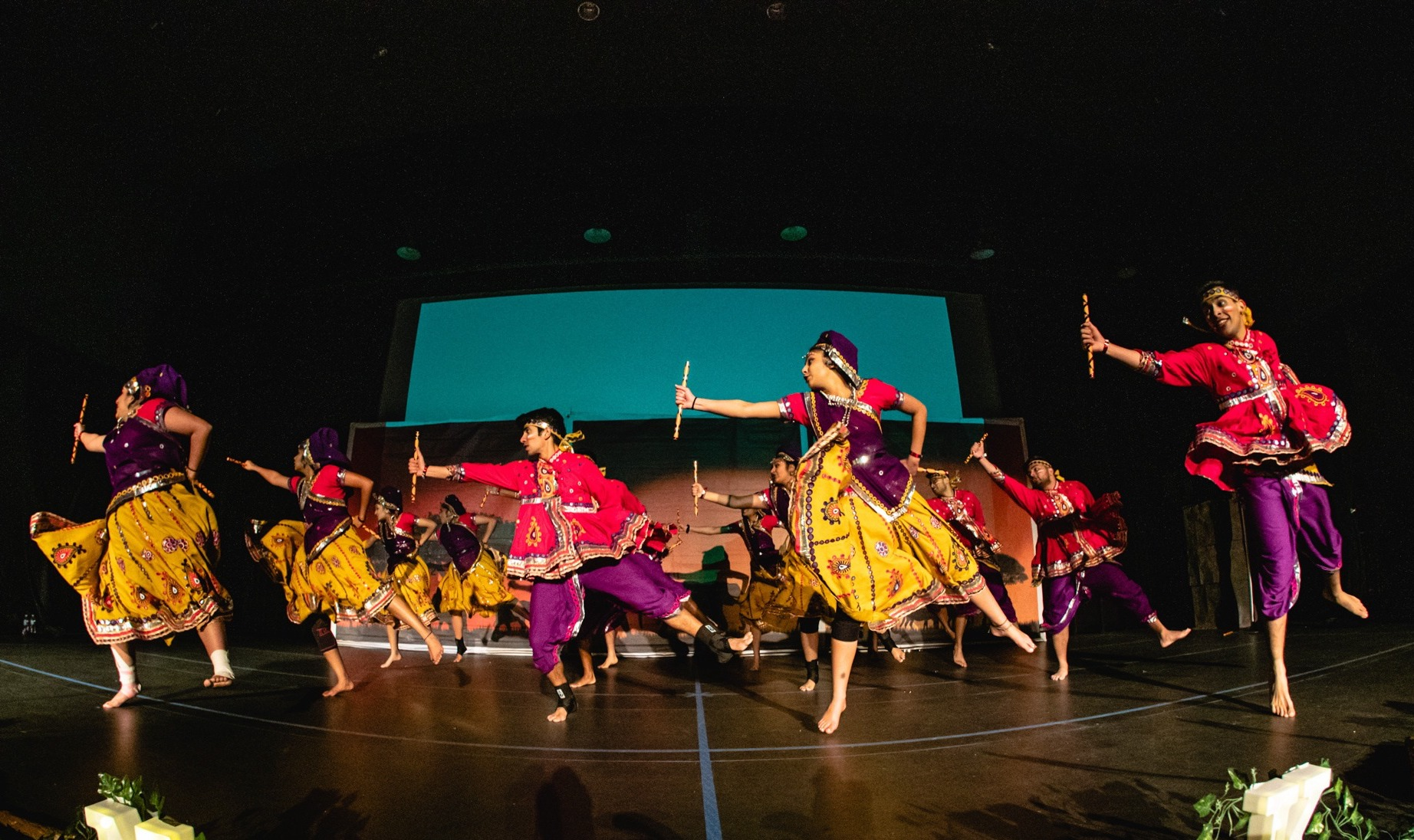
Collegiate Garba-Raas Team Performing for National-Level Competition

Garba-Raas performances are judged on three elements: Artistic Elements, Choreography and Execution. Bid competitions are required to have at minimum five judges (two Choreography, two Execution and one Artistic Element) but ideally have more than one judge per category, with the highest number of judges being nine per panel (three per category). All three elements are judged on their respective "WOW" factors (term coined by the rubric), and team captains receive comments on their team's performances from the judges after every team has competed and been ranked.

During the competition itself, there are strict guidelines the judges must follow: "During the show, the judges will sit separately to avoid any discussion of performances. This means that judges from the same category cannot sit next to each other. (For example, choreography and execution may be next to each other, but two choreography judges must be sitting separately.) The judges will also avoid any use of electronic devices, such as cell phones or laptops. During competing performances, the judges will score teams using the Raas All-Stars judging rubric. The judges may consider writing any qualitative notes on scratch paper for use in deliberation." Judging rubrics for all RAS Bid Competitions are created and curated by the Executive Board of Raas All-Stars. All three rubrics are standardized each year so that judging criteria across all competitions and teams are consistent.

====== Criteria ======
Artistic elements include many elements of the performance that do not involve choreography, but are crucial nonetheless and ranked by judges using a rubric standardized by the RAS organization. "As the regulatory body, RAS creates and executes the criteria for choosing and judging these competitions". The theme of the competing team's performance is assessed, including the creativity of the theme and the execution in regards to the set, props and various gimmicks a team may perform. The rubric includes prompts such as: "Does the theme incorporation seem to naturally fit with the team's performance without taking away from the dance or does it seem forced?" Additionally, music is assessed regarding its tempo, rhythm and appeal within the performance. Historically, thematic judging is more nuanced than other elements because of personal opinions a judge or elder members of the Garba-Raas community may have.

Choreography is judged via a similar rubric, however the judges for this element are required to have significant experience and are vetted properly by the RAS Executive Board prior to being given the position. A team's choreography is judged by the opening and closing sequences, formations, originality, musicality, proximity to traditional Garba-Raas, complexity, structure and pacing. Execution is judged by a third rubric, which includes categories such as recovery, synchronization, transitions, energy, grace and overall impression.
