= Greek dances =

Dances traditionally performed in Greece

Greek dance (choros; Greek: χορός, romanized: chorós) is an old tradition, being referred to by authors such as Plato, Aristotle, Plutarch and Lucian. There are different styles and interpretations from all of the islands and surrounding mainland areas. Each region formed its own choreography and style to fit in with their own ways. For example, island dances have more of a different smooth flow to them, while Pontic dancing closer to the Black Sea, is very sharp. There are over 10,000 traditional dances that come from all regions of Greece. There are also pan-Hellenic dances, which have been adopted throughout the Greek world. These include specifically the Syrtos, Kalamatianos, Pyrrhichios, Ballos, Zeibekiko, and hasapiko.

Traditional Greek dancing has a primarily social function. It brings the community together at key points of the year, such as Easter, the grape harvest or patronal festivals; and at key points in the lives of individuals and families, such as weddings. For this reason, tradition frequently dictates a strict order in the arrangement of the dancers, for example, by age.

A study conducted on children engaging in a dance program involving the performance of various types of traditional Greek dances has demonstrated that it is an effective exercise for strengthening young children's static and dynamic balance.

Greek dances are performed also in diaspora Greek communities among international folk dance groups.

== Ancient Greek dances ==
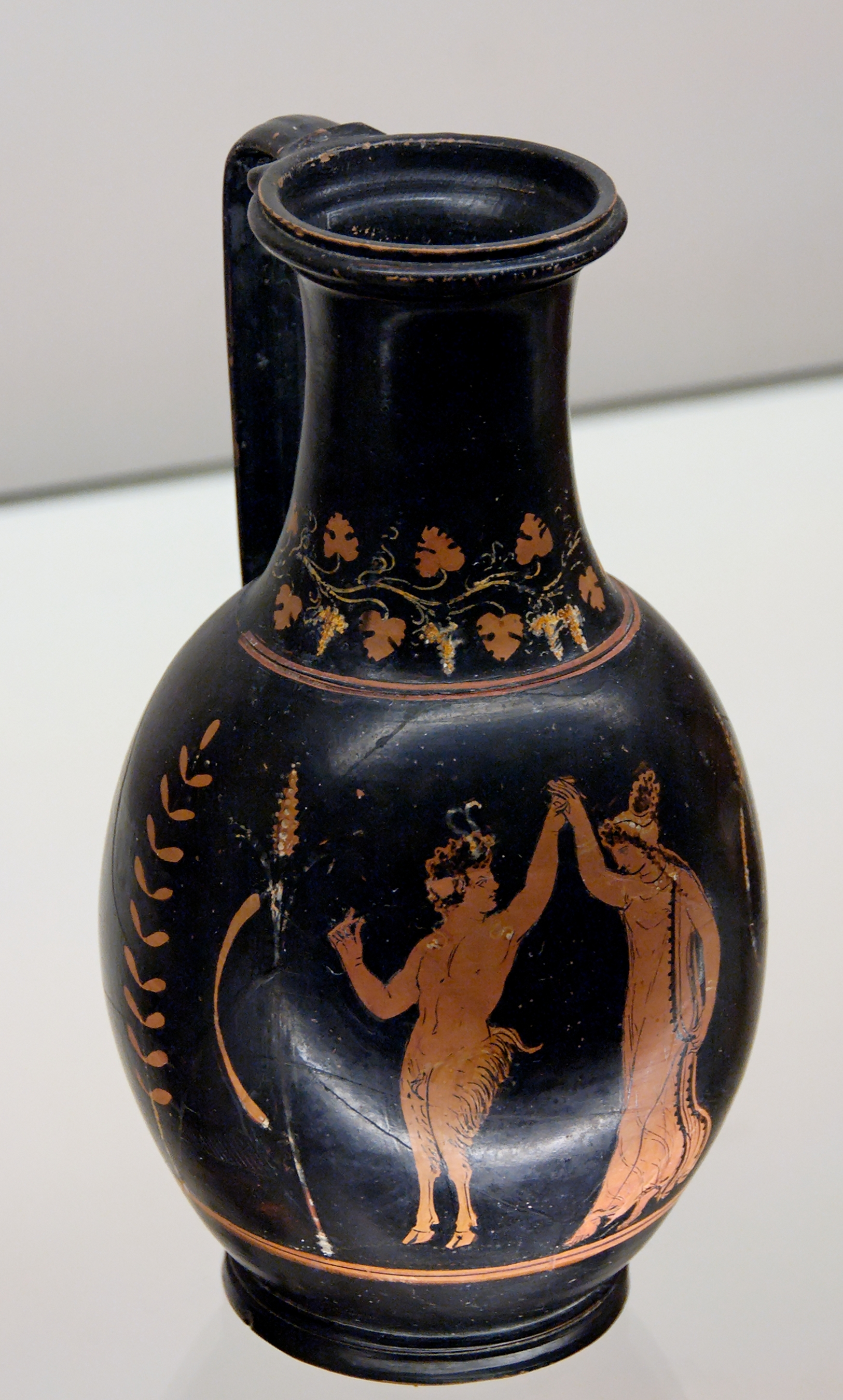
God Pan and a Maenad dancing. Ancient Greek red-figured olpe from Apulia, ca. 320–310 BCE. Pan's right hand fingers are in a snapping position.

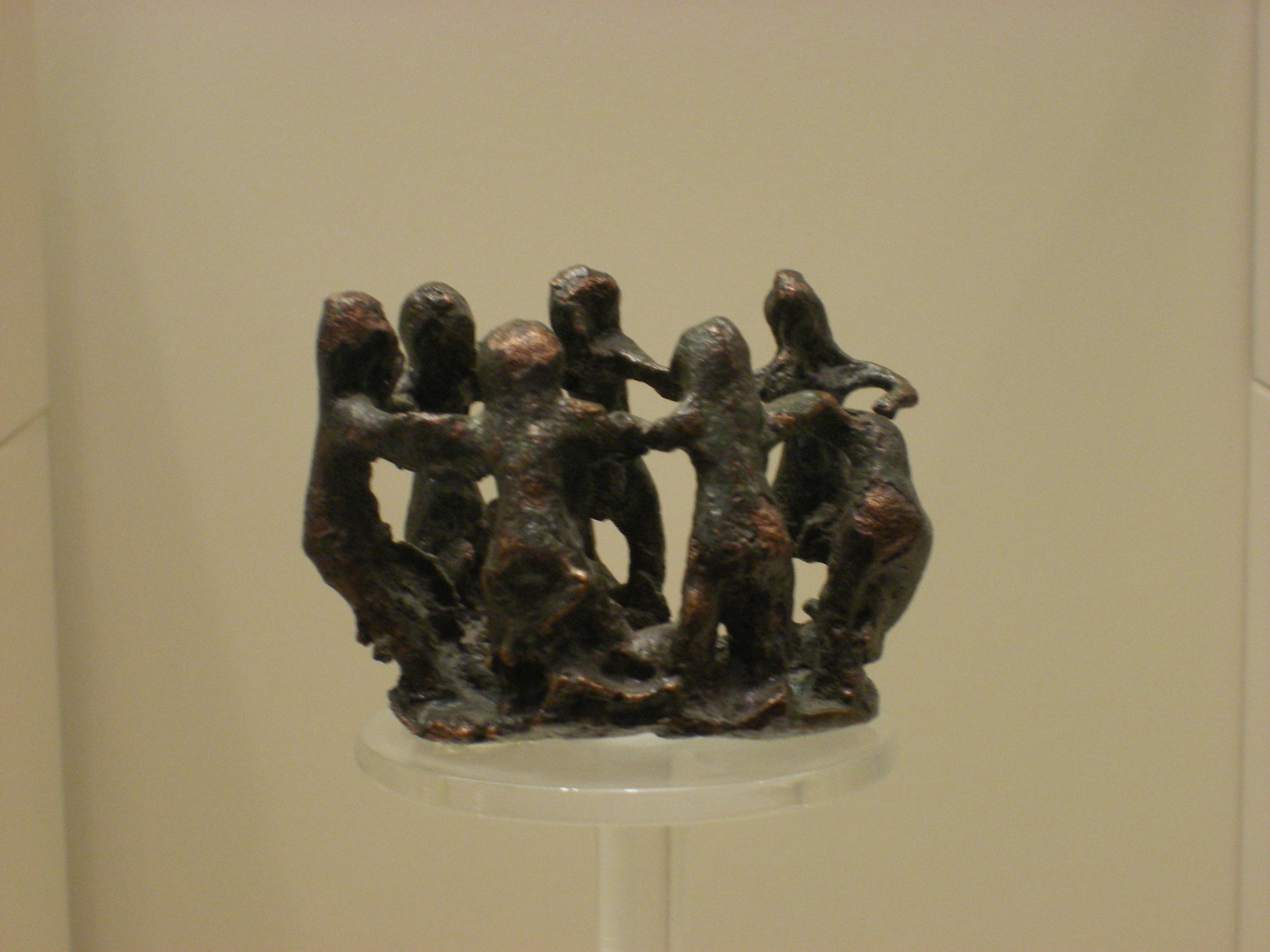
Women dancing. Ancient Greek bronze, 8th century BCE, Archaeological Museum of Olympia.

- Antistrophe
- Carpaea
- Choreia (dance)
- Cordax
- Dionysiakos
- Hyporchema
- Korybantes
- Pyrrhichios (dance)
- Syrtos

In Ancient Greece, dance was a form of ritual, as well as a pastime. Dance could be included in hunting communities, initiation ceremony rituals of age, marriage, and death, entertainment, dance festivals, and religious activity. It was also viewed as a way to educate children about social norms and morals, and was viewed as being essential for physical and emotional development. Dance was used in regard to war as a form of military training, as well as a ritual that served as a mediator between the gods and humans. What modern times may consider a parade, military drill, funeral, children's game, these were seen as forms of dance as long as they were meant to be an exhibition of a rhythmic performance. Strobilos (στρόβιλος) was a whirling dance.

The Suda mentions an ancient Greek dance called Dipodia (Διποδία), meaning two-step/two-footer. It also describes Orchesis (Ὄρχησις), which included two types of dance: one involving acrobatics and another performed with a ball. Aristonicus of Carystus, was known for performing the ball-dance. In addition, the Suda mentions Pantomime dancing (Ὄρχησις παντόμιμος), a form of dance associated with Augustus Caesar and the performers Pylades and Bathyllus.

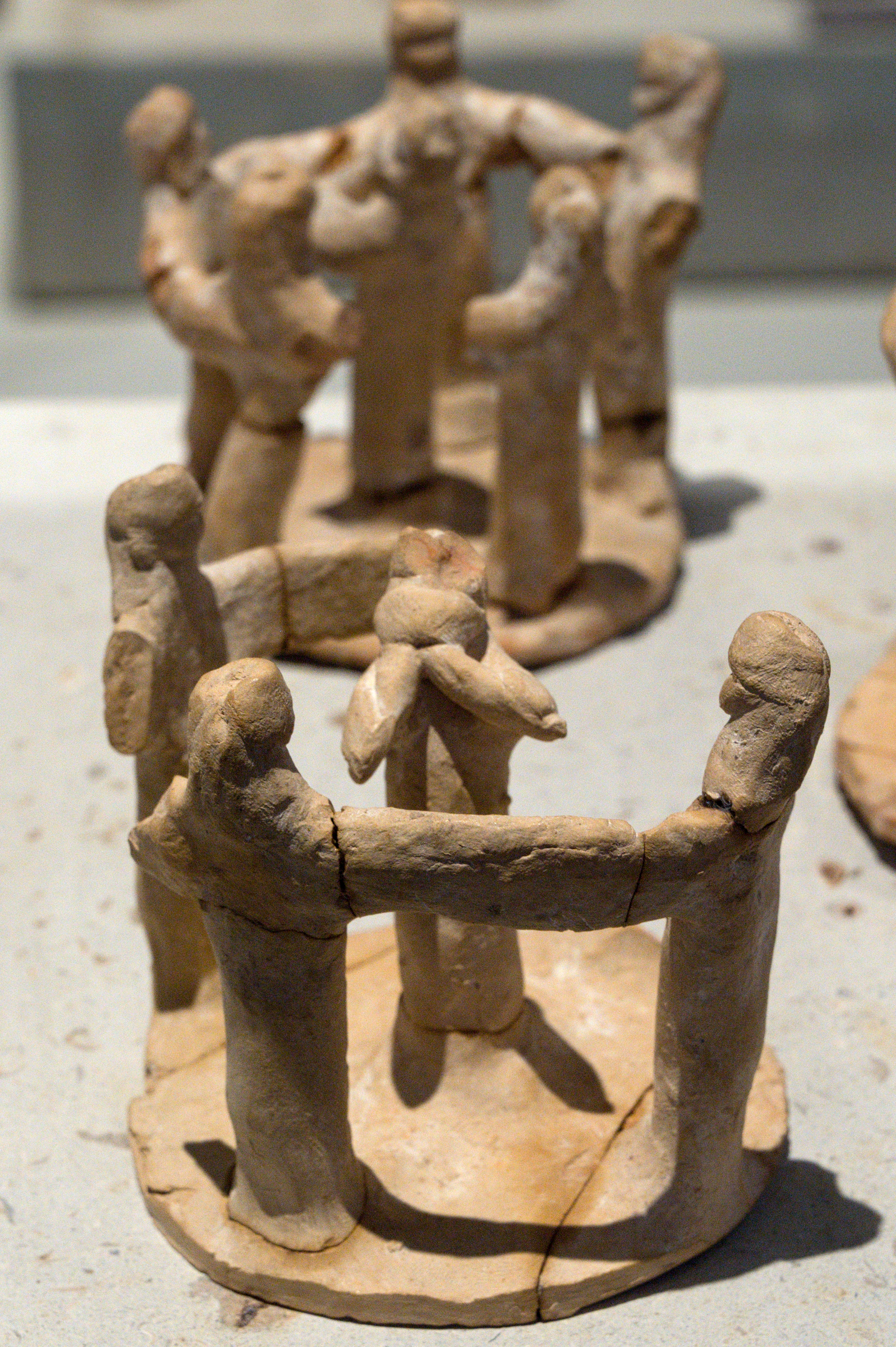
6th century B.C. Women dancing in a circle.

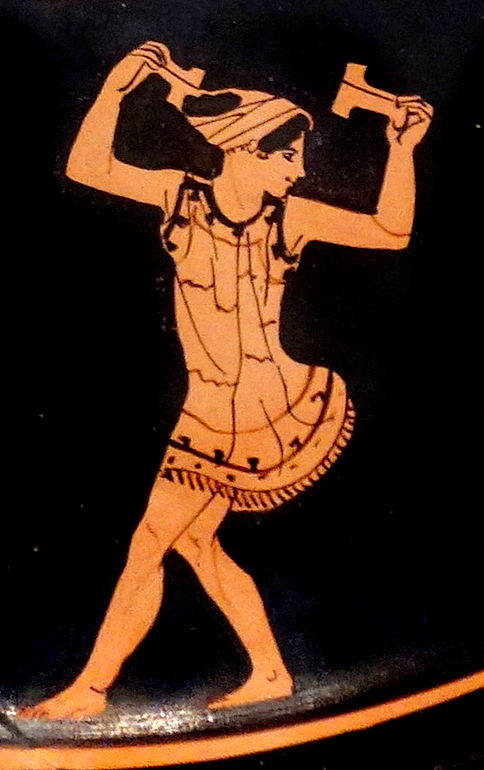
5th century B.C. Woman dancing with crotala

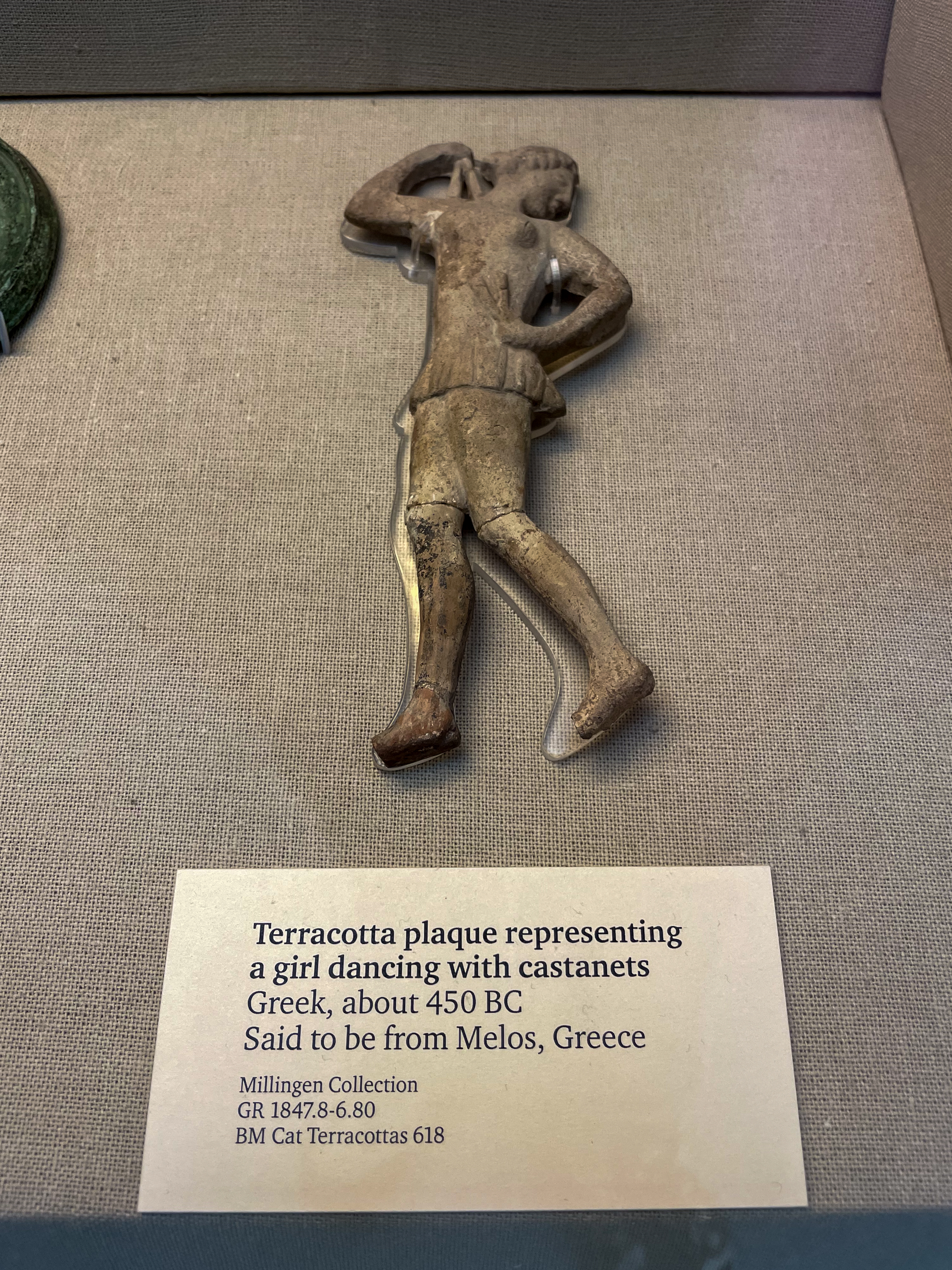
450 B.C. Woman dancing with crotala

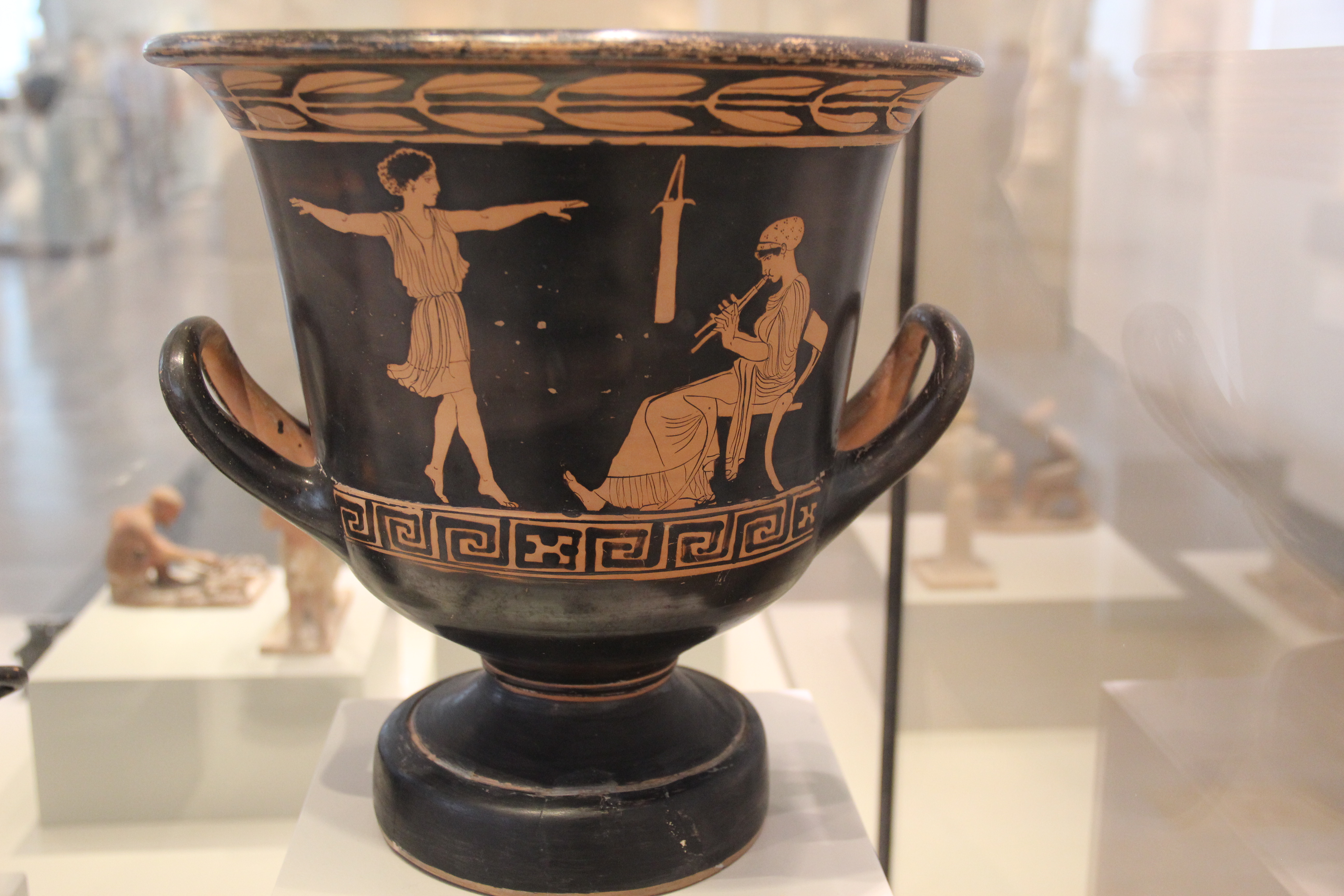
440–430 B.C. Girl in dance class.

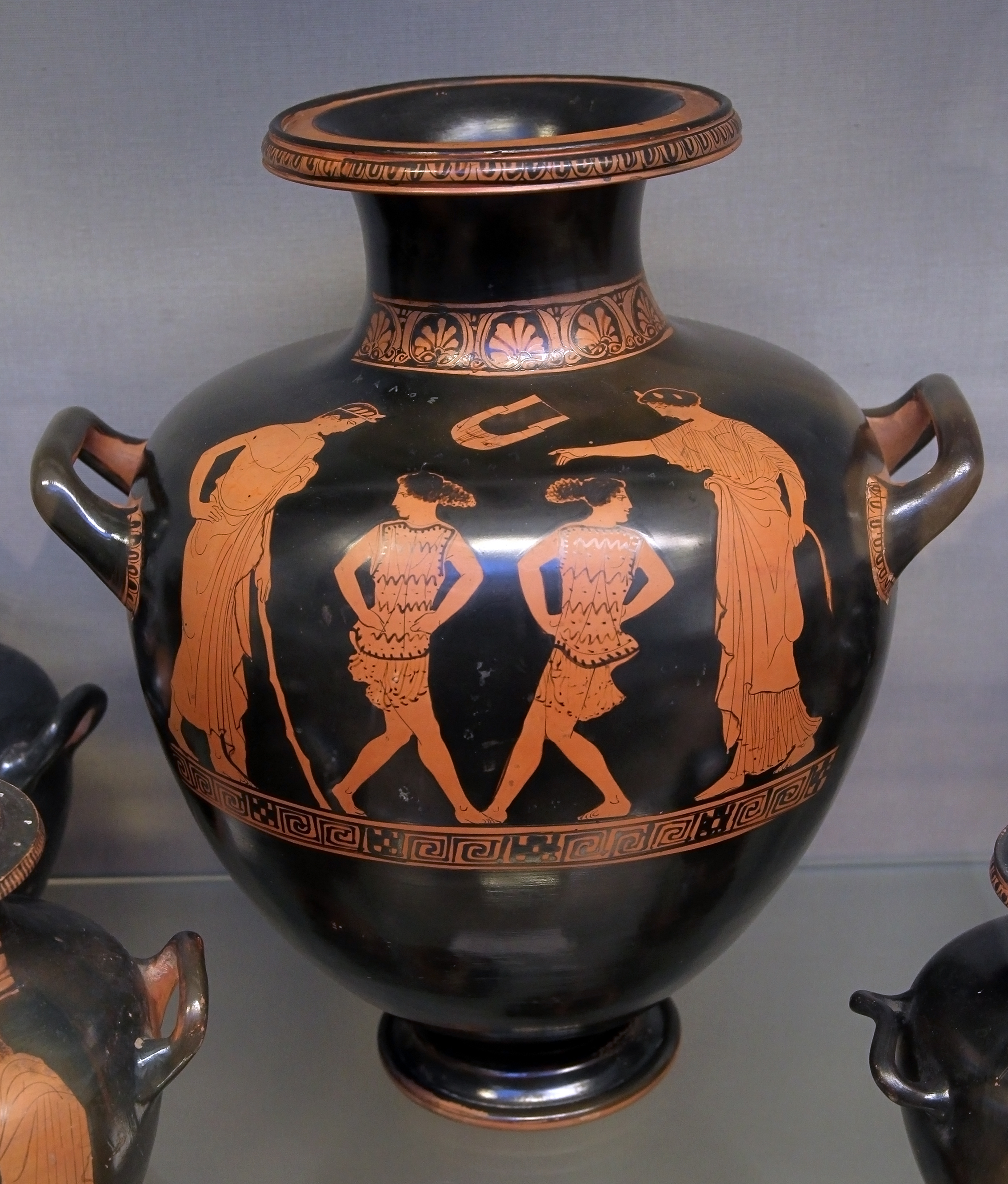
430 B.C. Girls dancing, with an instructress and a youth.

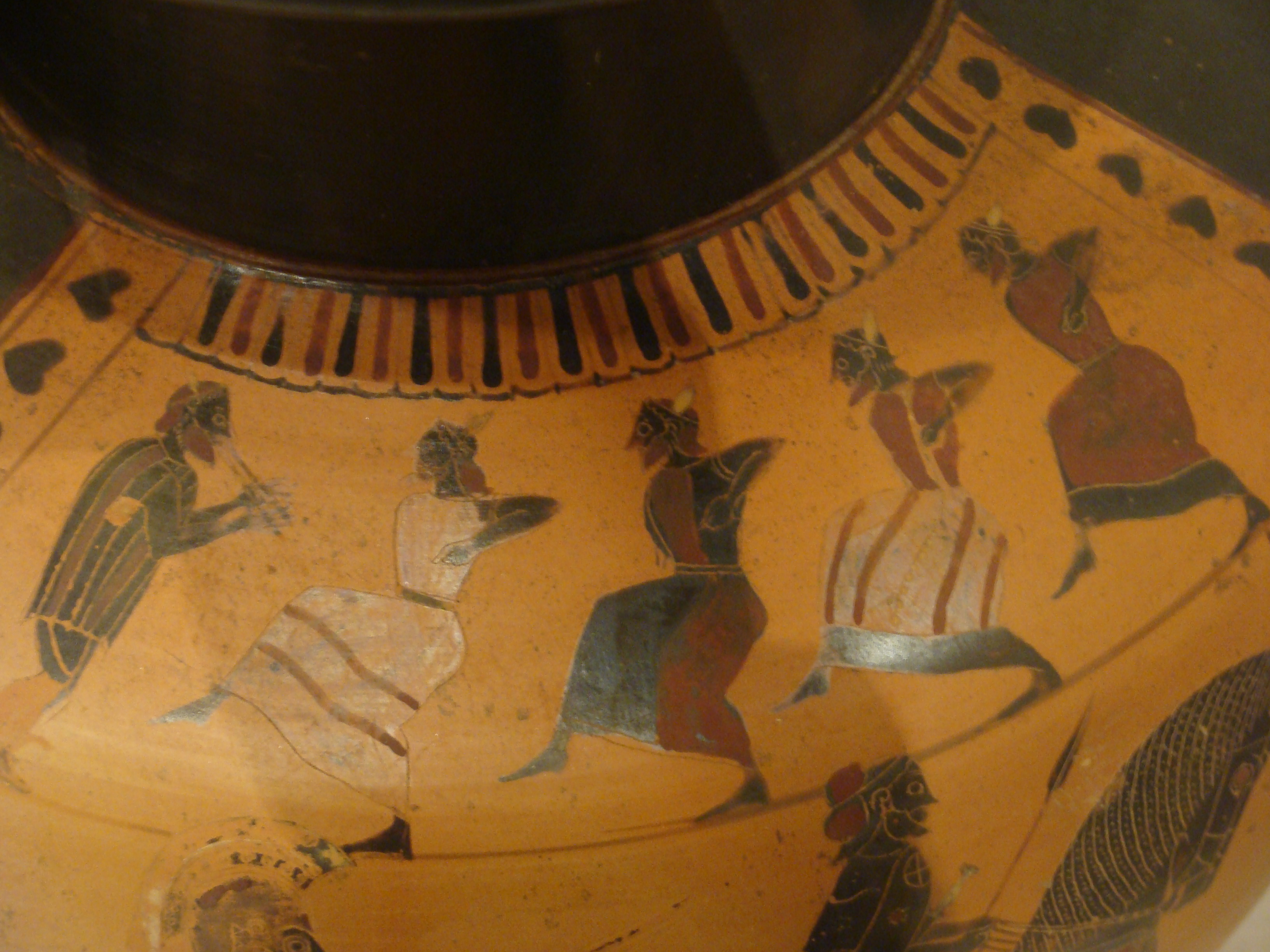
Men dancing

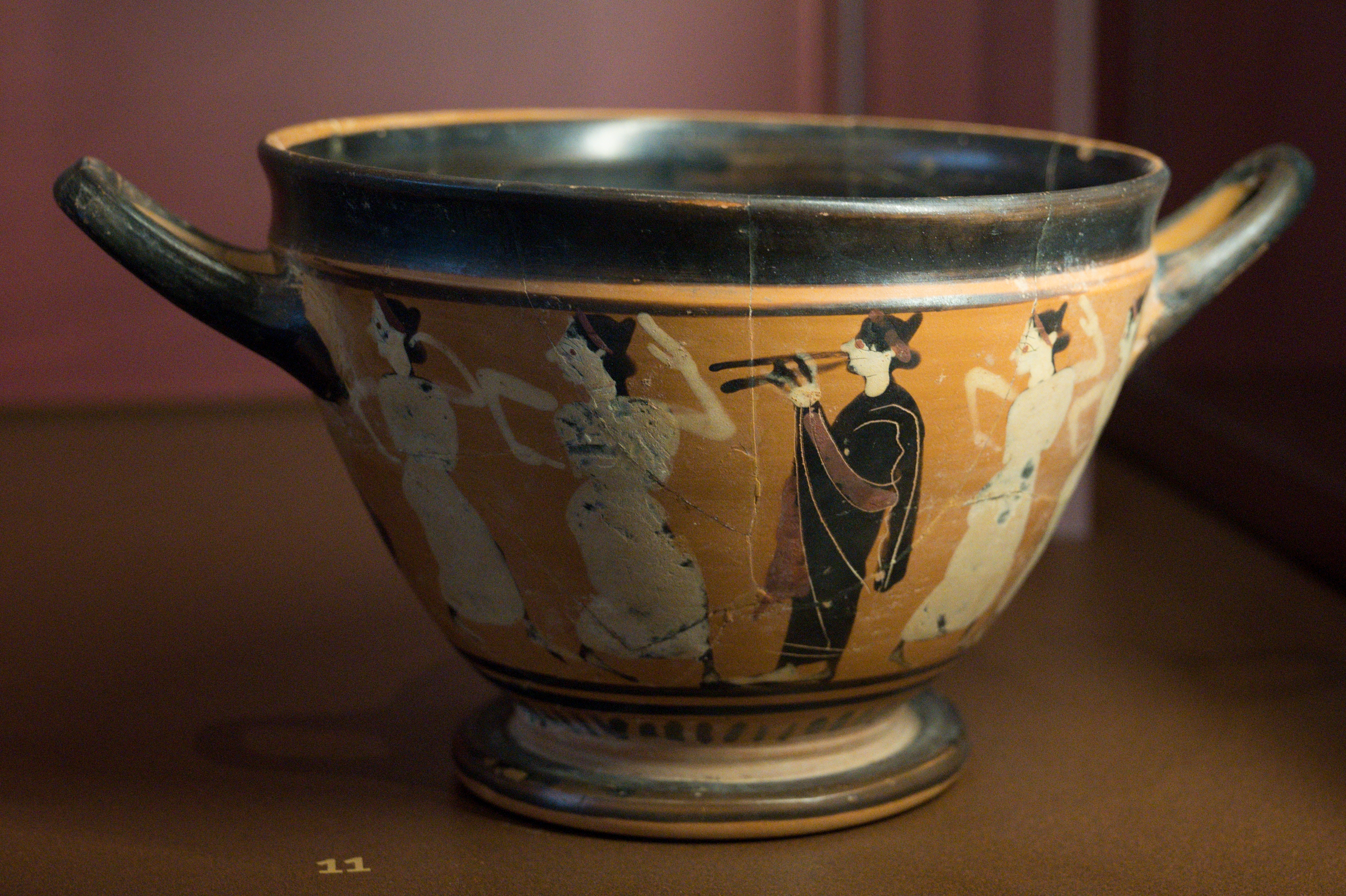
500–490 B.C. Female reedpipe-player (auletria) and female dancer

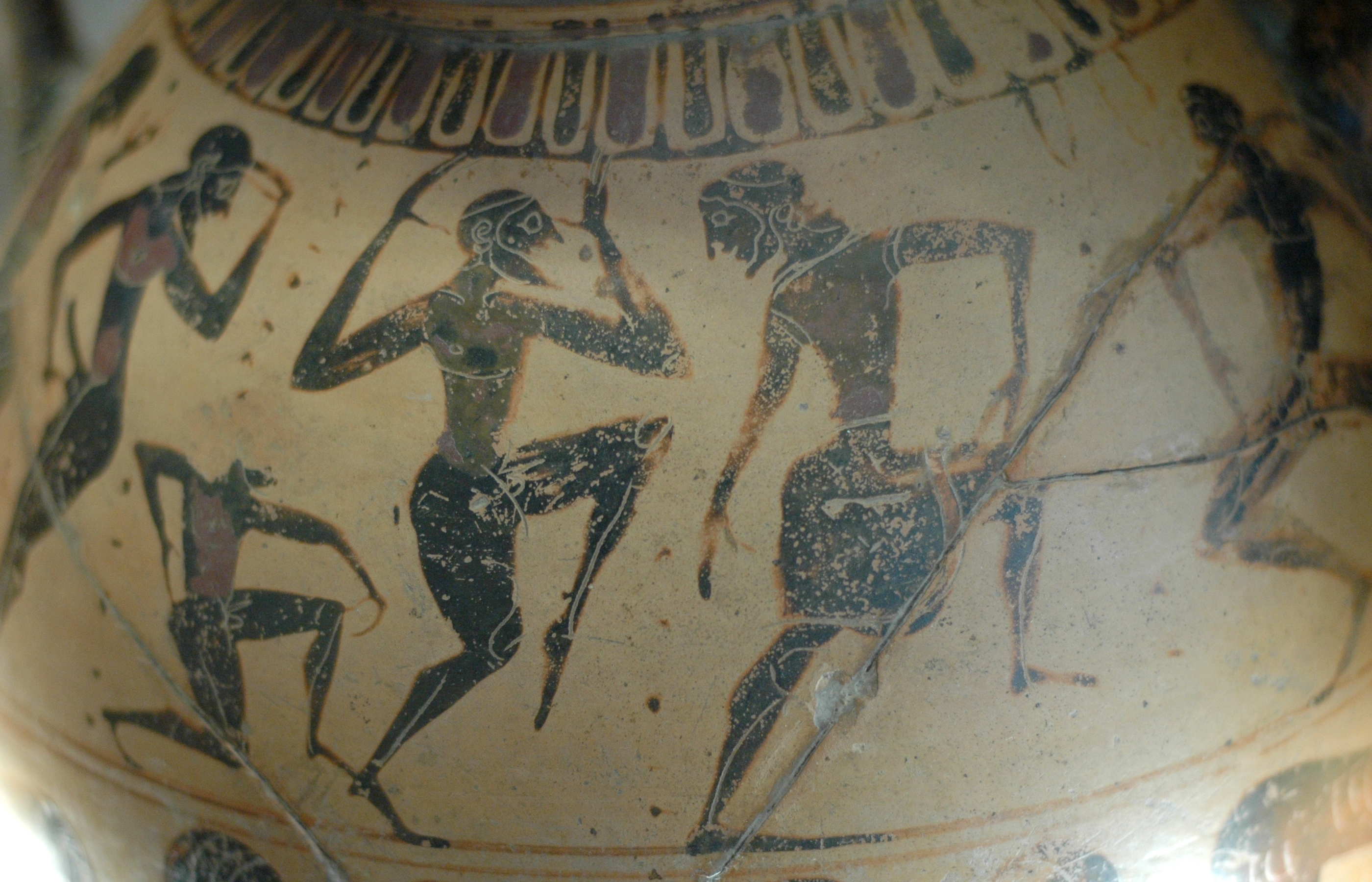
550–540 B.C. Men dancing.

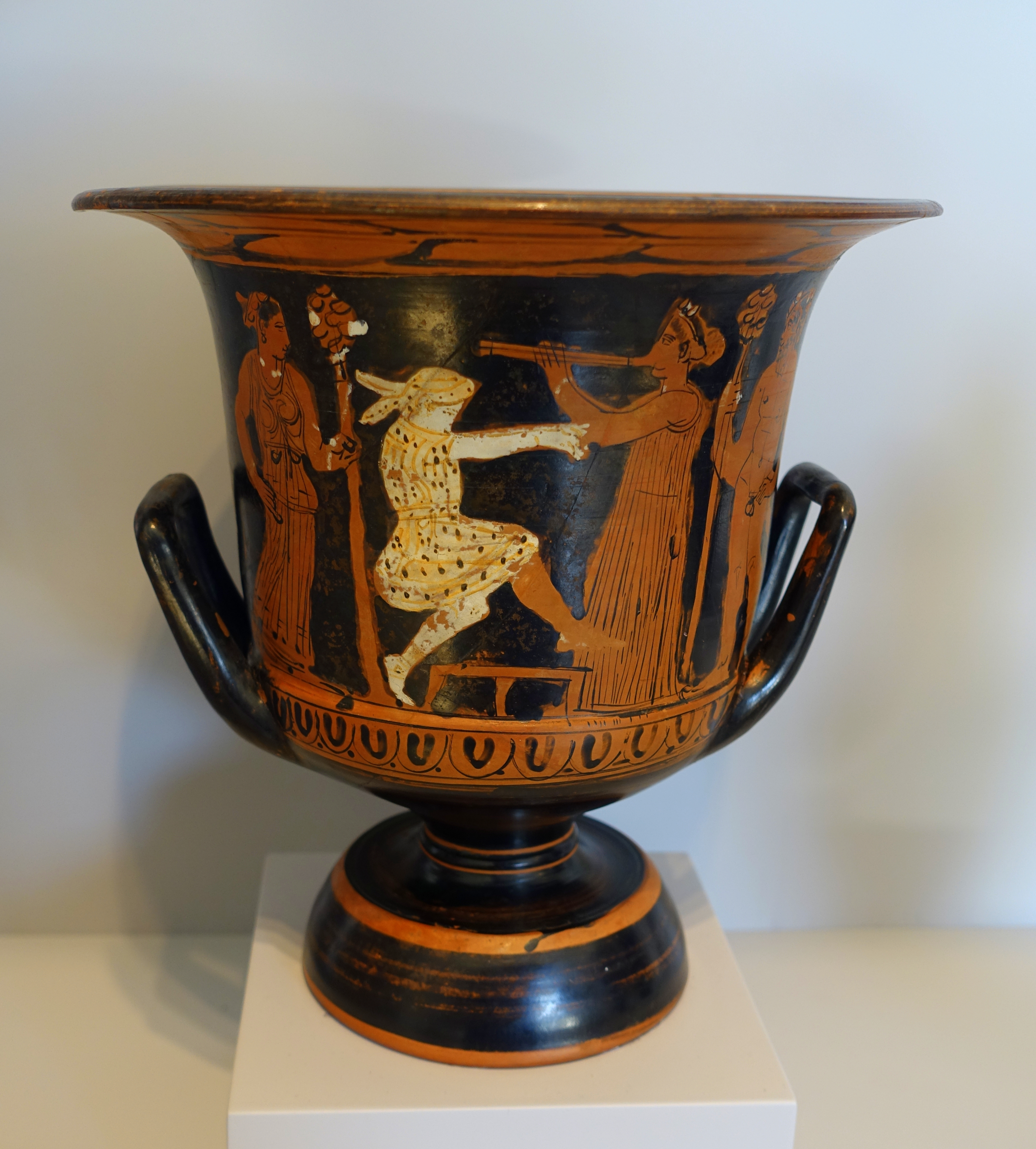
400 B.C. Exotic dance.

== Modern and regional dances ==
=== Aegean Islands ===
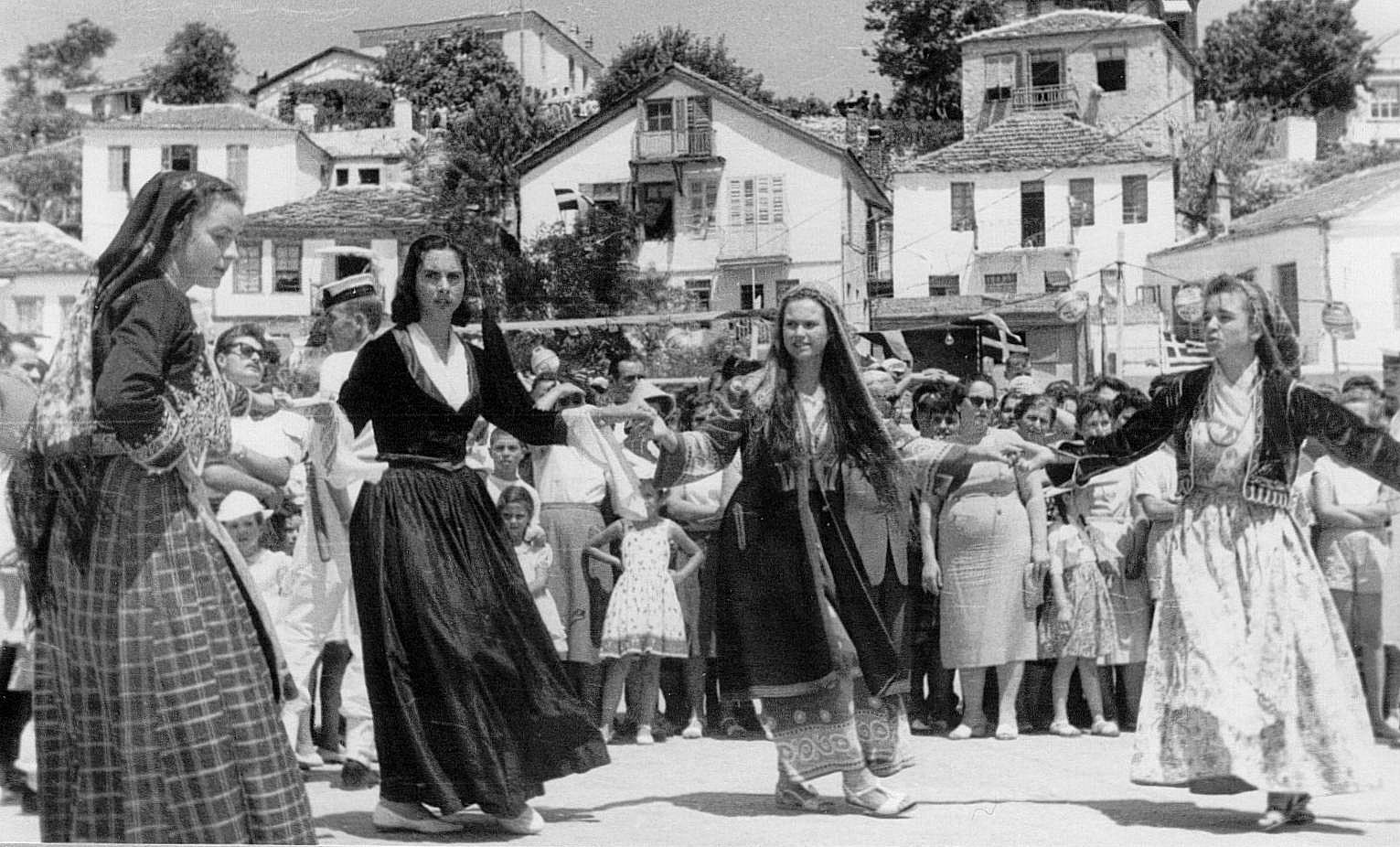
Folk dancers from Thasos, 1958

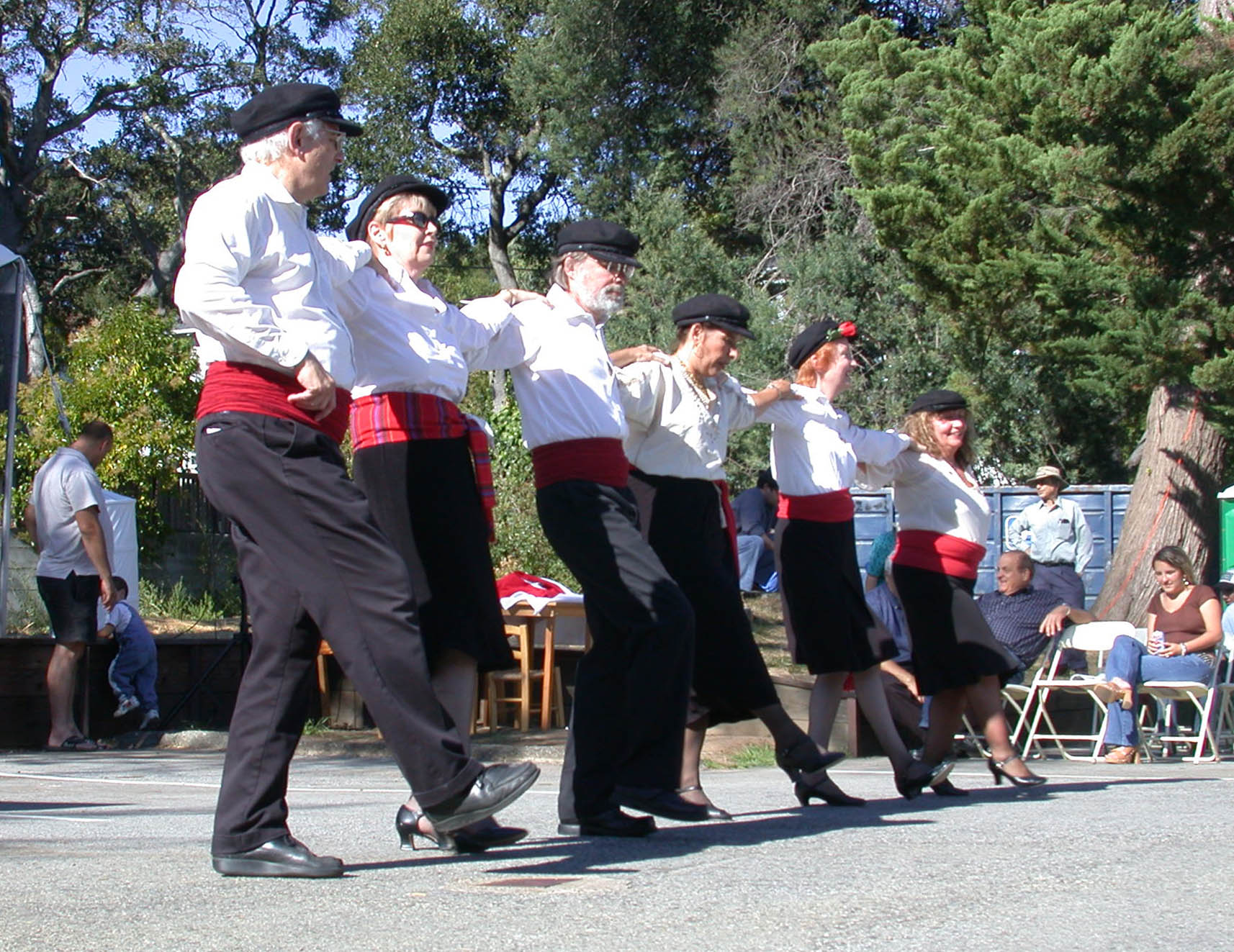
Greek dancers, Belmont, California

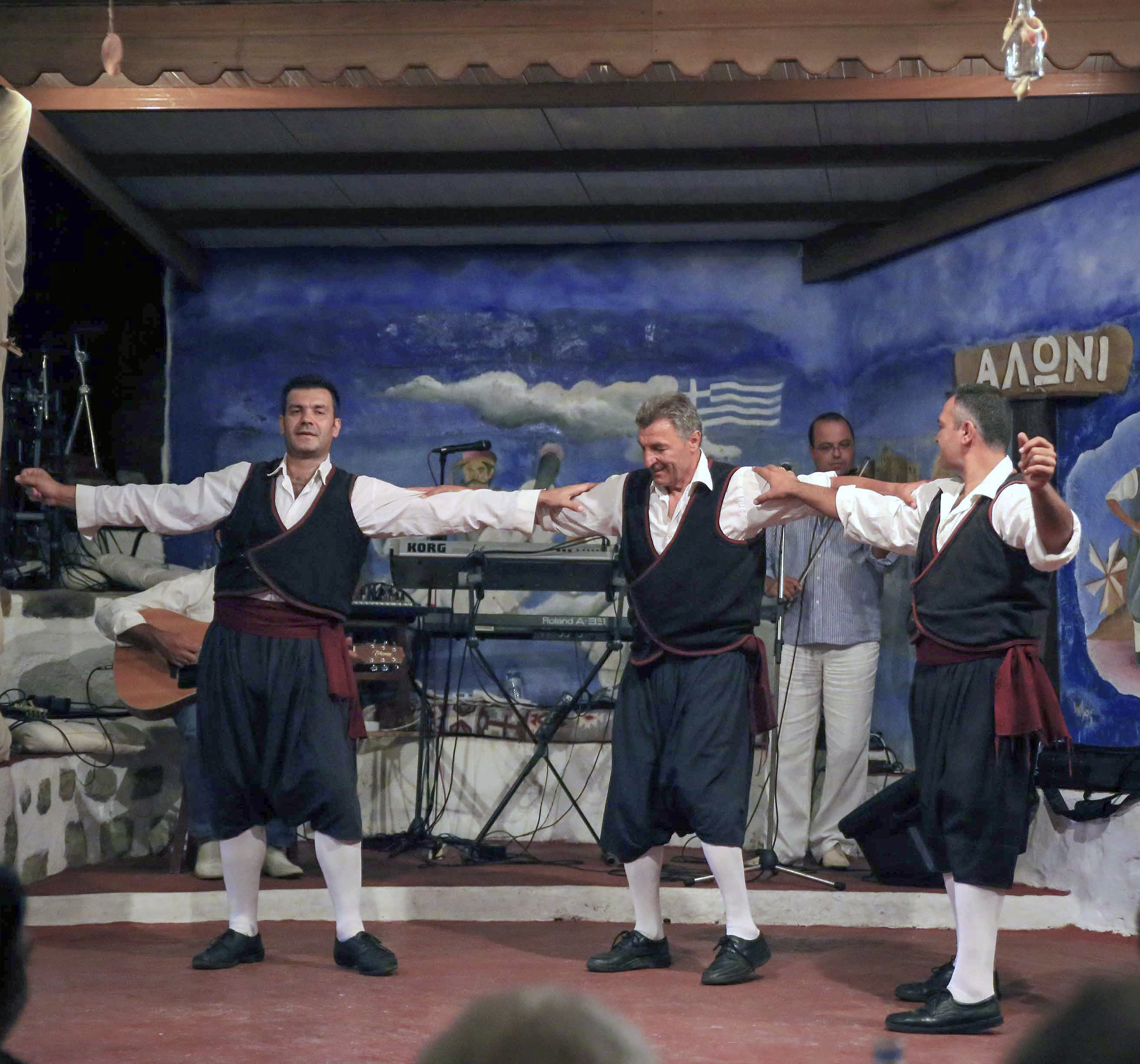
Dancers from Patmos island

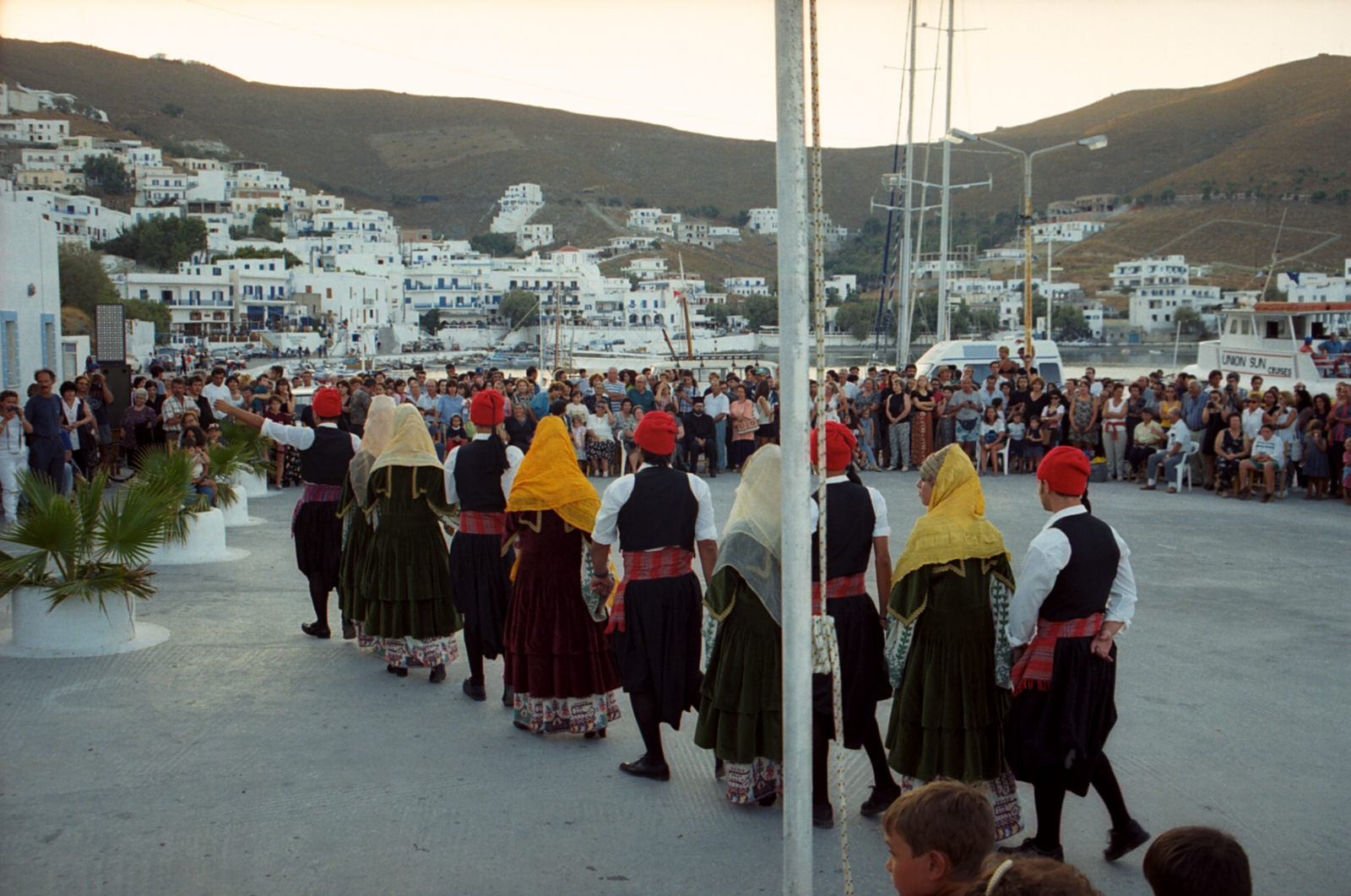
Dancers from Astypalaia

The Aegean islands have dances which are fast in pace and light and jumpy. Many of these dances, however, are couples dances, and not so much in lines. See Nisiotika for more information.

- Antipatitis (Karpathos)
- Arkistis (Karpathos)
- Ballaristos
- Ballos (Naxos, Kythnos, Lemnos)
- Boniatiki Sousta (Rhodes)
- Chaniotika (Leros)
- Ikariotikos (from Ikaria)
- Irene (Tilos)
- Isios (Kalymnos)
- Kamara (Skiathos)
- Kamares (Tilos)
- Karavas (dance) (Naxos)
- Kato Choros (Karpathos)
- Kechagiadikos (Lemnos)
- Kefalonitika (Karpathos)
- Kritikos (Rhoditiko Pidikto) (Rhodes)
- Leriki Sousta (Leros)
- Lerikos (Leros)
- Michanikos (Kalymnos)
- Ola Ta Poulakia (Thasos)
- Panagia (Lemnos)
- Pano Choros (Karpathos)
- Patma (Lemnos)
- Pirgousikos (Chios)
- Plataniotiko Nero (Samos)
- Rhoditiki Sousta (Rhodes)
- Rhoditikos (Rhodes, Leros)
- Rodo (dance)
- Sianos (Karpathos)
- Simetherkatos (Lemnos)
- Samiotiki Sousta (Samos)
- Sousta (Kalymnos)
- Sousta Karpathou (Karpathos)
- Sousta Koaki (Kos)
- Sousta Tilou (Tilos)
- Sperveri (Rhodes)
- Strose Vayia (Samos)
- Symiaki Sousta (Symi)
- Syrtos
- Syrtos Assos (Agathonisi)
- Ta Xila (Mytilene)
- Thermiotikos Karsilamas (Kythnos)
- Thimariotikos (Kalymnos)
- Tourtsikos (Rhodes)
- Trata
- Tsopanikos (Lemnos)
- Zervos (Karpathos)

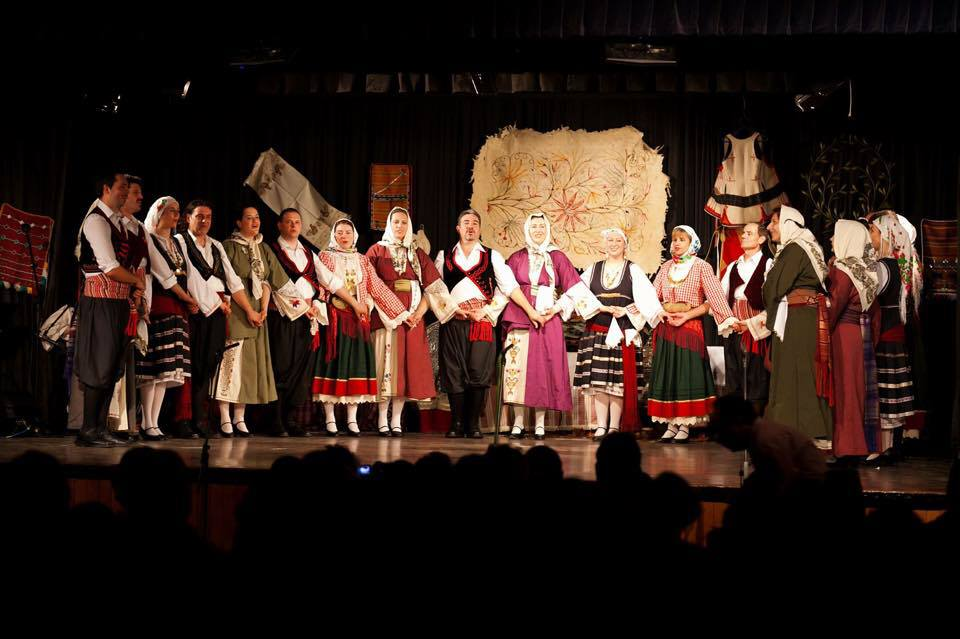
Dance group in Sydney performing dances of Aegean islands

=== Crete ===
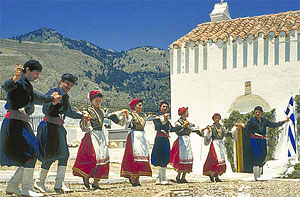
Cretan dancers

These dances are light and jumpy, and extremely cardiovascular.

- Angaliastos
- Anogianos Pidichtos
- Apanomeritis
- Chaniotikos Syrtos
- Ethianos Pidichtos
- Ierapetrikos Pidichtos
- Kanella
- Katsabadianos
- Laziotis
- Maleviziotis
- Mikro Mikraki
- Ntames
- Ntournerakia
- Pentozali
- Pidichtos Lasithou
- Pyrrhichios
- Priniotis
- Rethemniotiki Sousta
- Rodo (dance)
- Siganos
- Sitiakos Pidichtos
- Sousta
- Syrtos Chaniotikos
- Trizali
- Xenobasaris
- Zervodexos

=== Central Greece ===
- Antikristos
- Hasapiko
- Sirtaki
- Kalamatianos
- Kavodorikos (Karystos)
- Kleistos
- Pyrrhichios
- Syrtos
- Lambri Kamara (Megara)
- Loulouvikos (from Megara)
- Tis Triantafilias Ta Fila (Megara)
- Trata (from Megara)
- Tsamikos

=== Epirus ===
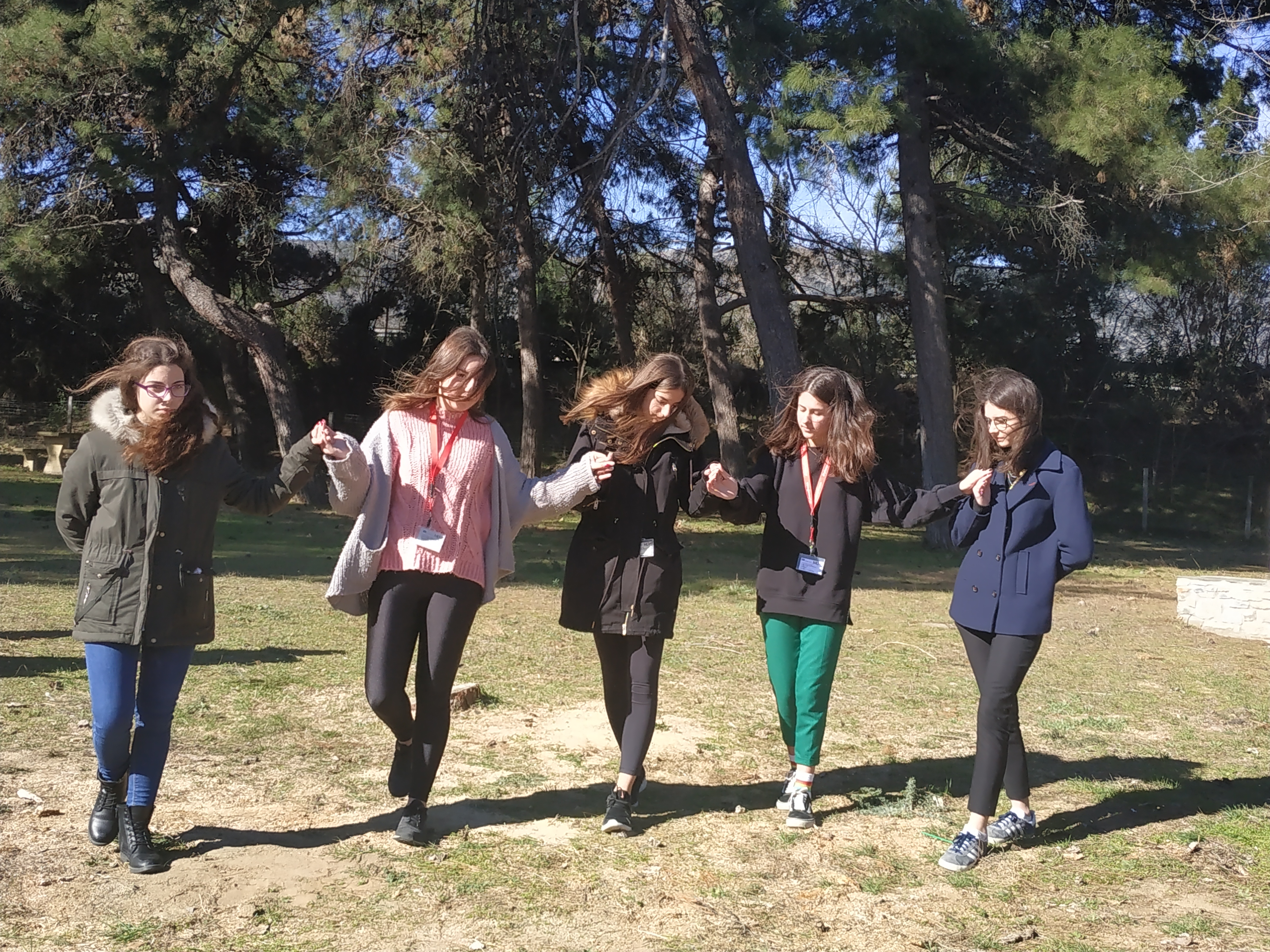
Pogonisios steps

Epirote dances are the most slow and heavy in all of Greece. Great balance is required in order to perform these dances.

- Berati
- Tsamikos
- Fisounis
- Genovefa
- Giatros
- Horos Tis Nifis or Lipothimarikos
- Kapitan Louka
- Koftos
- Klamata
- Metsovitikos
- Palamakia
- Papadia
- Papiggo
- Parzakana
- Pogonisios
- Sta Dio
- Sta Tria
- Singathistos Metsovou
- Zagorisios

=== Peloponnese ===
The dances of the Peloponnese are very simple and heavy, with the leader of the line improvising.

- Ai Georgis
- Diplos Horos
- Geranos
- Kalamatianos
- Maniatikos
- Monodiplos
- Panagiotis (dance)
- Syrtos
- Tsakonikos
- Tsamikos

=== Ionian Islands ===
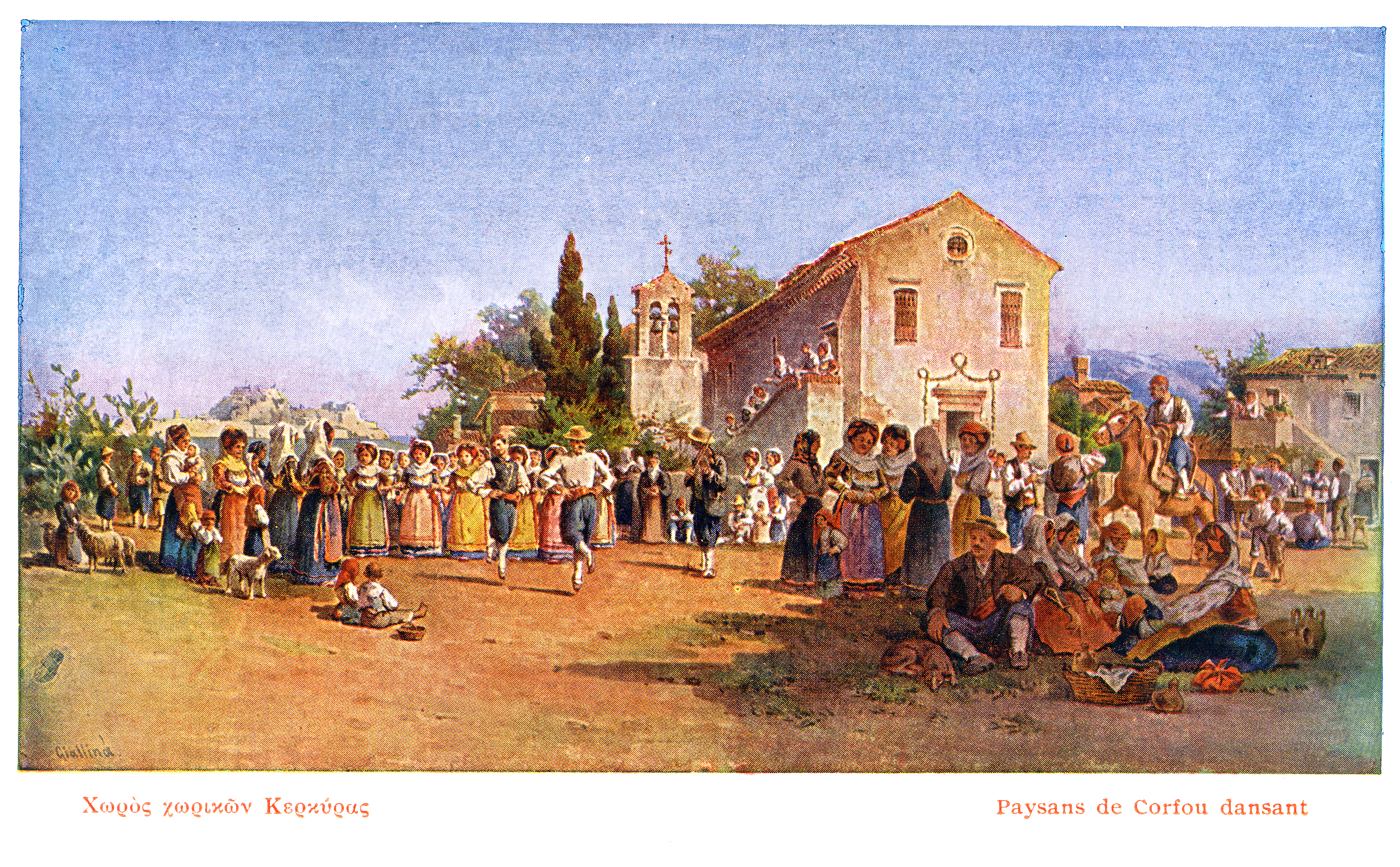
Corfiot peasant dance (1906)

- Ai Georgis (Corfu)
- Ballos (Lefkada, Cefalonia)
- Bourdaris (Kythira)
- Cerigotikos (Kythira)
- Potamitikos (Kythira)
- Ai Georgis (Kythira)
- Divaratikos (Cefalonia)
- Fourlana (Corfu)
- Kerkiraikos (Corfu)
- Lefkaditikos (Lefkada)
- Levantitikos (Zakynthos)
- Mermigas (Cefalonia)
- Mesaritikos (Kythira)
- Rouga (Corfu)
- Syrtos (Cefalonia)
- Thiakos (Lefkada)

=== Macedonia ===
Dances in Macedonia vary. Most are solid and are performed using heavy steps, whilst others are fast and agile. Most dances begin slow and increase in speed.

Western Macedonia

- Akritikos (Florina)
- Antikristos
- Bougatsas (Florina)
- Dimitroula
- Diplos Choros Tis Rokas
- Gaida Dance
- Gerakina
- Gerontikos
- Endeka Kozanis
- Kastorianos
- Kori Eleni
- Kapitan Louka
- Hasapiko
- Leventikos (Florina)
- Makedonikos antikristos
- Makrinitsa dance
- Nizamikos (Naousa)
- Omorfoula (Florina)
- O Nikolos
- Partalos
- Poustseno
- Proskinitos
- Raikos (Edessa)
- Servikos
- Simbethera (Florina)
- Stamoulo
- Stankina (Edessa)
- Syre Syre (Edessa)
- Syrtos Makedonias
- Tis Dimitroulas
- Tis Marias
- Tranos Choros (Kozani)
- Trita Pata (Naousa)
- Tsamikos Deskatis
- Tsotsos (Florina)
- Tsourapia (Florina)
- Zacharoula
- Zaramo (dance)

Eastern Macedonia

- Antikristos
- Drousas
- Kampana
- Kori Eleni
- Tefkotos

=== Thessaly ===
Dances in Thessaly are similar in style to the dances of Epirus. Mostly with slow, heavy movements. However, there are some dances that are also faster-paced. The leader can improvise in these dances similarly to those dances from the Epirus, Central Greece and Peloponnese.

- Dionysiakos
- Gaitanaki
- Galanogalani
- Girogalakis
- Kalamatianos
- Kamara
- Kangeli
- Karagouna
- Kleistos
- Kleistos Argitheas
- Koftos
- Lafina
- Pilioritikos
- Rougatsiarikos
- Souzana
- Syrtos
- Tsamiko
- Zacharoula

=== Arvanites ===
- Ntarsa
- Plektos
- Tsamikos

=== Thrace ===
Thracian dance is generally skippy and light. In most Thracian dances, the men are only permitted to dance at the front of the line. Musicians and singers such as Chronis Aidonidis and Kariofilis Doitsidis have brought to life the music of Thrace.

- Antikristos
- Baidouska
- Daktili
- Dendritsi
- Drista
- Gaitani
- Giknas
- Hasapia
- Koulouriastos
- Mandilatos
- Papisios
- Singathistos
- Syrtos
- Tapeinos Horos
- Tapeinos Paschaliatikos
- Tripati
- Zonaradiko

=== Northern Thrace / Eastern Thrace ===
The dances of (Northern Thrace) are fast, upbeat and similar to the Thracian style of dance. Dances from the town of Kavakli and Neo Monastiri are the most popular.

- Antikristos
- Bogdanos
- Douzikos
- Kallinitikos
- Katsivelikos
- Kinigitos
- Koutsos
- Miliso
- Podaraki
- Sfarlis
- Singathistos
- Stis Treis
- Syrtos Banas
- Tamzara
- Tremouliastos
- Troiro
- Tsestos
- Zervos
- Zervos Banas
- Zervodexios
- Zonaradiko

=== Pontus ===
The dances of the Pontic Greeks from the Black Sea were mostly performed by the Pontic soldiers in order to motivate themselves before going into a battle. The dances are accompanied by the Pontian lyra, also called kemenche by Turkish people.

- Aneforitissa Kizela
- Apo Pan Kai Ka Matsouka
- Atsiapat
- Dipat
- Etere Trapezounta
- Fona Argyroupolis
- Gemoura
- Getiere Argyroupolis
- Kalon Koritsi
- Karsilamas
- Kazatska
- Kochari
- Kori Kopela
- Kounichton Nikopolis
- Kousera
- Lafraga
- Letsi Kars (Kars)
- Letsina Kars (Kars)
- Macheria
- Militsa
- Miteritsa
- Momoeria
- Omal
- Patoula
- Podaraki
- Pontic Serra
- Sampson (Samsun)
- Seranitsa
- Siton Imeras
- Tamsara Nikopolis
- Tamsara Trapezountas
- Tas
- T'apan Ke Ka Matsouka
- Tik Diplo
- Tik Imeras
- Tik Mono
- Tik Nikopolis
- Tik Togias or Togialidikon
- Titara Argyroupolis
- Tria Ti Kotsari
- Trigona Kerasountas
- Trigona Matsoukas
- Trigona Trapezountas
- Tripat Matsouka
- Tromakton
- Tyrfon or Tryfon Bafra

=== Asia Minor ===
Erythrae

- Alatsatiani
- Horos Attaris
- Ballos
- Byzantine dance
- Paschalinos
- Geranos
- Sousta
- Syrtos
- Syrtos Karabourniotikos
- Tapeinos
- Zeibekiko

Cappadocia The Cappadocian dances were mainly sung in the Cappadocian dialect of Cappadocian Greeks or the Karamanlides. Dances varied from social dances to ritualistic dances.

- Ai Vassiliatikos
- Choros Koutalion
- Choros Leilaloum
- Choros Macherion
- Choros Mandilion
- Ensoma
- Tas Kemerli
- Tsitsek Ntag
- Pasha/Antipasha
- Leilaloum
- Vara Vara
- Konialis
- Kouseftos
- Sei Tata
- Syrtos
- Zeibekiko

Sinasos The Dances & Songs of Sinasos Mustafapasa.

- Apopsin Ta Mesanihta
- Isos Sinasos
- Koniali
- Malamatenios Argalios
- Pago Stou Prousas Ta Vouna
- Simeris i Simeriani

=== Constantinople ===
- Byzantine dance
- Hasapiko
- Tesera Matia
- Patinada Nyfis
- Rododachtilos

=== Griko (Southern Italy) ===
- Pizzica
- Tarantella

=== Cyprus ===
Men's Dances

- Antikristos
- Defteros Karsilamas
- Protos Karsilamas
- Syrtos
- Tatsia
- Tritos Karsilamas

Women's Dances

- Antikristos
- Defteros Karsilamas
- Protos Karsilamas
- Syrtos
- Tetartos Karsilamas
- Tritos Karsilamas

=== Aromanians ===
- Antipera
- Hatzistergiou
- Kalamatianos
- Kato Stin Aspri Petra
- La Valia di Giannena
- Sta Tria
- Syrtos

=== Sarakatsani ===
- Apano Stin Triantafilia
- Choros Katsa
- Despo
- Diplos Choros
- Sta Tria
- Tsamikos

== Greek dancing in the United States ==
Within the United States, Greek Americans participate in Greek dancing in order to preserve their heritage and culture. Greeks of all ages can be seen showcasing their skills at Greek Festivals which take place year round, often hosted by Greek Orthodox churches, or at various competitions in which groups practice dances from specific parts of Greece in order to perform in front of judges. GOYA, a spiritual ministry, is meant to give young people an opportunity to celebrate their shared culture and region while building bonds within the community.

=== Greek Orthodox Folk Dance and Choral Festival (FDF) ===
Since 1976, the Greek Orthodox Metropolis of San Francisco has held a convention that allows Greek Dance groups from various churches in the Pacific Region of the United States to compete. Up to 3,000 people participate annually and it is described as the largest youth ministry program in the Metropolis of San Francisco. Within the competition, there are four divisions, two of which are judged and two of which are exhibition suites. Division I and Division II are judged by a table of judges who have done years of research in Greece and instructed others on the styling and other important elements of Greek dancing. Each competing team will be placed into a division and group based on the average age of the team. Each team performs two times and perfected suites that can be from many places in Greece (islands, mainland, villages) and feature many different dances. The judges will score the teams based on their costumes, singing, stage presence, styling, and how closely it resembles the region that their suite is from.

== See also ==
- Greek folk music
- Dora Stratou
- Greek musical instruments
- Byzantine music
- Middle Eastern dance
- Assyrian folk dance
- Armenian dance
- Kurdish dance
- Turkish dance
