= Music of Thessaly =

Music of the geographic and historical region

Music of Thessaly is the music of the geographic and historical region of Thessaly (Greek: Θεσσαλία) in Greece. Folk dances from Thessaly are slow and stately, however the music accompanying the Syrtos dance, is typically livelier and more energetic than it is in other parts of Greece and include: Kalamatianos, Thessalikos, Dionysiakos, koftos, Kalamatiano, Syrtos, kleistos, kangeli, gaitanaki, tsamikos, Pilioritikos, Svarniara, Sta tria, Karagouna, Kleistos, zeibekiko, Rougatsiarikos, Tsamiko of Deskati, antikrystos and galanogalani.

Also, every year in Tyrnavos occurs the Phallus Festival before Easter, a pagan fertility festival in honour of the god of Mount Olympus, Dionysus which locates in ancient Greece and is one of the most famous worldwide. There is also a long-standing tradition of a cappella music in Thessaly, including in dance music.

== See also ==
- Dionysiakos
- Music of Greece
- Greek folk music
