= Music of the Peloponnese =

Music of the geographic and historical region

Music of the Peloponnese is the music of the geographic and historical region of Peloponnese. Folk dances from Peloponnese, include the basic form of syrtos music and its alternative kinds.

== Dances ==
The most common dances of Peloponnese are:

- Kalamatianos
- Kalamatiano
- monodiplos
- Ai Georgis
- Tsakonikos
- Tsamikos

== See also ==
- Music of Greece
- Greek dances
- Greek folk music
