= Laïko =

Greek music genre

- Stylistic origins: Greek folk music; Byzantine music; rebetiko
- Cultural origins: Greece
- Derivative forms: Entechno

Subgenres
- Scyladico

Laïko (Greek: λαϊκό) (Note: English: /laɪˈkoʊ/ ly-KOH; Greek: λαϊκό [τραγούδι], romanized: laïkó [tragoúdi], pronounced [lai̯ˈko tɾaˈɣuði]; pl. λαϊκά [τραγούδια], laïká [tragoúdia], IPA: [lai̯ˈka tɾaˈɣuði̯a]) (Note: The term laïkó tragoúdi can be translated as 'song of the people' or 'popular song'. The word laïkó is the neuter form of the Greek word laïkós (λαϊκός), meaning 'popular, folk'.) is a Greek folk-pop music genre. Laiko is a prominent Greek music genre composed in the Greek language, rooted in the traditional folklore and musical heritage of the Greek people which bridges the gap between traditional folk and urban music. Also referred to as a "folk song", or "urban folk music" (Note: αστική λαϊκή μουσική, astikí laïkí mousikí, IPA: [as̠tiˈci lai̯ˈci mus̠iˈci]) in its plural form, Laïkó changed forms over the decades after the commercialization of Rebetiko music.

== Rebetiko and elafro tragoudi ==
Until the 1930s the Greek discography was dominated by two musical genres: the Greek folk music demotica (Note: δημοτικά, dimotiká, IPA: [ðimotiˈka]) and the elaphro tragoudi. (Note: ελαφρό τραγούδι, IPA: [elaˈfɾo tɾaˈɣuði]; lit. 'light[weight] song') The latter was represented by ensembles of singers/musicians or solo artists like Attik and Nikos Gounaris. It was the Greek version of the international popular music of the era. In the 1930s the first rebetiko recordings had a massive impact on Greek music. Markos Vamvakaris stated that they "were the first to record laïka songs". In the years to follow this type of music, the first form of what is now called laïko tragoudi, became the mainstream Greek music.

== Classic laïko ==
Marinella.

Classic laïko, as it is known today, was the mainstream popular music of Greece during mainly the 1960s and 1970s. Laïkó evolved from the traditional music of the ancient and the medieval Greek era and was established until the present day. Laïkó was dominated by singers such as Nikos Xanthopoulos and composers such as Mimis Plessas. Among the most significant songwriters and lyricists of this period are George Zambetas and the big names of the Rebetiko era that were still in business, like Vassilis Tsitsanis and Manolis Chiotis. Many artists combined the traditions of éntekhno and laïkó with considerable success, such as the composers Stavros Xarchakos and Mimis Plessas. Legendary figures associated with laïko (specifically Zeibekiko) are Dimitris Mitropanos, Stratos Dionysiou and Stelios Kazantzidis.

== Contemporary laïko ==
Contemporary laïko, (Note: σύγχρονο λαϊκό, sýnchrono laïkó, IPA: [ˈs̠iŋxɾono lai̯ˈko]) also called modern laïko or sometimes laïko-pop, can be called in Greece the mainstream music genre, with variations in plural form as contemporary laïka. Along with moderna laïko, it is currently Greece's mainstream music genre. The main cultural Greek dances and rhythms of today's Greek music culture laïka are Nisiotika, Syrta, Antikristos, Rebetika, Hasapiko, Zeibekiko, Kalamatianos, Kangeli and Syrtaki.

The more cheerful version of laïko, called elaphro laïko, was often used in musicals during the Golden Age of Greek cinema. The Greek Peiraiotes superstar Tolis Voskopoulos gave the after-modern version of Greek laïko (Note: ελληνικό λαϊκό, hellinikó laïkó) listenings. Many artists have combined the traditions of éntekhno and laïkó with considerable success, such as the composers Mimis Plessas and Stavros Xarchakos.

Contemporary laïká emerged as a style in the early 1980s. An indispensable part of the contemporary laïka culture is the pista. (Note: πίστα písta, pl. πίστες pístes; lit. 'dance floor, venue') Nightclubs at which the DJs play only contemporary laïká where colloquially known on the 1990s and 2000s as hellinadika. (Note: ελληνάδικα, IPA: [eliˈnaðika]) Modern laïko is mainstream Greek laïko music mixed in with modern Western influences, from such international mainstream genres as pop and dance music. Renowned songwriters or lyricists of contemporary laïka after 1990 include Alekos Chrysovergis, Nikos Karvelas, Phoebus, Nikos Terzis, Spyros Giatras, Giorgos Theofanous.

=== Terminology ===
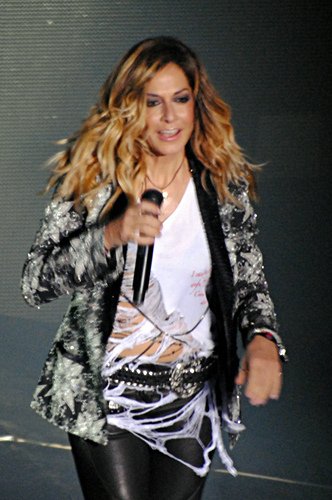
Anna Vissi

In effect, there is no single name for contemporary laïka in the Greek language, but it is often formally referred to as sýnchrono laïkó, a term which is also used for denoting newly composed songs in the tradition of "proper" laïko. The choice of contrasting the notions of "westernized" and "genuine" may often be based on ideological and aesthetic grounds. Laïko interacted more westernized sounds in the late of 2000s. The term modern laïka comes from the phrase "modern songs of the people". (Note: μοντέρνα λαϊκά (τραγούδια), modérna laïká (tragoúdia))

=== Criticism ===
Despite its immense popularity, the genre of contemporary laïka (especially laïko-pop) has come under scrutiny for "featuring musical clichés, average singing voices and slogan-like lyrics" and for "being a hybrid, neither laïkó, nor pop".
