= Zeibekiko =

Greek folk dance

Zeibekiko (Greek: Ζεϊμπέκικο, IPA: [zei̯ˈbeciko]) is a Greek folk dance, similar to the Turkish Zeybek dance.

== Origin and history ==
The dance takes its name from the Zeybeks, an irregular militia who lived in Prousa, and Erythrai in the Ottoman Empire from the late 17th to the early 20th centuries. The dance was first popularised at the end of the 17th century in cities such as Constantinople and Smyrna. Evliya Çelebi mentions in his writings that it was danced in Magnesia and in Aydın at local feasts. Originally a dance for two armed people facing one another, it evolved into an improvised dance for one male performer.

After the population exchange between Greece and Turkey in 1922, the dance became popular in mainland Greece, and was associated with many songs of Laïko music.

== Characteristics ==
The Zeibekiko follows the Byzantine metre, and thus usually has a rhythmic pattern of 9/4, or else 9/8. It is most commonly broken down as:

or as:

As a solo dance, it was traditionally performed exclusively by men, though it is now common for women to dance the Zeibekiko. Due to the movements of the dancer, it is sometimes known as the "dance of the eagle". The dance has no set steps, only certain figures and a circular movement, and often uses elements of the Tsamiko and Kalamatianos. It takes place in an area not surpassing one square metre, and mostly consists of improvised movements. Its exact rhythm differs depending on the time and place the backing song was composed. Originally considered a rebetiko dance, since the 1980s it has been considered a Panhellenic dance which evolves along with the Greek musical tradition. Occasionally dancers perform feats such as standing on a glass of wine or a chair or fireplace, or picking up a table, adding a sense of a little braggadocio and humor.

== See also ==
- Antikristos
- Bouzouki
- Hasapiko
- List of dances
- Kamilierikos
- Zeibekiko of Evdokia
- Zeibeks
