= Aristonicus =

Aristonicus may refer to:

- Aristonicus of Pergamon, who as king became Eumenes III (died 129 BC), and promised freedom to the slaves
- Aristonicus of Alexandria, grammarian and Homeric scholar
- Aristonicus of Carystus, ball-player in Alexander's entourage granted Athenian citizenship
- Aristonicus of Methymnae, 4th-century Lesbian tyrant
- Aristonicus (eunuch), who was brought up with Ptolemy Epiphanes
- Aristonicus of Tarentum, author of a work on mythology
