= Tapeinos horos =

Traditional Greek dance

The Tapeinos horos (Greek: Ταπεινός χορός) is a traditional Greek dance.

The word tapeinos in Greek means "humble", and horos is the Greek word for dance. In many villages in Thrace, this dance is done with slow, humble steps. It is a woman's dance, with simple and slow steps. It is the first dance done after the wedding ceremony, led by the bride.

== See also ==
- Greek music
- Greek dances
- Tsamiko
- Hasapiko or makellarios
- Pentozali
- Sousta
- Greek folk music
