= Dance of Osman Taka =

Traditional dance in Albania and Greece

The Dance of Osman Taka (Albanian: Vallja Çame e Osman Takës; Greek: Οσμαντάκας or Σαμαντάκας) is a traditional dance in Albania and Greece. In Albania it is mainly danced by Cham Albanians. The dance bears the name of Osman Taka, a 19th-century Cham Albanian guerrilla fighter who fought against Ottoman forces. It is a famous variation from the Albanian Cham repertoire of the older Çamçe dance.

== Background ==
Osman Taka was jailed in Yanina and was sentenced to death. When he was asked to give his final wish, he wanted to dance. The folk tradition says that his dance was so beautiful that the local Albanian gendarmes of the Ottoman army, did not execute him. After some days he was caught again and was killed in Konispol while fighting against Ottoman authorities .

== Performance ==
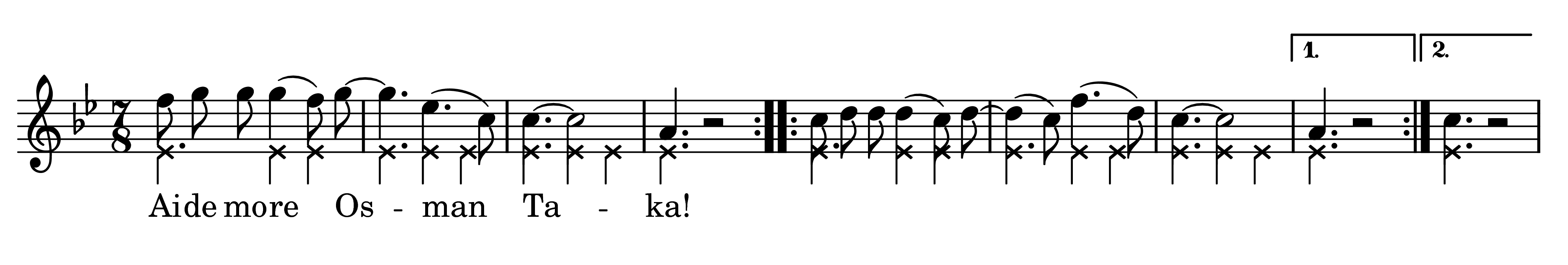
Osman Taka Dance

The dance follows a strict tempo with emphasis in the "attitude, style and grace" of the dancer. It is a 2/4 meter with steps "slow-quick-quick". The dance is a row dance, with a lead dancer performing skillfully executed steps. He then drops to his knees, arches his back and extends his chest upward, forming a bridge. The other dancers then step forward onto the lead dancer's stomach and dance on top of his stomach. The dancers hold each other from the hands, bend 90 degrees upwards at the elbows. It takes a sturdy hand, especially if you are supporting the first or last person of the line. This symbolizes the strength and centrality of the lead dancer as he forms a bridge with his body for the other men to cross over.

== In Albania and Greece ==
The dance is part of the repertoire of Epirote music in Greece and of the Cham music in Albania. The Dance of Osman Taka is a Cham dance well known throughout Albania and has been performed at some number of national occasions.

=== Albania ===
The dance is performed alongside instrumental accompaniment of lute, violin, tambourine with clarinet alongside vocals. It is famous variation from the Albanian Cham repertoire of the older Çamçe dance.

=== Greece ===
In Greece the dance is called "Osmantakas" or "Samantakas" and it is danced in Epirus. It is one of nine basic dancing genres (the other being Tsamikos, Syrtos in 3 steps, Syrtos in 2 steps, Pogonisios, Zagorisios, Kleftes, Fezodervenagas, Berati) of Epirus. The Osmantakas dancing genre has its distinct dancing style, it's exclusively danced in the correspondent song and it's not to be confused with any other dancing genre in Epirus. Apart from the traditional 8-measure motif, today it is also performed in a 4-measure motif, very similar to the Pogonios. In the typical fashion in the music of Epirus the specific song may sometimes be interrupted at the end and end up in Syrtos or Tsamikos rhythm. A general classification of the dancing genres in Zagori region of Epirus can classify Osmanatakas, as well as the Berati, Kleftes, Perdikomata, as variations of Tsamiko. This dance is supposed to have been the dance of the Souliotes. The dance of Osman Taka |url=https://dmpp.org/the-dance-of-osman-taka/|

== See also ==
- Tsamiko
- Dance of Zalongo
- Cham Albanians
