= List of programs broadcast by CyBC =

The following is a list of programs broadcast by CyBC or RIK (Cyprus Broadcasting Corporation) television stations. CybC was the only Cypriot television network before the launches of ANT1 (in 1993), Mega (Logos TV until 1999), and Sigma (in 1995).

== Animated ==
- Arthur! and the Square Knights of the Round Table
- Pingu

== Children's Programmes ==
- Gela Hamogela (RIK-2)
- Palamakia (RIK-2)
- Stin Hora tou Giati (RIK-2)
- To Kokkino Leoforeio (RIK-2)

== Talk shows ==
- Apo Mera Se Mera (RIK-1)
- Ora Kyprou (RIK-1)

== Dramas ==
- Epikindyni Zoni (RIK-1)
- Genies tis Siopis (RIK-1)
- Roda tis Orgis (RIK-1)

== Weekly TV shows ==
- 7 meres Kypros
- Aktualite, in Turkish
- Dialogoi
- H Kypros konta sas
- Kypros - Evropi
- Oikomikos kathreftis
- Prizma, in Turkish
- Proektaseis
- Sto Proskinio

== News, sports and morning programs ==
- Alpha News from Greece, (RIK-1)
- Athlitikes Eikones, sports (RIK-2)
- Epta me deka, morning program (RIK-1)
- Fasis & Goal, sports (RIK-2)
- RIK1 News in Greek, (RIK-1)
- RIK2 News in English, Greek and Turkish, (RIK-2)

== Special events ==
- Eurovision Song Contest
- Junior Eurovision Song Contest
