= Tsakonikos =

Type of dance

The Tsakonikos or Tsakonikos horos (Greek: Τσακώνικος χορός "Tsakonian dance") is a dance performed in the Peloponnese in Greece. It comes from the region, chiefly in Arcadia, known as Tsakonia. It is danced in many towns and villages there with little variation to the steps.

In Ayios Andreas, it is performed as a mixed dance in an open circle, with the hands held up (αγκαζέ angaze, in Greek). The most popular songs for the tsakonikos are "Sou ipa mana kale mana" and "Kinisan ta tsamopoula".

The dance is performed to a 5/4 (3+2) rhythm in an open circle which slowly winds in upon itself, forming a snail-shaped design. This labyrinthine formation is, according to legend, linked to the Crane dance of Theseus in Greek mythology, who slew the Minotaur in the Labyrinth of King Minos. It has also been linked to the slaying by Apollo of the Python at Delphi.

== Lyrics to Kinisan ta tsamopoula (ΚΙΝΗΣΑΝΤΑ) ==
Κινῆσαν τὰ - κι ἀμὰν ἀμάν.

Κινῆσαν τὰ - τσανόπουλα.

Κινῆσαν τὰ τσανόπουλα κι’ ὅλα τὰ λεβεντόπουλα.

Καὶ πάν’ στὸν πὲ - κι ἀμὰν ἀμάν,

καὶ πάν’ στὸν πέρα Μαχαλά.

Καὶ πᾶν’ στὸν πέρα Μαχαλά, ποὺ εἶν

τὰ κορίτσια τὰ καλά.

Κι ἐκεῖ τους πιὰ - κι ἀμὰν ἀμάν,

κι ἐκεῖ τους πιάνει μία βροχή.

Κι ἐκεῖ τους πιάνει μία βροχή, μία σιγανή, μία ταπεινή.

Βραχήκανε κι ἀμὰν ἀμάν,

βραχήκανε τὰ τσάμικα καὶ τ' ἄσπρα τους πουκάμισα.

Μάστε κορὶ - κι ἀμὰν ἀμὰν

μάστε κορίτσια τσάκαλα.

Μάστε κορίτσια τσάκαλα, στεγνῶστε τὰ πουκάμισα

(figurative translation)

So they went, the Tsakon youth

So went the Tsakon youth and all the lads

And off they go - aman aman

And off they go to yonder Mahala, where

the girls are fine

And there they were caught in - aman aman

And there they were caught in a rain

And there they were caught in a rain, a slow, a shy (rain)

They were soaked - aman aman

Soaked were their tsamika (dances) and their white shirts

Girls, gather - aman aman

Girls, gather quick

Girls, gather quick, (to) dry their shirts.

== See also ==
- Greek music
- Greek dances
- Tsamiko
- Sirtaki
- Kalamatianos
- Dora Stratou
