= Music of Epirus (Greece) =

The music of Epirus (Greek: Μουσική της Ηπείρου), in Epirus, northwestern Greece, present to varying degree in the rest of Greece and the islands, contains folk songs that are mostly pentatonic and polyphonic, characterized as relaxed, gentle and exceptionally beautiful, and sung by both male and female singers.

Distinctive songs include lament songs (mirolóyia), shepherd's songs (skáros) and drinking songs (tis távlas). The clarinet is the most prominent folk instrument in Epirus, used to accompany dances, mostly slow and heavy, like the menousis, fisouni, podhia, syrtos sta dyo (pogonisios), syrtos sta tria, zagorisios, kentimeni, koftos, yiatros and tsamikos. Other instruments used are violin, floghera and sterianó laouto. Notable composers include clarinist Petroloukas Chalkias and laouto player Vasilis Kostas.

The polyphonic song of Epirus constitutes one of the most interesting musical forms, not only for the east Mediterranean and the Balkans, but also for the worldwide repertoire of the folk polyphony like the yodeling of Switzerland. Besides its scale, what attests to its very old origin is its vocal, collective, rhetorical and modal character.

The corresponding dances are slow and stately; they are invariably danced in counter-clockwise circles. Women's dances are especially noble, allowing for a minimum of leg and arm movement, and calling for formal traditional attire: ankle-length black coats, gold thread tuques with a single long tassel, and hammered gold jewellery.
