= Ntames =

Cretan folk dance from Rethymno, Greece

Ntames (Greek: ντάμες), is a Cretan folk dance from Rethymno, Greece. It is very widespread in Crete. It is danced by couples.

== See also ==
- Music of Greece
- Greek dances
