= Antipatitis =

Greek folk dance

Antipatitis (Greek: αντιπατητής) is a form of a Greek folk dance from Greek island Karpathos, Greece.

== See also ==
- Music of Greece
- Greek dances
