= Zaramo (dance) =

Macedonian dance

Zaramo (Macedonian Зарамо) is a popular shoulder-hold dance in North Macedonia and also in Macedonia (Greece), in the region around Florina.

The dance begins with a step toward the center on the left foot while dragging the right foot forward. Men bring the right knee forward into a lift. Women lift the right leg only slightly off the ground. The lift is followed by a step-behind-step figure moving in the line of direction. In North Macedonia and its diaspora communities, when danced with a line of only men, the dance may evolve into a more difficult dance known as Teshkoto. In the Florina region of Macedonia, Zaramo often segues directly into an up-tempo dance known as Hasapiko, in which men perform intricate, syncopated hops and steps danced almost in place.
