= Koutsos =

The Koutsos (Greek: Κουτσός) is a folk dance from Didymoteicho, Greece. It is very widespread in Macedonia and Thrace.

== See also ==
- Music of Greece
- Greek dances
