= Karsilamas =

Type of dance

External videos
- Bana Derler Fındık Kurdu(Karşılama)
- Karsilamas
- Koşa Koşa Coşa Coşa Geldim Dostlar Ben Bu Meydana(Karşılama)
- Dalin vajzat prej mejtepit(Karşılama)
- Hammamîzâde İsmail Dede Efendi - Benliyi Aldım Kaçaktan
- Orkestar Zornitsa - Lazarsko horo
- Beyaz - Yüksek Yüksek Tepelere
- Ulvi Cemal Erkin-Köçekçe
- RITMO KARSILAMA

Karsilamas (Turkish: karşılama; Greek: καρσιλαμάς) is a folk dance spread all over Northwest Turkey and carried to Greece by Anatolian Greek immigrants. The term "karşılama" means "encounter, welcoming, greeting" in Turkish. The dance is popular in Northwestern areas of Turkey, especially on wedding parties and festivals.

This dance is also found in many areas of Greece, such as the Aegean islands (Syros, Kythnos, Lesvos, etc.) as well as in Thrace and Macedonia.

Apart from Karsilamas, in Greece and Cyprus there is a similar dance named Antikrystos. Antikrystos, translates also, as "anti-face", i.e., face-to-face.

Karsilamas is a couple dance that is still danced in what was the Ottoman Empire, from Persia to Serbia, and in the Macedonia and Thrace regions of Northern Greece.

Figures of the dance may vary from region to region, but the main theme is two people face each other, and music rhythmically controls their next moves. Traditionally, people dance without any figure on their minds, just figures they have seen from their elders.

The meter is 9/8, and the basic move is danced in four small steps with durations 2+2+2+3, respectively. The style and mood (bouncy, smooth, lively, etc.) vary depending on the region.

Cyprus Antikrystos - Καρσιλαμαδες, Rumeli Balkan karsilamas, Thrace (Greece) Antikrystos, Merzifon Karsılaması, Edirne Karsılaması, Komotini (Greece) Karsilamas - Aptalikos, Giresun Karsılaması, Taraklı Karsılaması, Bilecik Karsılaması, Old Karsilamas (Παληός Καρσιλαμάς), Pigi Karsilama (Πιγκί), Ayşe Karsilama (İskender boğazı) (Αϊσέ) (Η Αγάπη Είναι Καρφίτσα), (Aptalikos Karsilamas (Απτάλικος), Asia Minor Karsilamas (Melinos karsilamas), Mastika.

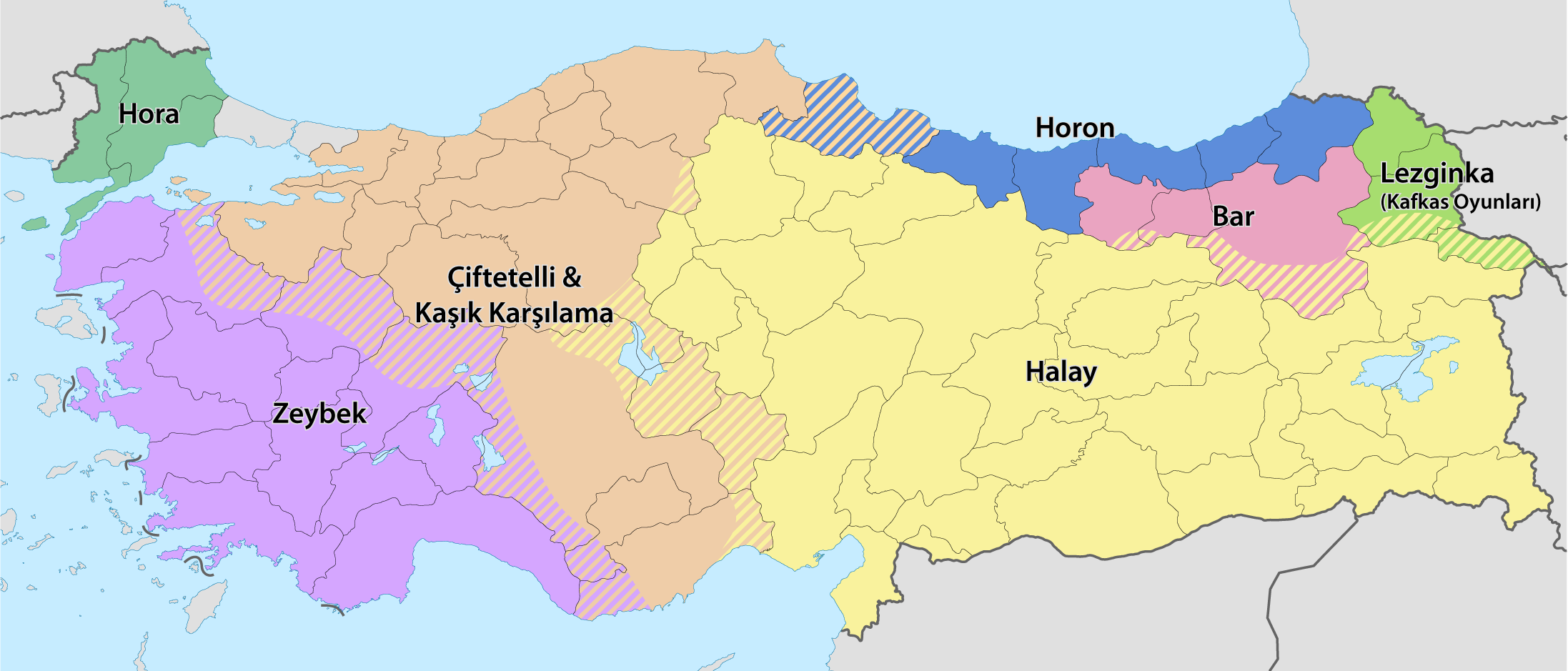
Extension and distribution of folk dances in today’s Turkey.

== Kanto ==
Kanto was heavily influenced by musical theatre, Balkan and Byzantine or Anatolian music (Karsilamas) (which was however often a subject of satire in kanto songs).

== Köçekçe ==
The kyuchek (köçekçe), as a common musical form in the Balkans (primarily Bulgaria and North Macedonia), is typically a dance with a 9/8 time signature; two variant forms have the beats divided 2+2+2+3 and 2+2+3+2. (This latter meter is sometimes referred to as "gypsy 9".)

== Entarisi ala benziyor ==
Entarisi ala benziyor (Turkish: Entarisi ala benziyor),(Greek: Αραμπάς περνά(Arabas perna)), (Greek: Δημητρούλα μου(Dimitrula mou)), (Greek: Το Μαρουλιώ(Maroulio)),(Albanian: Lule malësore), (Armenian: Aman Ağavni) is a form of the Balkan folk dance karşılama. Entarisi ala benziyor is a folk dance spread all over Greece, Turkey, Armenia and Albania. The meter is 9/8, and the basic move is danced in four small steps with durations 2, 3, 2 and 2 respectively.

== See also ==
- Greece, Antikrystos
- Greece, Kamilierikos
- Suleiman Aga (dance)
- Pontic Greek folk dance
