= Lafina =

Greek folk dance

Lafina (Greek: λαφίνα) is a form of a Greek folk dance from Thessaly, Greece. It is very similar to syrtos.

== See also ==
- Music of Greece
- Greek dances
