= Bougatsas =

Bougatsas (Greek: Μπουγατσάς), is a kind of a Greek folk dance from the city of Florina, Macedonia, Greece. It is danced in pairs.

== See also ==
- Music of Greece
- Greek dances
