= Ntournerakia =

Cretan folk dance from Rethymno, Greece

Ntournerakia (Greek: ντουρνεράκια), is a Cretan folk dance from Rethymno, Greece. It is based on the Greek folk dance "chasaposervikos" and is widespread in Crete. The name comes from the song "Ntournerakia", by Kostas Mountakis.

== See also ==
- Music of Greece
- Greek dances
- Link to the tune and song Ntournerakia
