= Angaliastos =

Type of dance

Angaliastos (Greek: αγκαλιαστός), is a kind of Greek folk dance from Crete, Greece. It is very widespread in Crete and Greek islands, too. It is called angaliastos which means "hugged", because it gives the opportunity for young people of island, to embrace the partner girls, with which they used to dance.

== See also ==
- Music of Greece
- Greek dances
