= Nizamikos =

Nizamikos is a Greek dance of Naoussa for men which is danced with handle of the hands with palms bent their struggles.

The Nizamikos danced every year at the carnival of Naoussa is called "Janissaries and Boules". It owes its name to the Nizam, Turkish armed tax collectors whom Naoussa trying to appease with this dance and glitoooun hike.

== See also ==
- Music of Greece
- Greek dances
