= Katsabadianos =

Katsabadianos (Greek: Κατσαμπαδιανός), is a folk dance with Cretan origin. It is very widespread in Heraklion and Chania.

== See also ==
- Music of Greece
- Greek dances
