= Lipothymiarikos =

Lipothymiarikos or Horos tis Nifis (Greek Λιποθυμιάρικος or Χορός της νύφης) is a dance done in the early hours of the morning at a wedding reception. It is only danced by men. The dance is made up of two parts the first being danced by all dancers in the steps of a Syrto Sta Dio, the second part is only done by the leader, under a free melody, he pretends to faint (mimicking a bride who has fainted). The rest of the group tries to bring him to, when the music changes the leader jumps up and starts to dance again with the Syrtos Sta Dio. This is repeated two or three times, in some cases water is thrown on the leader who pretends to have fainted, or they may even slap him in a joking manner.

== See also ==
- Greek dances
