= Osman Taka =

Albanian dancer

Osman Taka (died 1887) was a Cham Albanian dancer and unclear personage from 19th century. The Dance of Osman Taka is named after him. His early life is not clear. He belongs to the Taka clan of Filiates, also known for Alush Taka, an Albanian patriot.
According to narrative sources, his name became well-known during the mid 19th century. He was probably a kachak or klepht fighting the Ottomans in Chameria region. Other sources connect him with the Albanian National Awakening of late 19th century. While local Cham stories claim him to be an outlaw who came in conflict with the Ottoman authorities. The tale claims that he was jailed in Ioannina. When he was asked to give his final wish, he wanted to dance. The folk tradition says that his dance was so beautiful that the local gendarmes of the Ottoman Army, did not execute him. After some days he was caught again and was killed in Konispol.
