= Maniatikos =

Greek folk dance

Maniatikos (Greek: Μανιάτικος), is a local Greek folk dance from Mani, Greece, with a 2/4 rhythm meter.

== See also ==
- Music of Greece
- Greek dances
