= Stamoulo =

Stamoulo (Greek: Σταμούλω) is a Greek dance from Aridaia, a former municipality of Pella, Greece. It is a wedding dance that is performed by the couples and their relatives.

== See also ==
- Music of Greece
- Greek dances
