= Kanella =

Greek folk dance

Kanella (Greek: Κανέλλα), is a Cretan folk dance from Rethymno, Greece. It is very widespread in Crete. It is danced in a circle and is a variation to the siganos dance. The name of the dance is derived from the song.

== See also ==
- Music of Greece
- Greek dances
