= Kerkiraikos =

Greek folk dance

Kerkiraikos (Greek: Κερκυραϊκός), also called Rouga and Perdika, is a form of a Greek folk dance from the island of Corfu. The dance consists of 12 steps and has many similarities with the Greek dance Kalamatianos.

== See also ==
- Music of Greece
- Greek dances
