= Kapitan Louka =

Kapetan Louka or Kapitan Louka (Greek: Καπετάν Λουκάς) is a dance from the region of Macedonia in Greece. It is a dance specifically from the area of Kozani. The dance is named after a freedom fighter in Macedonia, Loukas Kokkinos born in Grevena.

== See also ==
- Greek dances
- Greek music
