= Metsovitikos (dance) =

Type of dance

Metsovitikos (Greek: Μετσοβίτικος xoρός) is a kind of a local folk dance from Metsovo, Greece.

== See also ==
- Music of Greece
- Greek dances
