= Tranos Choros =

Greek folk dance

Tranos Choros (Greek: Τρανός Χορός) is a form of a Greek folk dance from Kozani, Greece.

== See also ==
- Music of Greece
- Greek dances
