= Sianos =

Sianos is a Greek dance meant to open festivities or social gatherings. Sianos is also known on the island of Karpathos as Kato Horos (Κατω Χορος). The men start off the dance and the women eventually join in. The dancers hold hands in a basket weave (cross) formation. The leader and last dancer is always male. The time signature is in 2/4. There are six steps to the dance, which is similar to the Sta Tria.
