= Zervos =

Zervos is a surname. Notable people with the surname include:

- Christian Zervos (1889–1970), French writer
- Kevin Zervos (born 1953), Hong Kong judge
- Komninos Zervos (born 1950), Greek poet
- Mihail Zervos, Greek financial mathematician
- Pantelis Zervos (1913–1991), Greek actor
- Skevos Zervos (1875–1966), Greek professor
- Summer Zervos, Apprentice contestant

== See also ==
- Zervos (dance), Greek folk-dance
