= Gerontikos =

Gerontikos (Greek: γεροντικός) is the Greek name for the traditional Starsko Oro (Slavic) dance of the Florina region of Greece. Both names translate as the “old men’s dance.” Although this traditional men’s dance is rarely danced recreationally anymore, it is frequently performed on stage by Florina’s dance groups. It is a dance that begins with very slow, deliberate steps and later often segues into the more up-tempo Leventikos, or Pusteno (Slavic). The step pattern is structurally related to Berance, a dance just across the border in the Republic of Macedonia. Two traditional Slavic Macedonian ballads with bandit themes dating back to the years of Ottoman rule in the Balkans, Ibraim Odza and Dafino Vino Crveno, are commonly played instrumentally for stage performances of the Gerondikos by Greek dance organizations. The poetic meter of these ballads may be the determining factor for their unusual 12/8 (alternating measures of 7 and 5) musical meter and its variants.

== See also ==
- Music of Greece
- Greek dances
- Greek folk music
