= Apanomeritis =

Greek folk dance

Apanomeritis (Greek: απανωμερίτης) is a kind of Greek folk dance from Crete, Greece. It was mainly performed at some regions of Central Crete, such as Rethymno and Heraklion until shortly after the war. It is also called provatinistikos (sheep dance) due to the fact that the dancers stamp their feet on the ground, like sheep do when they get nervous.

Nowadays apanomeritis is mainly dance by women, but earlier it was a mixed dance. During the dance, mantinades were a big part of the lyrics.

Apanomeritis has a musical meter of two quarters, consists of ten steps and the grip from the palms is with the hands crossed down. It is danced in a circle.
