= Byzantine dance =

Dance during Byzantine Empire

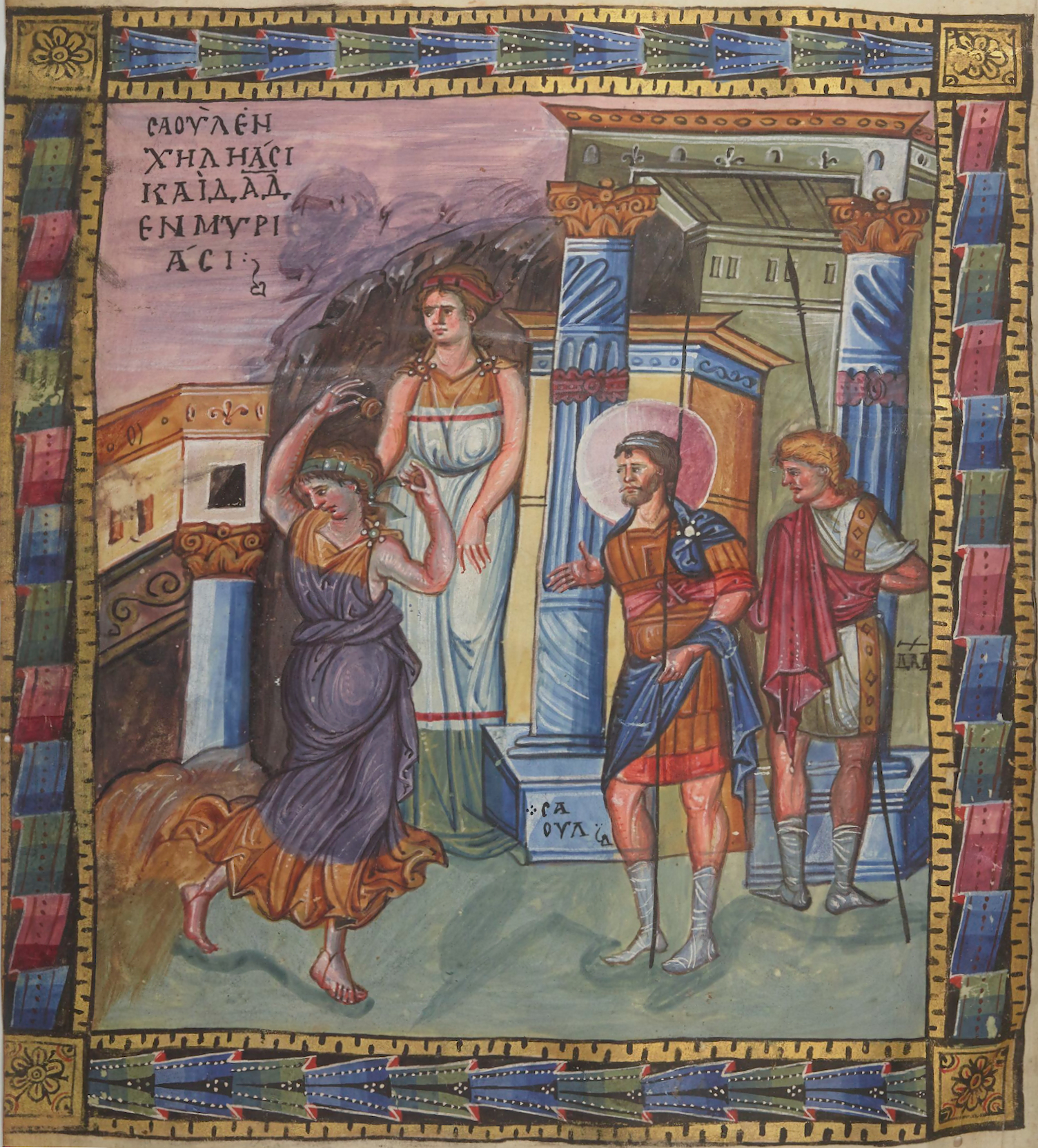
David glorified by the women of Israel, an example of Byzantine dance from the Paris Psalter manuscript.

Byzantine dance developed during the periods of Late Antiquity and the Middle Ages, was centered in the capital city of Byzantium, later renamed Constantinople. Byzantine culture was oriented towards Greek culture and Christianity, rather than Roman paganism, in development of the arts. The Byzantine Empire existed for more than a thousand years, from the 4th century AD to 1453.

== History ==
Ancient Greek dance in classical antiquity was originally held to have educational value, as Plato's dialogues on this point evidence in the Laws. However, as Greek culture gradually conquered Rome, dancing had less educational value and was more for entertainment purposes. At this time dancers were given a lower social status than other artists.

The influence of Christianity brought change too, first as the Eastern Roman Empire sought to ban dance and condemned it for its pagan origins. However, as the Eastern Orthodox Church gradually began to grant concessions to the vast number of Greeks who had converted to Christianity, rendering dance acceptable by refining and spiritualizing it. This was similar to Christian reinterpretations of pre-Christian holidays, legends, and symbols.

There are also similarities between Byzantine dance and modern Greek dance.

== Dance types ==
The dances that won the approval of the church were group dances, typically processions or circles in which men, separated from women, performed solemn decorous movements. However, the information on dancing at this period is very scarce. Actually, since the Byzantine art is mainly ecclesiastical, the references to dance are rare. Some images from the Byzantine and meta-Byzantine dances have been saved on sculptures, miniatures, and manuscripts – but mainly in church frescos amongst religious subjects.

In his book Life and Culture of the Byzantines, Phaidon Koukoules assembled all known references to dance in texts of that time. From his writings, we learn that there were women's dances on Easter, nocturnal satirical dances in disguise on the Kalends, dances by itinerant bands of young men on the Roussalia. There were dances at weddings, in taverns, and at banquets. The wealthy invited professional harpists and youths and maidens to dance, being especially appreciated for their bodily agility and deft footwork. Dance spectacles staged in the theater in the accompaniment of flute and guitar were also mentioned.

Though we have so few descriptions of Byzantine dances, we know that they were often 'intertwined'. The leader of the dance was called the koryphaios (κορυφαίος) or chorolektes (χορολέκτης) and it was he who began the song and made sure that the circle was maintained.

Efstathios of Thessaloniki mentions a dance which commenced in a circle and ended with the dancers facing one another. When not dancing in a circle the dancers held their hands high or waved them to left and right. They held cymbals (very like the zilia of today) or a kerchief in their hands and their movements were emphasized by their long sleeves. As they danced, they sang, either set songs or extemporized ones, sometimes in unison, sometimes in refrain, repeating the verse sung by the lead dancer. The onlookers joined in, clapping the rhythm or singing. Professional singers, often the musicians themselves, composed lyrics to suit the occasion.

In Constantinople, important events were celebrated with large public dances. On the return of the victorious Byzantine army, for instance, the citizens thronged the streets, danced with the soldiers and shouted in jubilation. There are instances recorded of people dancing inside the church, on Easter and Christmas, after Patriarch Theophylactos had granted his permission.

Other times they danced and sang extemporized songs, making fun of the emperor. The soldiers danced as part of their drill and danced after maneuvers for amusement. The charioteers danced in the Hippodrome when they won their races and, the sailors danced an unmanly dance, full of twists and turns, as if imitating the spirals of the labyrinth.

=== Popular dances ===
Byzantine dances in popular culture included:

- Syrtos (Συρτός; literally "dragged dance")
- Geranos (Γερανός or Αγέρανος "circle dance")
- Mantilia (Μαντίλια or Μαντήλια "kerchiefs")
- Saximos (Σάξιμος)
- Pyrrichios (Πυρρίχιος or Πυρρίχη "war dance")

=== Court dances ===
At the height of the Empire, court life "passed in a sort of ballet", with precise ceremonies prescribed for every occasion, to show that "Imperial power could be exercised in harmony and order", and "the Empire could thus reflect the motion of the Universe as it was made by the Creator", according to the Emperor Constantine Porphyrogenitus, who wrote a Book of Ceremonies describing in enormous detail the annual round of the Court.

Special forms of dress for many classes of people on particular occasions are set down; at the name-day dinner for the Emperor or Empress various groups of officials performed ceremonial dances, one group wearing "a blue and white garment, with short sleeves, and gold bands, and rings on their ankles. In their hands they hold what are called phengia". The second group do just the same, but wearing "a garment of green and red, split, with gold bands". These colours were the marks of the old chariot-racing factions, the four now merged to just the Blues and the Greens, and incorporated into the official hierarchy.

Some dance historians imagine that these court dances by high officials were more like a restrained "stylized walk". However, enamel plaques on the Monomachus Crown, sent by the Byzantine Emperor to Hungary in about 1050, show courtly women dancing, with their hands over their head and one leg pulled back sharply behind them. They are shown waving long strips of fabric above their heads, such as when 'skipping rope'.

== Instruments ==
Instruments in Byzantine music for dance included:

- Organon
- Single, double, or multiple flute
- Sistrum (Σείστρον, "tambourine, instrument with bells")
- Timpani (Τυμπάνι, "drum")
- Psaltirio (Ψαλτήρι(ο)ν, "psalter")
- Lyre (Λύρα)
- Keras (Κέρας, "horn")
- Kanonaki (Κανονάκι)

== See also ==
- Byzantine music
- Greek dances
