= Lambri Kamara =

Lambri Kamara (Greek: Λαμπρή Καμάρα) is a form of a Greek folk dance from Megara, Attika, Greece.

== See also ==
- Music of Greece
- Greek dances
