= Proskinitos =

Type of dance

Proskinitos is a form of a Greek folk dance from Macedonia, Greece.

== See also ==
- Music of Greece
- Greek dances
