= Poustseno =

Poustseno Greek: Πουστσένο Macedonian language Пуштено", Pushteno, meaning "to let go" is a traditional Macedonian dance from Florina, Western Macedonia Greece. It is danced in the area of Florina by the Slav Macedonians as well as Greek Macedonians, and is also known with the Greek name of "Lytos" (Greek: λυτός).

== See also ==
- Music of Greece
- Greek dances
