= Makrinitsa dance =

Makrinitsa dance (Greek: ο χορός της μακρυνίτσας), is Greek traditional dance from Naousa, Greece. It is a female dance and is connected with the Greek war of independence.

== See also ==
- Music of Greece
- Greek dances
