= Sperveri =

Sperveri is a dance done at the wedding on the island of Rhodes. It is sung and danced as part of the dressing of the bridal bed. The sperveri refers to the ornate covering of the bridal bed. It is a women's dance. The dance is also accompanied by a song with the title έστολισαν το σπερβερι.
