= Bathyllus =

Bathyllus (Ancient Greek: Βάθυλλος) was a dancer/performer of pantomimus in Rome during the period of Augustus. Born in Alexandria, he was the favorite and lover of Maecenas.

He is often described with the performer Pylades, who was seen as the epitome of tragic performance, while Bathyllus was seen as the epitome of comedic performance. They were both former slaves and they are both credited with having modernized pantomime in Rome, adding different forms of dance which are often described as erotic. Each founded a school and had some political influence in Rome occasionally leading to their supporters clashing in the streets.

According to Juvenal, a pantomime named Bathyllus, dancing, provoked Roman matrons to a state of sexual frenzy. Bathyllus appears in the illustrated edition of Juvenal's satire 'Against Women' by Aubrey Beardsley.

References to Bathyllus are found in the writing of many ancient writers, including Horace (epode 14), who describes him as the lover of Polycrates the Tyrant and the author of the Anacreontea, who described him in his 22nd ode.
