= Isios =

Isios is a folk dance on Kalymnos Green

The Isios Horos (meaning straight dance) as it is called by the locals is done at social gatherings and festivals. It is danced in an open circle by both men and women. The rhythm is 2/4 and the hand hold is in a basket weave (crossed) formation. Only the leader improvises on the steps of the dance, the rest of the dancers follow through with the basic step.
