= Ta Xila =

Ta Xila is a song played for a traditional couple dance on the island of Lesvos. Played on santouri (cimbalom), it can be done as a syrto dance by a couple, and in groups of four. It is particularly popular at weddings and social gatherings.

According to oral tradition, the four-beat instrumental song was created as a working song, based on a Turkish patinada.
