= Giknas =

- Genre: folk dance
- Origin: Orestiada

Giknas is a folk dance from Orestiada in Thrace. The dance name is derived from the color nail polish used by the women at the wedding. The dance is done on the Saturday night prior to the wedding. Each guest leads the dance and offers a small gift to the bridal couple, usually in the form of money.
