= Dionysiakos =

Dance

Dionysiakos (Greek: Διονυσιακός Χορός) is a form of Greek dance and customs from ancient Greece. Dionysiakos and its forms are revived today in many areas of Greece like Peloponnese, central Greece, Thessaly and Crete with the best-known being the Phallus festival in the area of Tyrnavos, Larissa.

It is a pagan fertility festival in honor of the god of Mount Olympus, Dionysus with customs and activities based on the religion in ancient Greece and is one of the most famous worldwide.

== See also ==
- Greek music
