= Isos Sinasos =

Isos Sinasos is a characteristic dance of the region and area. Like many other dances from Asia Minor, this one is done only by women. This dance is executed in a particular style only known in Sinasos.

Isos is danced by women in pairs. The steps are the same as Varasos' dance of handkerchiefs and spoons. The women moved to the beat and rhythm through their hands and arms. The special hand gesture used by the women, was to join the three fingers together, representing the Holy Trinity. The emphasis of the dance was always on one leg and waist swings were allowed left and right. Many times onlookers to the dance would clap hands, sing along to the songs, young men also shouted various comments to distract and taunt the women. It was a dance that connected community. More close reference to Kyriakos Vlasiadis work on the dances from this region can be explored in Greek.
