= Aristonicus of Tarentum =

Ancient Greek writer

Aristonicus (Latin; Greek Ἀριστόνικος Aristonikos) of Tarentum was the author of a work on Greek mythology which ancient sources often refer to. He is perhaps the same as the one mentioned by Athenaeus 1.20, but nothing is known about him.
