= Rougatsiarikos =

Type of dance

Rougatsiarikos (Greek: ρουγκατσιάρικος) is a kind of a Greek traditional dance from Thessaly, Greece.

== See also ==
- Music of Greece
- Greek dances
