= Vayia Strose kai Louloudia =

Type of Greek dance from the Island of Samos

Vayia Strose kai Louloudia (Βάγια στρώστε και λουλούδια "lay bay leaves and flowers") is a dance from the Island of Samos. It is similar in style to the Syrtos dance. Its name is derived from a famous Samian Poet named Sideris Zisimou.

It is done during the Apokries on the island and at other social gatherings. The dancers form two lines in the circle and move into one line, then into two again at various intervals of the song.
