= Dora Stratou =

Greek actress and choreographer (1903–1988)

- Dora Stratou. She issued one of the largest series of folk music in the world: 50 records
- Born: Dorothea Stratou; 1903; Athens, Greece
- Died: 20 January 1988 (aged 84–85); Athens, Greece
- Occupation: Folkorist
- Writing career
- Period: 1953–1988
- Genres: Dance, Music
- Subjects: Greek dances, Greek folk music
- Notable works: Greek Dances - a Living Link to the Antiquity; Traditional Greek Dances; A Tradition, an Adventure
- Website: www.grdance.org

Dora Stratou (born Dorothea Stratou; Greek: Δωροθέα (Δόρα) Στράτου; 1903–1988) was a Greek actress and choreographer, with significant contributions to Greek Folk Dancing and Greek Folk Music. She issued one of the largest series of folk music in the world, with 50 records, and is the founder of the Greek Dances Theatre "Dora Stratou".

Her parents Maria Koromila and Nikolaos Stratos brought her up in the upper class urban environment of Athens at the beginning of the twentieth century, along with her brother Andreas Stratos.

Dora Stratou wrote the book Greek Traditional Dances in 1979. It was printed by the Greek Educational Books Organisation in Athens 1979. She worked with Simon Karras and other ethnomusicologists. She maintained a record of traditions, recorded music, filmed dancers, interviewed villagers on dance topics, costumes, folklore, etc.

In her book she begins with the quote: "I write what my eyes have seen, what went through my mind and what my soul fell in love with..." Her interest in Greek Dance led her to establish The Greek Dances Theatre in Athens. This theatre group dances the regional dances in Greece in the same way as they were done hundreds of years ago, and the dancers continue to wear traditional costumes.

The Greek Dances theater is nowadays a host for other folkloric groups both within Greece and Internationally. The President's office of the International Dance Council CID UNESCO is also run from the main offices of the Dora Stratou Theatre in Plaka.

== Filmography ==
Year	Title	Role	Notes	Ref
1927	Promithefs desmotis	Dancer		
1935	Afti einai i zoi			
1961	Tintin and the Golden Fleece	Danseurs et musiciens folkloriques		
1967	The Day the Fish Came Out	Travel Agent	(final film role)	

== Gallery ==
Logo of Greek Dances-Dora Stratou Society
