= Simeriani =

Song and dance

Simeris/Simeriani (Greek: σήμερις or σημεριανή) is a popular song and dance from Sinasos, Cappadocia. The dance is a typical improvisation on many of the circular dances from the area. The dancers move towards the right of the circle and towards the center. The dance is done by women.

== Lyrics (in Greek) ==
Σήμερις η σημεριανή δεν μοιάζει σαν τις άλλες σήμερις η σημεριανή δεν μοιάζει σαν τις άλλες,

χορεύουν Σινασίτισσες κι έχουμ’ χαρές μεγάλες χορεύουν Σινασίτισσες κι έχουμ’ χαρές μεγάλες.

Αγάπη μ’ έλα έλα και μην το λες κανένα, αγάπη μ’ το όνομά σου γλυκό ‘ν’ το φίλημά σου.

Σήκωσ’ το σαρικάκι σου και μην το χαμηλώνεις σήκωσ’ το σαρικάκι σου και μην το χαμηλώνεις,

το ξέρω πως με αγαπάς και δεν το φανερώνεις το ξέρω πως με αγαπάς και δεν το φανερώνεις.

Αγάπη μ’ έλα έλα και μην το λες κανένα, αγάπη μ’ το όνομά σου γλυκό ‘ν’ το φίλημά σου.

Στη Σινασό είν’ ‘να δεντρί που βγάζει τ’ ανασόνι στη Σινασό είν’ ‘να δεντρί που βγάζει τ’ ανασόνι,

πολλές κοπέλες φίλησα καμιά δεν είπε σώνει πολλές κοπέλες φίλησα καμιά δεν είπε σώνει.

Αγάπη μ’ έλα έλα και μην το λες κανένα, αγάπη μ’ το όνομά σου γλυκό ‘ν’ το φίλημά σου.

Βάλε στο μαστραπά νερό και βάλτο στον αγέρα βάλε στο μαστραπά νερό και βάλτο στον αγέρα,

κι αν δεν το πιούμ’ την Κυριακή το πίνουμ’ τη Δευτέρα κι αν δεν το πιούμ’ την Κυριακή το πίνουμ’ τη Δευτέρα.

Αγάπη μ’ έλα έλα και μην το λες κανένα, αγάπη μ’ το όνομά σου γλυκό ‘ν’ το φίλημά σου.
