= Fisounis =

Type of Greek dance

Fisounis is a Greek dance. Kostas Mitsis who has researched the dances of Preveza and Epirus writes the following about the dance Fisounis: "The Dance Fisouni is from the area of Preveza and is believed to have been brought to the region from Constantinople. The name comes from the characteristic moves of the women's dress as they dance, when women dance the Fisouni, it is like wind blowing.' Fisoun means to a strong wind."
