= Plataniotiko Nero =

Plataniotiko Nero is a syrtos style dance from the Island of Samos named after a village on the island called Platano and from the famous song on the island called "Το πλατανιώτικο νερό". The song also comes from the village of Platanos on the island. None of the other villages on the island have a distinct dance.
