= Monodiplos =

Monodiplos is a traditional dance from the area of Messenia in the Peloponnese. The dance is typically a Kalamatiano dance with two variations. There is a single step and a double step back variation that occurs in the dance. The song typically used in this dance is "Stin Apano Geitonia". This is cited in a Evangelos Lambpropoulos research in 2009 called "Horoi apo Messiniaki Gis" ("Places from Messinian Land").
