= Pilioritikos =

Type of Greek folk dance

Pilioritikos (Greek: Πηλιορίτικος) is a kind of a Greek folk dance from Pilio, Thessaly, Greece.

== See also ==
- Music of Greece
- Greek dances
