= Gaitanaki =

Type of dance

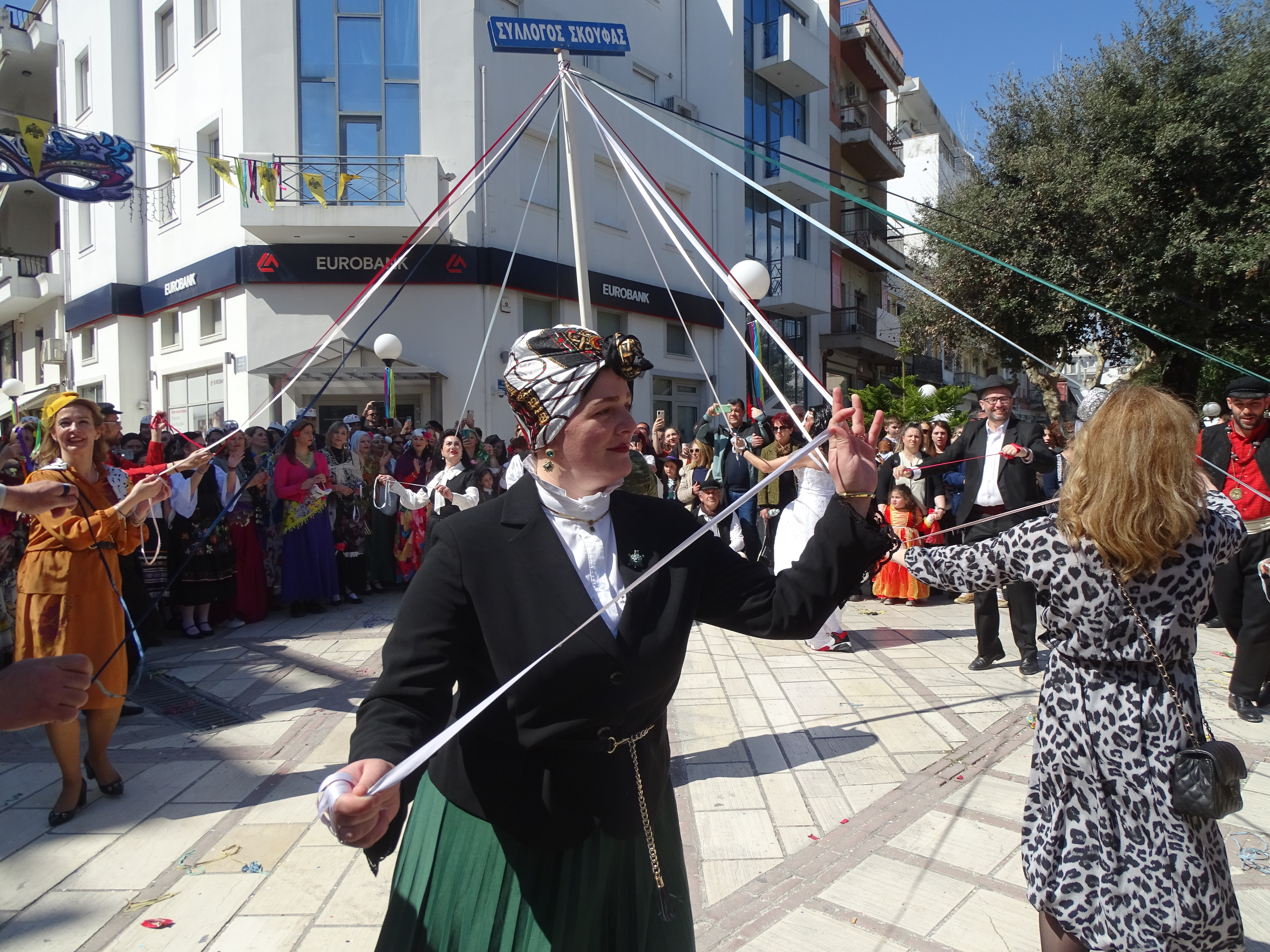
Maypole dance

Gaitanaki (Greek: γαϊτανάκι) is a form of a Greek folk dance from Thessaly, Greece. It is a circle dance. It is also very widespread in Epirus.

== See also ==
- Music of Greece
- Kalamatianos
- Syrtos
