= Ai Georgis =

Greek dance

Ai Georgis (Greek: Άη Γιώργης) is a dance from the village of Nestani in Arkadia, a region of Greece in the Peloponnesus which takes its name from the mythological character Arcas. The dance is performed and danced on the feast day of St George usually after Easter Sunday.

== Dance ==
The dance is accompanied only by song. The men lead the dance and the women follow. Each of the male dancers holds a shepherds crook which has been entwined with green leaves and wildflowers. The hand holding the crook is bent at the elbows. The rhythm of the song is in 7/8 and in 2/4.

The dance is made up of ten basic steps broken into four parts. The lyrics are about St George protecting the villagers from the hands of the Ottomans and about Hagia Sophia.

== See also ==
- Greek music
- Greek dances
- Greek folk music
- Nisiotika
- Sousta
- Ikariotikos
- Ai Georgis- Greece on DanceAsk
