= Pirgousikos =

Pirgousikos is a dance from Chios done during the festival season called the Apokries (Carnival) before Lent and at weddings. The dance is done in groups of three. Two men and one woman usually dance it and move dancing in a V formation. The dance is accompanied usually performed to an instrumental song. In the past dancers would sing along with a song. The violin is the main instrument used today in playing the melody instead of the traditional bagpipes (tsampouna). The musical rhythm is in 2/4. It is a dance from the village of Pirgi on the island of Chios.
