= Zervos (dance) =

Greek folk dance

External videos
- Zervos Eastern Rumelia (Northern Thrace)
- Zervos Eastern Rumelia (Northern Thrace)
- Thrace
- Karpathos

Zervos (Greek: Ζερβός) is the name of a folk dance in Karpathos and Eastern Rumelia (Northern Thrace - Βόρεια Θράκη)(Ανατολική Ρωμυλία) which is danced in Greece and generally in the Balkans anticlockwise (to the left). The music is generally played with a lyre (Kemenche) (or violin), lute, accordion and mandolin (or gaida).

== See also ==
- Greek music
- Greek folk music
- Syrtos
- Greek dances
- Music of Thrace
