= Palamakia =

Type of dance

The Palamakia (Greek: παλαμάκια) is a Greek folk dance from Zagorochoria and Tzoumerka in Greece. It is based on syrtos and the movements of the legs and arms.

== See also ==
- Music of Greece
- Greek dances
- Greek folk music
