= Kechagiadikos =

Kechagiadikos is a circle dance done on the Island of Lemnos in Greece. The dance is done free hold and moves in a circle.

Both men and women dance to the song 'Βρε Κεχαγιά Περήφανε' "Vre Kehagia Perifane'. The word Kehagia (Κεχαγιάς) comes from the Turkish word Kahya, meaning housekeeper.

== See also ==
- Kalamatianos
