= Aristonicus of Carystus =

Aristonicus or Aristonikos (Ancient Greek: Ἀριστόνικος) of Carystus was a ball player (σφαιριστής) in Alexander the Great's entourage. He was granted Athenian citizenship as well as a statue due to his athletic prowess.

He is also mentioned in Suda.
