= Koftos =

Type of Greek dance

Koftos (Greek: Κοφτός) is a lively Greek dance typical of the areas of Thessaly, Epirus and central Greece. "Koftos" in Greek means to cut and the name of the dance comes from the periodic interruptions in the music/tune. When the music stops, the dancers yell "Hey", and you can also put your arms up, down, or clap. This sta dio (two-measure) style dance is a faster syrtos (Syrtos, Sirto, Sirtos), that can also be danced going backwards and forwards or with partners.

== See also ==
- Greek music
- Greek dances
- Syrtos
- Kalamatianos
- Sousta
