= Kangeli =

Form of a Greek folk dance from Thessaly

Kangeli (Greek: καγκέλι) is a form of a Greek folk dance from Thessaly, Greece.

== See also ==
- Music of Greece
- Greek dances
