= Antikristos =

Type of dance

Antikristos or Antikrystós (Greek: αντικρυστός χορός) is a dance of Greek origin. “Aντικρυστός” in Greek language refers to the verb αντικρύζω “be across, opposite, face-to-face” (from Ancient Greek ἀντικρύ “vis-à-vis, face-to-face”). It is also known in Armenia. Antikristos has similarities with the karsilamas dance. It is danced in couples.

== See also ==
- Greek music
- Kalamatianos
- Kamilierikos
- Syrtos
- Greek dances
- Greek folk music
- Ballos
- Horon
