= Hasapiko =

Type of Greek folk dance from Constantinople

Fast Hasapikos in the atrium of the Zappeion on March 3, 1926.

The hasapiko (/həˈsæpɪkoʊ/ hə-SAP-ik-oh; Greek: χασάπικο, IPA: [xaˈs̠apiko]; lit. 'the butcher's [dance]', from Ottoman Turkish قصاب (kassâb) + -ικο (-iko)) is a Greek folk dance from Constantinople. The dance originated in the Middle Ages as a battle mime with swords performed by the Greek butchers' guild, which adopted it from the military of the Byzantine era. During the Byzantine era in Constantinople, it was called the makellarikos horos (μακελλάρικος χορός), also meaning 'butcher's dance'. Some Greeks, however, reserve the latter term only for the fast version of the dance.

The slow version of the dance is called the hasapikos varys (χασάπικος βαρύς; lit. 'heavy hasapiko') and generally employs a 4/4 meter. The fast version of the dance—variously called grigoro hasapiko (γρήγορο χασάπικο or the hasaposerviko (χασαποσέρβικο)—uses a 2/4 meter.

Sirtaki, the modern staple Greek dance, is a relatively new, choreographed dance, based on hasapiko.

== See also ==
- Greek dances
- Kalamatianos
- Pyrrhichios
- Serra
- Syrtos
