= Tsamiko =

Greek folk dance

The Tsamikos (Greek: Τσάμικος, Tsamikos) or Kleftikos (Greek: Κλέφτικος) is a popular traditional folk dance of Greece, done to music of 3/4 meter.

== The dance ==
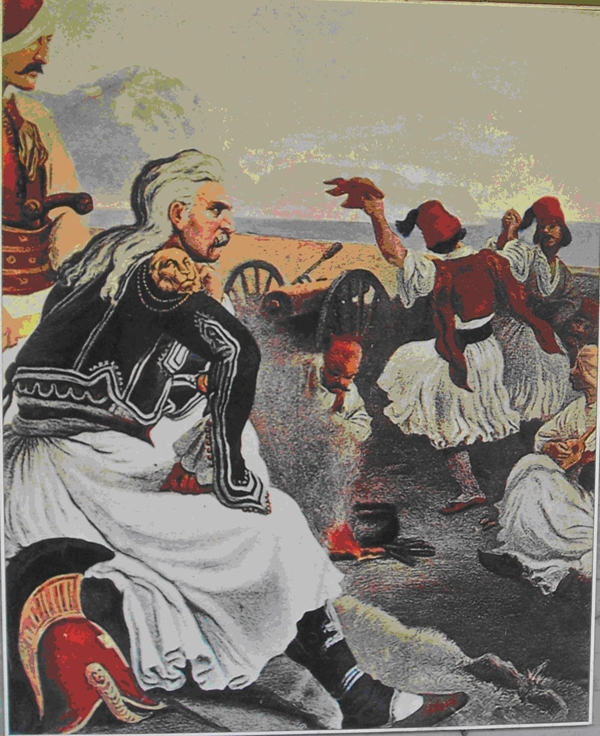
Men during the Greek War of Independence dancing Tsamiko

The dance follows a strict and slow tempo not emphasising on the steps, but more on the "attitude, style and grace" of the dancer. The dancers hold each other from each other's hands, bent 90 degrees upwards at the elbows. It takes a sturdy hand, especially if you are supporting the first or last person of the line (or circle) who will lean on you to perform high acrobatic leaps (usually kicking his right leg up as he takes off followed by the left (in a scissor-like motion), hitting the latter with the back of his hand before landing). The steps are relatively easy but have to be precise and strictly on beat. The dancer might even stomp his foot in response to a strong beat. There is some improvisation involved and many variations of the steps, depending on which area the dancers come from. Over time the dance has taken on many variations. In the past, it was danced exclusively by men, but in modern times both men and women take part.

== Tradition ==
The name Tsamiko literally means from Chameria or dance of the Chams. Swiss musicologist Samuel Baud-Bovy noted that the Greek Tsamiko was not danced among Cham Albanians. Its alternative name Kleftikos literally means dance of the Klephts, because it was associated with the klephts who fought during the Greek War of Independence (1821–1830). Tsamiko is danced almost exclusively by men. Today Tsamiko is a popular dance in festivals and weddings, especially in the rural areas of Central Greece, Peloponnese, Thessaly, as well as Epirus, where a slower version is performed. Sometimes the dancers dress in the traditional Greek fustanella. This dance is usually performed to celebrate national events like in the anniversary of the declaration of the start of Greek War of Independence in 1821.

The Tsamiko of Central Greece (Roumeli) is regarded as the standard version of this dancing genre and is popular throughout Greece. In Central Greece Tsamiko is the most popular folk dance. In Peloponnese Tsamiko is one of the most popular folk genres together with Syrtos. The Tsamiko is known as the Arvanitikos in the region of Mani. In Epirus Tsamiko is especially popular in the regions of Ioannina and Thesprotia. In general the Tsamiko of Epirus retains a slower tempo compared to the Tsamiko of Central Greece. The Epirote dances Kleftes and Perdikomata have been sometimes regarded as variants of Tsamiko, although this is not universally accepted since they have been also classified as distinct genres. A general classification of the dancing genres in Zagori region of Epirus can classify Osmanatakas and Berati as variations of Tsamiko too.

Although one of the main dancing genres in Epirus, Tsamiko is not the most popular folk genre in local discography.

The definition of "true" Tsamiko is obscure due to the many regional, choreographic, musical variations, versions, and names of the dance.

== See also ==
- Ballos
- Greek music
- Greek dances
- Hasapiko
- Sirtaki
- Sousta
- Syrtos

== Sources ==
- Ilias, Lenis (2009). Η Ρυθμική Συγκρότηση της Μουσικής της Ηπείρου. Technological Educational Institute of Epirus.
- M. and R. Schiel, Volkstänze aus Griechenland. Romiosini 1995.
