= Assyrian folk dance =

Type of dance

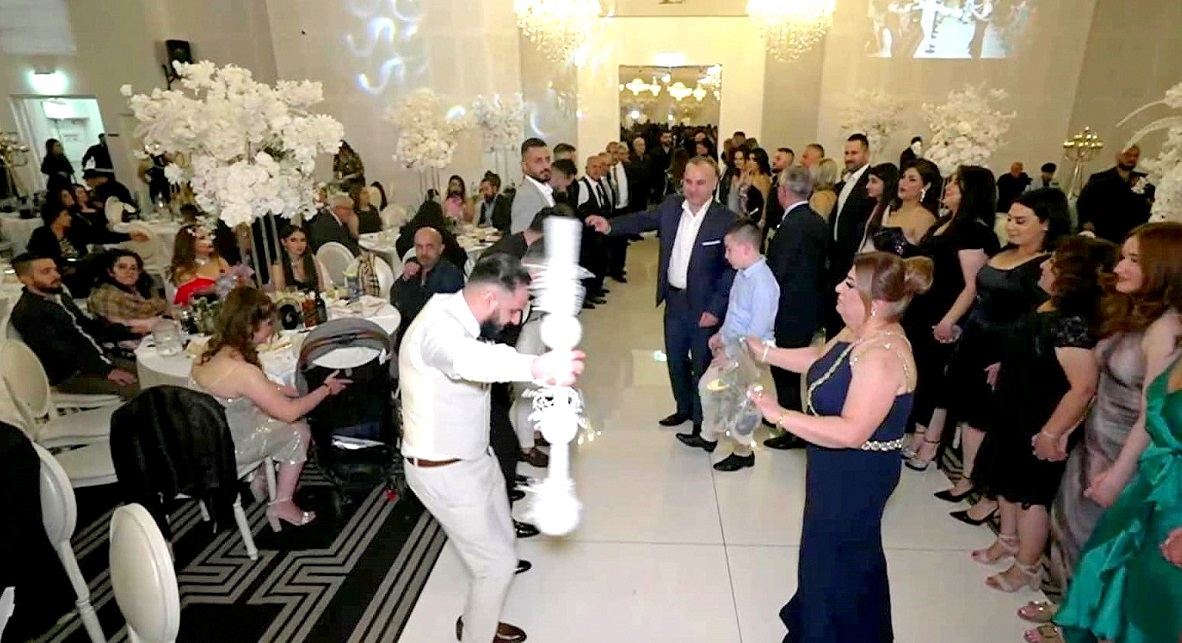
Ornamented canes (qopala) and handkerchiefs (yalekhta) may be wielded by the dancers.

Assyrian folk dances are sets of dances that are performed throughout the world by Assyrians, mostly on occasions such as weddings, community parties and other jubilant events.

Assyrian folk dances are mainly made up of circle dances like ballet that are performed in a line, which may be straight, curved, or both. Most of the dances allow unlimited number of participants, with the exception of the Sabre Dance, which require three at most. Assyrian dances would vary from weak to strong, depending on the mood and tempo of a song.

Assyrian folk dances belong to five metric groups: 2/4 (10 dances), 4/4 (6 dances), 6/8 (13 dances), 9/8 (1 dance), 10/8 (1 dance). The tempo would usually range from slow (70 beats per minute) to very fast (140 beats).

== History ==
Lily Oraham Taimoorazy, sometimes considered to be the mother of Assyrian folk dancing, founded a dance group called the Shamiram Folkloric Group in Tehran in 1957. The group performed at several different events in Iran and Europe, including the coronation of Mohammad Reza Pahlavi, until its disbandment in 1980. In the years leading up to her leaving Iran, she allowed American folk dance researcher Rickey Holden to publish booklets and phonographic records detailing Assyrian folk dances. The research done by Holden through his collaboration with the Shamiram Folkloric Group was the publication of two books, carefully noting the steps of the dances, as well as LPs and an article for Viltis translating and transliterating two Assyrian folk songs.

== Technique ==
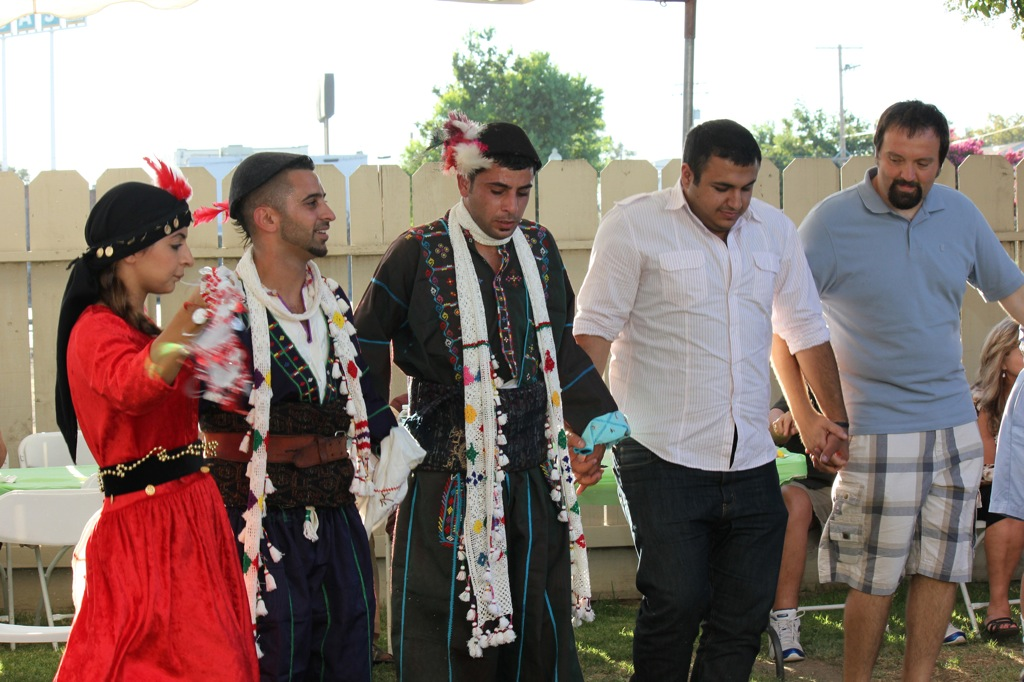
Lore clothing may be worn in the folk dance.

All Assyrian dances, with the exception of the Sabre Dance, are done in a connected circle. Most Assyrian circle dances are lateral, vining and open-ended, where more and more participants can join the dance. In an open floor space, the lines assume open circular shapes where they tend to curve and acquire spiral shapes as determined by floor space availability.

There are only five ways of moving the body; Step, leap, run, hop and jump. The legs are also used to stamp, stomp and kick. The arms are used predominantly and they'd usually move independently of the legs. Arm gestures include bouncing, swinging forward and back, moving side-to-side, lifting above the head and clapping.

In many dances, the torso, along with the shoulders and arms, bounce up and down rhythmically. Stomps and stamps are also executed in Assyrian folk dances. Knee bends, deep squats and leg extensions are a regular occurrence in Assyrian dance.

The connections include, hand-to-hand, hand to shoulder, and hand to hip, with hand-to-hand being the most popular. The hand-to-hand type has three connections; The "W", the "V" and the "T". The "W" arm hold is the most common where the arms are raised into the "W" position (or, at least, it appears to look like the letter W). The "T" dance is where hands are placed on other participants's shoulders. This is the least common dance of the three.

== Dances ==
=== Fast pace ===
- Siskany: The Siskany dance involves the participants briskly shaking their shoulders where they move their limbs energetically, with an emphasis on their feet in a zippy manner. It is usually classified as a form of khigga, but due to its fast performance and style, it is also considered its own dance. Sometimes the khigga beat is geared up to this to indicate a climactic end. The pulsating tempo is consanguineous to the electronic dance music and dance-pop found in western music. The dance technique is virtually like the khigga one, albeit it is in a faster fashion and with more emphasis placed on the feet. Alternatively, a simpler form involves the dancers plainly going forwards and backwards to the beat with stomps, as if they are rocking or swinging. The dance goes by the time signature of 4/4 and the tempo is around 120-135bpm.
- Gubbare: Mostly danced at the end of a party. The music is fast, lively and upbeat, akin to a jig. The music accompanying the dance is typically in the major key. Pinkies interlock, dancers repeatedly go forward and back in motion in the circle. People start by taking one step with their right, than one step to the left, and one step right again. During these steps, the arms are lifted and swung side to side in the same motion as the steps. Afterwards, dancers take their left foot and kick it into the air, than the right foot, than the left foot again before moving to the left while crossing their legs and swinging their arms down. The process than repeats all over again until the end of the song. Gubareh is in 4/4 and its tempo is around 125-135bpm.

Bablaka

- Bablaka: Fervently danced, with pinkies interlocking, where they (hands and arms too) move up and down energetically and perennially. But unlike gubareh, the participant is more stable where they will not prance forward and backwards in the dance floor. Motion is intemperately focused on arms, shoulders and hands in bablaka. Dancers may also rhythmically bend knees. The beat is virtually homogeneous to gubareh. It also danced at the end of parties. The meter is 4/4 and tempo is around 125-130bpm.
- Belaty: The dance is accompanied by a moderately fast-paced Arabic rhythm (similar to belly dancing music). Dancers would connect hand-to-hand in the circle, lift legs to the beat whilst making a slight leap and kick their legs to the sides in the air (this would repeat). An example of a notable song with a belaty beat is Ahela Yoni by Ashur Bet Sargis. Becoming somewhat rare recently, songs traditionally in its rhythm are now played and danced to in the Bagiyeh or Peda beat. The beat is 125-135bpm. 4/4.
- Tolama: Lively and energetic dance where the participants constantly jump and kick legs in the air repeatedly (similar in fashion to belaty and gubareh), whilst also moving their torso forward and backwards. It also danced at the end of parties after Gubbareh, but it is not as commonly practiced as Gubbareh. Assyrians have two varieties of the dance that involve either one or two legs, but both variants have participants continuously crossing their legs over one another. A notable song in this beat is Shoshonla by Shamiram Urshan. The time signature is 2/4 and temp is 125-140bpm.

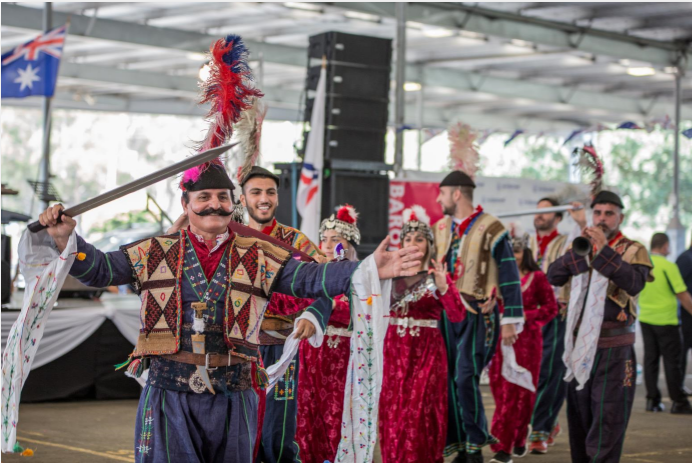
Assyrian traditional costumes, with the lead dancer bearing a sword

- Sabre dance: A solo dance that usually involves one to three participants. As the dance starts, the sword bearer dances by himself, waving his sword and holding his shield (a shield is optional, though). The dance represents the symbolic surrender of the bride to the groom and his family. In weddings, it is performed by the closest male relatives of the couple. The rhythm is a 6/8 duple meter, and this gives a "springy" feeling to the dance.

=== Moderate pace ===
- Khigga: The simplest and most common dance beat in Assyrian music. Individuals hold hands with the line or circle following around the dance floor where they gently move one leg forward, backward and repeat with the next leg while shifting to the right. Its music is the first beat that is played when welcoming the bride and groom to the reception hall. A notable song with this beat is Moralon by Evin Agassi. Furthermore, the term khigga is also occasionally used to denote all the Assyrian folk circle dances, i.e. "Khigga'd belaty" ("khigga of belaty"), "khigga'd gubareh", etc. It is generally danced from right to left by Iraqi and Iranian Assyrians. Khigga goes by the time signature of 4/4 with moderate tempo between 105-115bpm. Rhythm is similar to that of a shuffle beat.
  - Heavy Khigga (Khigga Yaqoora): Virtually the same dance as above, except the tempo is 'heavier' where the participants would make more ardent and exaggerated moves, as its name suggests, namely knee bending. It is not to be confused with Siskani, as that dance beat is faster and has distinguishing techniques. It is danced from right to left by Assyrians from Iraq and Iran, and left to right by Assyrians from Syria. Connection is always made by hands. Examples of songs having this beat is Zayno Mala by David Simon. Heavy khigga goes by the time signature of 4/4 with tempo between 115-120bpm.
  - Khigga'd Suria (Syrian Khigga) or Beriyeh: Danced by Assyrians from Syria, it is a standard khigga that is generally accompanied by a faster beat, usually at around 110-120bpm. Dancers connect by pinkies, where they repeatedly wave their connected pinkies whilst taking a few steps forwards and one step backwards. It is generally danced from left to right. The dance technique is similar to gubareh, but it lacks the fast-paced multiple forward-steps and leg kicking. It is danced during the entrance of the bride and groom at weddings.
- Tanzara: A folk dance native to the Armenian highlands, legend has it that the dance was brought to Anatolia by the ancient Assyrians during their conquest of the region in the Assyrian empire in commemoration to the god of food and vegetation. Dancers connect by holding hands in the circle or line, go forwards and backwards by making a little knee bending. Uncommon than above dances, and nowadays is most often performed by Armenians and Azeris. The time signature is 2/4 and tempo is 115-125bpm.
- Kochari: The notable attribute of this dance is that the participants are connected by arms-on-arms (akin to dabke). Each leg makes a kick in a repetitive manner. Common among Assyrians in Syria. Very rare among other Assyrians. 2/4, 110-120bpm

=== Slow pace ===
- Sheikhani: One of the older dances, Sheikhani is laid-back, albeit bouncy, and slightly slower than khigga. The main movement is two-step. The two-step begins with the right foot (right-left-right) and is then repeated with the left foot (left-right-left). Hands are interlocked, left arm is bent at the elbow and pressed against the back, right arm held forward against the back of the dancer in front. The dancers go forward a couple steps in, with their arms at their sides and at the same time, kick into the center. After that, they immediately step back out. A notable song with a sheikhani beat is Wye Wye Minakh by Sargon Gabriel. Sheykhani is 4/4 in time signature and is 90-105bpm. Rhythm is similar to a dembow.
- Bagiye (Sheikhani Yaqoora): Evolved from Sheikhani, Bagiyeh (also known as Sheikhani Yaqoora) has a move where the dancers slowly turn to face the back of the dancer in front or side of them, leisurely kick both legs in the air, then brusquely raise hands into air whilst making a sharp rotation. The dancers would turn to the right; their hands are hooked to one another by the fingers, the right arm is bent in front of the body, and the left arm is bent in behind the back. Although similar, bagiye is more sluggish and elaborate than sheikhany. Certain villages, such as Alqosh in the Nineveh Plains, will remove the “two step” move (the two extra kicks) making the sequences shorter. It's possible to see variations of the dance performed in the Assyrian diaspora. There is a homogeneous variant of this dance called Peda with particularised sets of songs, popularised by singer-songwriter Adwar Mousa in Syria. The dance beat has gotten popular in the late 2000s and 2010s, with songs traditionally in the belaty rhythm being incorporated into this beat. Notable song with a bagiyeh beat is Yalekhta by Linda George. Notable song affiliated with peda is Narineh by Sargon Gabriel. Bagiyeh is 4/4 in time signature and is 80-95bpm.
- Georgina: A Kurdish-inspired dance that's slow-paced and usually accompanied by sentimental ballads (one popular song being Zereneh by Janan Sawa). The music tends have a Turkish and Kurdish flavour. Dancers hold the pinkie or little finger and move them rhythmically (akin to bablaka, albeit gently). It is more common among Chaldean Assyrians. The tempo is around 70bpm-80bpm. 3/4.
- Chobi: A modern circle dance found in Iraqi music. It is also practiced by Iraqi Assyrians. The dance is similar to khigga, but it would have more pronounced leg elevation and swaying. Each leg swiftly kicks to the air and repeats. Arms sway forwards and backwards. Songs may usually be in Iraqi Arabic, but a few Assyrian songs such as Teela Teela by Evin Agassi would have this rhythm. The tempo is around 95bpm-100bpm.
- Arabanoo: A slow circle dance where dancers interconnect with pinkies and sway tardily around in a circle. Mostly practiced among Urmian Assyrians. It is not to confused with Georgina as this dance is slower and more serene in comparison. Aywateh by Evin Agassi utilizes this beat. Uncommon. 6/8, 52-66bpm
- Azia Tamma: Similar to sheikhani in terms of pace, but with more steps that go forward and backwards (or reverse) a notch. Not common. 2/4, 82-88bpm

== Other dances ==
These Assyrian folk dances are rarely danced, but they're still practiced within some tribes and/or special events:

- Akmale
- Azrabukeh: 6/8, 116-126bpm
- Bet-Karkhan
- Beriyo
- Chalakhan: 6/8, 126-132bpm
- Demale: 4/4, 63-69bpm
- Dimdimma: 2/4 or 6/8, 72-76 (2/4), 118-122bpm (6/8)
- Hareigooleh: 6/8, 116-124bpm
- Hoberban: 6/8, 130-134bpm
- Janiman: 10/8, 60-66bpm
- Mamer: 2/4, 122-130bpm
- Janiman: 10/8, 60-66bpm
- Hoberban: 6/8, 130-134bpm
- Mamyana: 2/4, 68-74bpm
- Shapshapa
- Shara: 6/8, 92-100bpm
- Sinjiyeh
- Zingirta: 2/4, 120-150bpm

== See also ==
- Middle Eastern dance
- Sirto
- Horon
- Bar
- An dro
- Music of Iraq
