= Adwar Mousa =

Assyrian singer-songwriter and poet

Adwar Mousa ܐܕܘܪ ܡܘܣܐ أدوار موسى
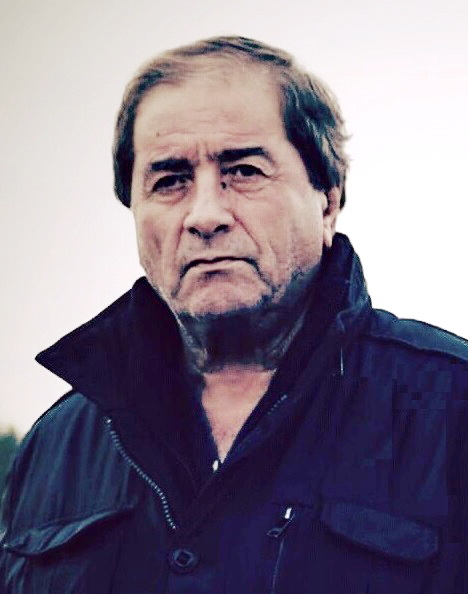

Background information
- Born: 10 April 1950 (age 75); Tel Tamer, Syria
- Genres: Assyrian music, folk, dance
- Occupations: Singer, songwriter
- Years active: 1970s–present

Adwar Mousa (Syriac: ܐܕܘܪ ܡܘܣܐ; Arabic: أدوار موسى, born 10 April 1950), also known as Edwar Mousa and Edward Mousa, is an Assyrian singer-songwriter and poet who mainly writes folk dance music.

== Biography ==
Mousa is originally from Syria, before he immigrated to Sweden and later resettled in Chicago with his family in the 2010s. His son Shady Mousa is a keyboardist, and his daughter, Nagham Adwar Mousa, is also a singer. Mousa is famed for writing a dozen notable songs in the late 1980s and early 1990s for prolific and popular Assyrian singers such as Sargon Gabriel, Ashur Bet Sargis, Janan Sawa, Linda George and Juliana Jendo, among others.

== Legacy ==
Adwar Mousa's dance songs "Narineh" and "Wye Wye Minakh", which were written for Sargon Gabriel, still remain widely covered and played in today's Assyrian weddings and jubilant parties. They are in the rhythm of bagiyeh and sheikhani, respectively, thus making them popular choices for dancing.

His other folk dance songs, such as "Hoy Jano", "Hatkha O Atkha", "Kewat Ya Shimshi" and "Barowen", are also immensely covered in Assyrian parties, which have gained popularity since the early 2010s, despite the fact that they were composed in the early 1990s. At over 2.1 million hits, "Kha Yoma Kheshli Khlola", written by Mousa and sung by Bassam Slivo, is one of the most-viewed Assyrian songs on YouTube.

== Discography ==
- Rwily (1998)
- En Tali (1999)
- Edward Mousa Live (2002)

=== Writing credits ===
Ashur Bet Sargis

- Loosh Ane Jooleh Sodaneh (1990)

Janan Sawa

- Min Poomakh, Min Poomy (1988)
- Shooshan (1988)

Juliana Jendo

- Khatir Aynatoukh (1988)
- Derdee (1990)
- Khlola (1990)
- Sogul (1990)
- Tlibee (1990)
- Bandee Bandee & Bereethan (1993)
- Laylee (2024)

Linda George

- Aynet Nooneh (1992)

Sargon Gabriel

- Wy Wy Minnakh (1987)
- Siqly Al Resha d'Toora (1992)
- Maney E Dzemra (1992)
- Bessa Sapar (1992)
- Nareeneh (1992)
- Rikidla Mya Meeney (1992)
- Matenee (1994)
- Yasmin (1994)

Shabeh Lawando

- Emin Dayer Azizi (1986)
- Slalee Al Karmanee (1990)
- Dashta (1990)
- Komta O Khwara (1990)
- Mbarkhula (1990)
- Sogul (1990)
- Saimon Moghdalee (1990)
- Sayda (1991)
- Sheshen Gulpani (1991)
- Mkhee Pokha (1991)
- Moomee (1992)
- Matwate d-Ninweh (1992)
- Hoy Jano (1993)
- Dilan (1993)
- Kma Bayinakh (1993)
- Tre Warden (1993)
- Sayraneh (1995)
- Saparchiwin (1995)
- Lo Athra (1995)
