= Evin Agassi discography =

Discography of Assyrian musician Evin Agassi

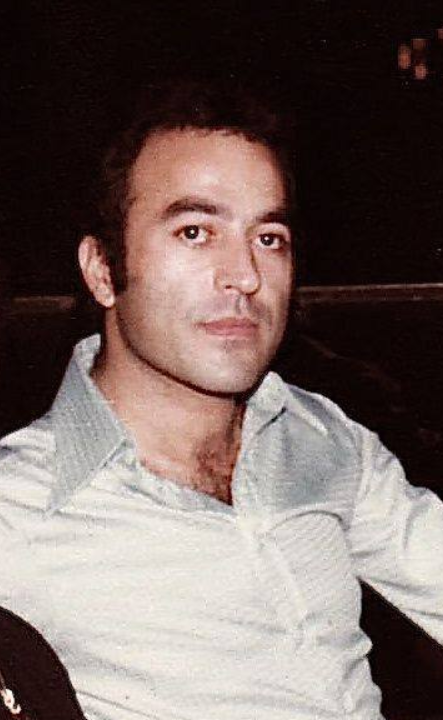
- Studio albums: 36
- EPs: 7
- Compilation albums: 1
- Singles: 2

Evin Agassi (1945-2024) was an Assyrian singer originally from Kermanshah, Iran. Over the course of his 50+ year career, until his death in September 2024, he had produced more than 40 albums, creating a rich discography. The vast majority of his albums were released in the 1980's and 1990's, with his last album, Ghasreh, being released in 2023.

Agassi had made a number of political songs after the Islamic Revolution in his native Iran, which were collected and banned by the Iranian and Iraqi governments. After relocating to the United States, he became very well known for his versatility in performing concerts around the Assyrian diaspora, as well as for his charitible efforts in the midst of the US invasion of Iraq.

== Albums ==
Many of Evin's studio albums were officially released on Spotify and Apple Music in 2024, just shortly before his death in September of that year.

=== Studio albums ===
Bakheelota (1975)
No.	Title	Length
1.	"Bakheelota"	5:06
2.	"Tlabta (Aywateh)"
3.	"Awara"
4.	"Kaloo Khitna"
5.	"Qariboota (Yimma)"
6.	"Gamechi"
7.	"Sitwa (Version 1)"
8.	"Sitwa (Version 2)"
9.	"Layla Majlim"
10.	"Khash'sha Khadoota (Chyoora O Prashta)"
11.	"Taliboota (Hoy Dalileh)"
12.	"Bet Yalda (Zeega D Omra)"
13.	"Eda Breekha (Barakhta D Eda)"
14.	"Sherinnakh"

Umta Burbista (1975)
No.	Title	Length
1.	"Umta Burbista (Dispersed Nation)"	7:53
2.	"Khoubba Qamaya"
3.	"Yama (v1)"	4:42
4.	"Kaloo Khitna"
5.	"Qariboota (Yimma)"
6.	"Gamechi"
7.	"Sitwa (Version 1)"
8.	"Sitwa (Version 2)"
9.	"Layla Majlim"

Semiremis (1980)
No.	Title	Lyrics	Music	Length
1.	"Shamiram"	Ewan Gewargis	Yoel Dan	3:11
2.	"Bayinakh (I Love You)"	Ewan Gewargis	Yoel Dan	3:51
3.	"Libba Shidana (Crazy Heart)"	Evin Agassi	Yoel Dan	4:02
4.	"Bellatti Dance"	Evin Agassi	Yoel Dan	2:24
5.	"Khayootit Matwateh (Village Life)"	Zakaria Givargis	Yoel Dan	2:37
6.	"Rooshoon Jabareh (Assyrian March)"	Ewan Gewargis	Yoel Dan	3:13
7.	"Zmarta Khareta (Last Song)"	Evin Agassi	Yoel Dan	3:38
8.	"Kheyeh Chiryeh (Priceless)"	Zakaria Givargis	Yoel Dan	6:01
9.	"Wedding (Khloola)"	Zakaria Givargis	Yoel Dan	5:17
10.	"Khoolma (Dream)"	Evin Agassi	Yoel Dan	3:09

Haft Sin (Farsi album) (1981)
No.	Title	Length
1.	"Haft Sin"	3:13
2.	"Niyaz"	2:55
3.	"Shahrzaad"	4:52
4.	"Ay Hmutn"	5:01
5.	"Karvan Zndgi"
6.	"Lhza Ha"	4:12
7.	"Feda"	2:56
8.	"Sahl Udria"
9.	"Music"

Winter (Mitra Beraya) (1981)
No.	Title	Lyrics	Music	Length
1.	"Mitra Beraya"	Zakaria Givargis	Bijan Azarmi	6:20
2.	"Mometa"	Gewargis Agassi	Bijan Azarmi	2:55
3.	"Boogara"	Gewargis Agassi	Bijan Azarmi	4:51
4.	"Mooraloon"	Gewargis Agassi	Bijan Azarmi	2:55
5.	"Sapar"	Gewargis Agassi	Bijan Azarmi	4:45
6.	"Allola"	Gewargis Agassi	Bijan Azarmi	2:27
7.	"Gola'd Allaha"	Gewargis Agassi	Bijan Azarmi	6:02
8.	"Mischeena"	Gewargis Agassi	Bijan Azarmi	3:10
9.	"Chma Shabateh"	Gewargis Agassi	Bijan Azarmi	4:15
10.	"Rodana"	Gewargis Agassi	Bijan Azarmi	7:10

Oormi (1982)
No.	Title	Lyrics	Music	Length
1.	"Dargooshta D Mardoota"	Gewargis Agassi	Hamlet Minassian	2:15
2.	"Alap Bet"	Gewargis Agassi	Hamlet Minassian	4:10
3.	"Mapshatta"	Gewargis Agassi	Hamlet Minassian	3:13
4.	"Zamara"	Gewargis Agassi	Hamlet Minassian	5:38
5.	"Urmi"	Gewargis Agassi	Hamlet Minassian	3:56
6.	"Saayada"	Gewargis Agassi	Hamlet Minassian	2:50
7.	"Shazada"	Gewargis Agassi	Hamlet Minassian	4:17
8.	"Prashta"	Gewargis Agassi	Hamlet Minassian	4:29

Cultivators (Khasade) (1983)
No.	Title	Lyrics	Music	Length
1.	"Khazade (Tillers)"	Gewargis Agassi	Nasser Cheshm Azar	3:57
2.	"Elchi (Suitors)"	Gewargis Agassi		3:18
3.	"Ly Ly (Lullaby)"	Gewargis Agassi		4:30
4.	"Saava (Drought)"	Gewargis Agassi	Nasser Cheshm Azar	4:31
5.	"Shekhda"	Gewargis Agassi	Norik Khachikian	4:15
6.	"Doonye (World)"	Gewargis Agassi		6:04
7.	"Le Hamenin (I Don't Believe)"	Gewargis Agassi	Nasser Cheshm Azar	4:52
8.	"Meni Vi (Be With Me)"	Gewargis Agassi		5:23

Habbania (1985)
No.	Title	Lyrics	Length
1.	"Habbania"	Gewargis Agassi	4:43
2.	"Talja"	Gewargis Agassi	2:48
3.	"Zona"	Gewargis Agassi	3:07
4.	"Nissan"	Gewargis Agassi	3:42
5.	"Atrad D'it, Atrad D'lit"	Gewargis Agassi	4:21
6.	"Sodrea Preta"	Gewargis Agassi	5:58
7.	"Zaalim"	Gewargis Agassi	3:27
8.	"Lelavati D'Ninveh"	Gewargis Agassi	4:32

Atrad Qoodme (Tomorrow's Country) (1986)
No.	Title	Lyrics	Music	Length
1.	"Oorhai"	Gewargis Agassi	Rennie Daniel	4:30
2.	"Yama"	Gewargis Agassi	Rennie Daniel	6:06
3.	"Nookhreta"	Gewargis Agassi	Rennie Daniel	3:31
4.	"Shabiba"	Gewargis Agassi	Rennie Daniel	3:31
5.	"Atrad Qoodme"	Gewargis Agassi		4:34
6.	"Shikle"	Gewargis Agassi		4:17
7.	"Ainey"	Gewargis Agassi		2:56
8.	"Sneqa"	Gewargis Agassi		4:43

Separ Smooqta (Red Zero) (1986)
No.	Title	Lyrics	Music	Length
1.	"Sipar Smoqta"	Gewargis Agassi	Yoel Dan	5:02
2.	"Lena Yawakh"	Gewargis Agassi	Yoel Dan	2:41
3.	"Hawar Hawar"	Gewargis Agassi	Yoel Dan	3:52
4.	"Orkha"	Gewargis Agassi	Yoel Dan	4:39
5.	"Hakkari"	Gewargis Agassi	Yoel Dan	4:24
6.	"Medreh Shapertet"	Gewargis Agassi	Yoel Dan	4:05
7.	"Rawaya"	Gewargis Agassi	Yoel Dan	4:23
8.	"Khayota"	Gewargis Agassi	Yoel Dan	4:32

Khela (Strength) (1987)
No.	Title	Lyrics	Music	Length
1.	"Khela"	Gewargis Agassi	David BetSamo	4:23
2.	"Yemi"	Gewargis Agassi	David BetSamo	4:39
3.	"Salila"	Gewargis Agassi	David BetSamo	4:18
4.	"Shvaveh"	Gewargis Agassi	David BetSamo	5:17
5.	"Brata d'Ishtar"	Gewargis Agassi	David BetSamo	4:55
6.	"Mookhnia"	Gewargis Agassi	David BetSamo	3:24
7.	"Dezhmin"	Gewargis Agassi	David BetSamo	6:42
8.	"Dalta"	Gewargis Agassi	Haroot Eskenian	4:33

Mometa D-Ata (1987)
No.	Title	Lyrics	Length
1.	"Syameeda"	Gewargis Agassi	5:48
2.	"Loja"	Gewargis Agassi	6:30
3.	"Maianad Chtava"	Gewargis Agassi	6:33
4.	"Mometa D'Ata"	Gewargis Agassi	1:45
5.	"Rooshiateh"	Gewargis Agassi	5:54
6.	"Jnaha D'mani"	Gewargis Agassi	4:21
7.	"Shlama"	Gewargis Agassi	4:23

Campeh (1989)
No.	Title	Lyrics	Length
1.	"Campeh"	Gewargis Agassi	5:34
2.	"Ainee L Orkha"	Gewargis Agassi	3:35
3.	"Bidyaldakh Aveh Breekha (Birthday (Her))"	Evin Agassi	4:31
4.	"Ajeboota"	Gewargis Agassi	4:00
5.	"Len Miro"	Gewargis Agassi	3:31
6.	"Chaloo Khitna"	Evin Agassi	3:57
7.	"Bidyaldookh Aveh Breekha (Birthday (His))"	Evin Agassi	4:32

Azaad (1989)
No.	Title	Lyrics	Length
1.	"Azaad"		4:03
2.	"Sparta"		4:13
3.	"Adaat"		4:47
4.	"Alaha Yowakhileh"		3:18
5.	"Khobba"		3:14
6.	"Raya"	Evin Agassi	4:11
7.	"Bayenakh"		4:19
8.	"Shweeta D Mara"		3:24

Oorzeh (1990)
No.	Title	Lyrics	Music	Length
1.	"Orzeh"	Givergiss Agassi	Beni Alamsha	4:06
2.	"Brata D Omta"	Givergiss Agassi	Beni Alamsha	4:30
3.	"Dokta Spikhta"	Givergiss Agassi	Beni Alamsha	4:56
4.	"Gikhka"	Givergiss Agassi	Beni Alamsha	3:59
5.	"Deqlat"	Givergiss Agassi	Beni Alamsha	4:33
6.	"Lela Waya"	Evin Agassi	Beni Alamsha	5:00
7.	"Kikhweh Lajlijaneh"	Givergiss Agassi	Beni Alamsha	6:20

Gareh (1992)
No.	Title	Length
1.	"Gareh"	3:25
2.	"Sanam"	4:58
3.	"Dars"	7:11
4.	"Khabour"	4:53
5.	"Shurshia"	3:58
6.	"Malikta"	4:37
7.	"Tuniali"	4:51

Sama Khwara (1992)
No.	Title	Lyrics	Length
1.	"Hayer"	Givergiss Agassi	4:49
2.	"Shemakh"	Givergiss Agassi	3:51
3.	"Tlanita"	Givergiss Agassi	4:27
4.	"Sara"	Givergiss Agassi	4:00
5.	"Sama Khwara"	Givergiss Agassi	5:34
6.	"Giveta"	Evin Agassi	4:54
7.	"Beti"	Givergiss Agassi	4:40

Sapar D Garbia (1993)
No.	Title	Lyrics	Music	Length
1.	"Sapard Garbia"	Givergiss Agassi	Sarmen Arissian	4:51
2.	"Tuwili"	Ewin Agassi	Sarmen Arissian	4:31
3.	"Khela D Khubba"	Givergiss Agassi	Sarmen Arissian	6:41
4.	"Bet Nahrain"	Givergiss Agassi		3:14
5.	"Rabiti"	Givergiss Agassi		4:21
6.	"Zuiza"	Givergiss Agassi		5:15
7.	"Leba"	Evin Agassi	Sarmen Arissian	3:42

United Nations (1994)
No.	Title	Lyrics	Length
1.	"United Nations"		4:53
2.	"Shekla"		5:41
3.	"Khulma"	Givergiss Agassi	6:23
4.	"Qalet Tara"		4:52
5.	"Shupra"		4:27
6.	"Khavertakh"		3:25
7.	"Ktawa"		4:08

Natooreh (1994)
No.	Title	Lyrics	Length
1.	"Natooreh"	Givergiss Agassi	3:46
2.	"Miooqorta"	Givergiss Agassi	4:40
3.	"Lipa Alakh"	Givergiss Agassi	5:22
4.	"Boorakha"	Givergiss Agassi	3:42
5.	"Malek"	Givergiss Agassi	4:40
6.	"Bot Diakh"	Givergiss Agassi	5:46
7.	"Atra D Khooba"	Givergiss Agassi	5:36

Yesterdays (1995)
No.	Title	Length
1.	"Brata D Kholma (Dream Girl)"	4:03
2.	"Tookhronia (Memories)"	4:34
3.	"Mooidaleh (Together)"	4:48
4.	"Manshianti"	5:02
5.	"Iqara D Khoba (Honoring Love)"	5:35
6.	"Le Bayen (I Don Not Want)"	5:37
7.	"Isri Sheneh (Twenty Years)"	6:08

Geryeh Mard (Farsi album) (1995)
No.	Title	Length
1.	"Sayeha"	4:03
2.	"Mojdeh (Farsi version of Sparta)"	4:34
3.	"Nakhostin Didar"	4:48
4.	"Geryeh Mard"	5:02
5.	"Hich"	5:35
6.	"Leyla"	5:37
7.	"Daftare Eshgh"	6:08
8.	"Instrumental (of Mojdeh)"	0:52

Son Of Our Times (1995)
No.	Title	Lyrics	Music	Length
1.	"Broonad Zona"	Givergiss Agassi	Sarmen Arissian	5:18
2.	"Lebi"	Givergiss Agassi	Sarmen Arissian	4:50
3.	"Ta Door"	Givergiss Agassi	Sarmen Arissian	6:02
4.	"Bazaar"	Givergiss Agassi	Sarmen Arissian	4:21
5.	"Lit Kha Ida"	Givergiss Agassi	Sarmen Arissian	6:35
6.	"Palji Tliqa"	Givergiss Agassi	Sarmen Arissian	6:44
7.	"Malakhiate"	Givergiss Agassi	Sarmen Arissian	5:34

New Generation (1996)
No.	Title	Length
1.	"Bespara"	5:40
2.	"Khoobi Qatakh"	4:52
3.	"Oormi Oormi"	4:17
4.	"Golmaneh (Wings)"	3:35
5.	"Atyaneh D Bar Dian (New Generation)"	5:31
6.	"Le Hoya (Impossible)"	6:55
7.	"Mani Bayeh Qatakh"	5:15

Perdesa (1997)
No.	Title	Lyrics	Length
1.	"Dora d'Isri Kha"	Givergiss Agassi	3:23
2.	"Khadoota"	Givergiss Agassi	3:26
3.	"Tani"	Givergiss Agassi	4:03
4.	"Teela"	Givergiss Agassi	4:57
5.	"Perdesa"	Givergiss Agassi	6:19
6.	"Ainah Choomeh"	Givergiss Agassi	4:59
7.	"Saahra"	Givergiss Agassi	5:08
8.	"Ay Che Bayalookh"		4:28

Fisherman (1998)
No.	Title	Length
1.	"Roosh"	4:34
2.	"Yonita"	4:10
3.	"Lobella"	4:33
4.	"Khora Tliqa"	4:35
5.	"Saprat"	6:12
6.	"Zamara Awara"	4:50
7.	"Saayada"	5:47

Broken Chain (1999)
No.	Title	Lyrics	Length
1.	"Shelioota D-Lelavateb"	Givergiss Agassi	5:02
2.	"Metelta D'Bayoota"		5:50
3.	"Chtivakh Evin"		6:08
4.	"Sheshelta"	Givergiss Agassi	4:55
5.	"Hameni"		3:41
6.	"Soopra"		4:41
7.	"La Boogherakh"		3:56

Happiness (1999)
No.	Title	Length
1.	"Khloola"	4:46
2.	"Che Bayenakh"	4:55
3.	"In Le Bayatli"	3:57
4.	"Khooba Khooba"	3:34
5.	"Khamneh Che Bayena"	5:37
6.	"Shaaraa"	5:31
7.	"Rawaya D-Beyoota"	5:10

Baghdad (2000)
No.	Title	Lyrics	Music	Length
1.	"Baghdad"	Givergiss Agassi	Sarmen Arissian	8:50
2.	"Manshili Manshi"	Givergiss Agassi	Hilal Mati	5:15
3.	"Lebbi Minakh Le Saqid"	Givergiss Agassi	Hilal Mati	3:56
4.	"Leepewin Minnakh"	Givergiss Agassi	Hilal Mati	5:24
5.	"Nineveta"	Givergiss Agassi	Hilal Mati	4:12
6.	"Qala D Zorna Dawoola"	Givergiss Agassi	Hilal Mati	3:44
7.	"Riqda D Qrawtaneh"	Givergiss Agassi	Hilal Mati	4:16

Letter To God (2000)
No.	Title	Lyrics	Length
1.	"Khamra D Khooba (Wine Of Love)"	Givergiss Agassi	6:19
2.	"Kha Leba (A Heart)"	Givergiss Agassi	6:26
3.	"Khooba Atiqa (Old Love)"	Givergiss Agassi	4:28
4.	"Beyootan (Our Love)"	Givergiss Agassi	4:11
5.	"Letter To God"	Givergiss Agassi	6:42
6.	"La Ploot (Don't Leave Me)"	Givergiss Agassi	6:40
7.	"Sooroota (Childhood)"	Givergiss Agassi	5:22

Happiness II (2005)
No.	Title	Length
1.	"You Loved Me"	5:26
2.	"I Won't Say"	5:12
3.	"Your Black Eyes"	5:08
4.	"Beautiful (Shapirta)"	4:38
5.	"Country Life"	4:44
6.	"Your Birthday"	5:26
7.	"The Wedding Night"	5:40
8.	"Not This Time"	4:13

Memories (2005)
No.	Title	Lyrics	Music	Length
1.	"Voice Of Love"	Givergiss Agassi	Sarmen Arissian	5:41
2.	"Rose Garden"	Givergiss Agassi	Sarmen Arissian	5:02
3.	"Going Far"	Givergiss Agassi	Sarmen Arissian	5:20
4.	"Blessed Flag"	Givergiss Agassi	Sarmen Arissian	5:20
5.	"Queen Of My Heart"	Givergiss Agassi	Sarmen Arissian	6:25
6.	"What Else Do You Want"	Givergiss Agassi	Sarmen Arissian	3:50
7.	"Forgotten Gift"	Givergiss Agassi	Sarmen Arissian	5:25
8.	"My Brother Ninos"	Givergiss Agassi	Sarmen Arissian	5:44

The Circle of Life (2011)
No.	Title	Length
1.	"Yama D'khooba"	4:49
2.	"Shaance"	5:57
3.	"Hamin Hamin"	5:33
4.	"Lela B'dookh"	4:15
5.	"Ay Lela"	3:47
6.	"Sneeghoota"	5:04
7.	"Leba D'shooba"	4:52
8.	"Matan"	5:46
9.	"Khizva"	4:32
10.	"Takhmanteevat"	5:10
11.	"Mitrate'd Ayna"	6:12
12.	"La'khzeelakh Gatee"	6:42
13.	"Gala D'ninveh"	4:12
14.	"Roosh"	4:35
15.	"Doonye"	6:17

45 Years of Singing (2016)
No.	Title	Lyrics	Length
1.	"Le Chalakh"	Givergiss Agassi	3:57
2.	"Jamee D Oomta"	Givergiss Agassi	5:22
3.	"Khooyada"	Givergiss Agassi	4:56
4.	"Madinkha"	Givergiss Agassi	6:29
5.	"Baba"	Givergiss Agassi	7:33
6.	"Oomana"	Givergiss Agassi	5:30

Madinkha (2018)
No.	Title	Length
1.	"Arbee Khamsha Shineh 'D Zmaree"	5:00
2.	"Barwar"	5:35
3.	"Oomana"	5:30
4.	"Malcha 'o Malichta"	5:48
5.	"Khloola"	3:25
6.	"Ghala 'D Zeeja"	4:47

Ghasreh (2023)
No.	Title	Lyrics	Music	Length
1.	"In Shoghat"	Givergiss Agassi	Sarmen Arissian	5:54
2.	"Bit Tanina"	Givergiss Agassi	Hossein Pishvaz	2:51
3.	"Bayanakh Teeleh"	Givergiss Agassi	Hilal Matti	4:15
4.	"Malakhta"	Givergiss Agassi	Hossein Pishvaz	3:40
5.	"Khabra Litla"	Givergiss Agassi	Hossein Pishvaz	3:12
6.	"Ghasreh"	Givergiss Agassi	Sarmen Arissian	4:58
7.	"Warda"	Givergiss Agassi	Hilal Matti	2:33
8.	"Tanee Gatee"	Givergiss Agassi	Masis	2:17

=== Compilation albums ===
Nostalgic Hits 1959 (1984)
No.	Title	Length
1.	"Awara"	5:46
2.	"Chaloo Khitna"	3:14
3.	"Zijad Oomra"	4:44
4.	"Jamichi"	2:30
5.	"Yema (Mother)"	4:43
6.	"Talakh Sojol"	4:36
7.	"Dalaboota"	4:03
8.	"Khlita"	3:12
9.	"Aaiwateh (Clouds)"	5:26

== EPs ==
Some of the singles on Evin's EPs are featured on a compilation album, Nostalgic Hits 1959, from 1984.

Record 1 (1967)
No.	Title	Lyrics	Length
1.	"Awara"	Belis Daniel	5:47
2.	"Kalu U Khitna"	Daniel Benyamin

Record 2 (1968)
No.	Title	Lyrics	Length
1.	"Bet Yalda"	Zakaria Givargis
2.	"Barakhta"	Zakaria Givargis

Record 3 (1969)
No.	Title	Lyrics	Length
1.	"Nukhraya (Yimma) (Gharibbota)"	Zacharia George
2.	"Tukhrunya (Gameechi)"	Zacharia George

Record 4 (1970)
No.	Title	Lyrics	Length
1.	"Bakheelota (AYWATEH)"	Zacharia George
2.	"Taliboota (MAMIR)"	Zacharia George

Record 5 (1970)
No.	Title	Lyrics	Length
1.	"Taliboota"	Zacharia George
2.	"Chyoora O Prashta"	Zacharia George

1933 (1984)
No.	Title	Lyrics	Length
1.	"1933 - Simele"	Gewargis Agassi	5:15
2.	"Beth Nahrain"	Gewargis Agassi	3:21

Khazade (2024)
No.	Title	Lyrics	Length
1.	"Khazade (2024 Remastered Version)"	Gewargis Agassi	3:46
2.	"Khazade (Brynner's Drum Version)"	Gewargis Agassi	3:59

== Singles ==
Title	Release
"1 2 3"	2020
"B'derakh"	2021
