= Khigga =

Cultural Folk Dance

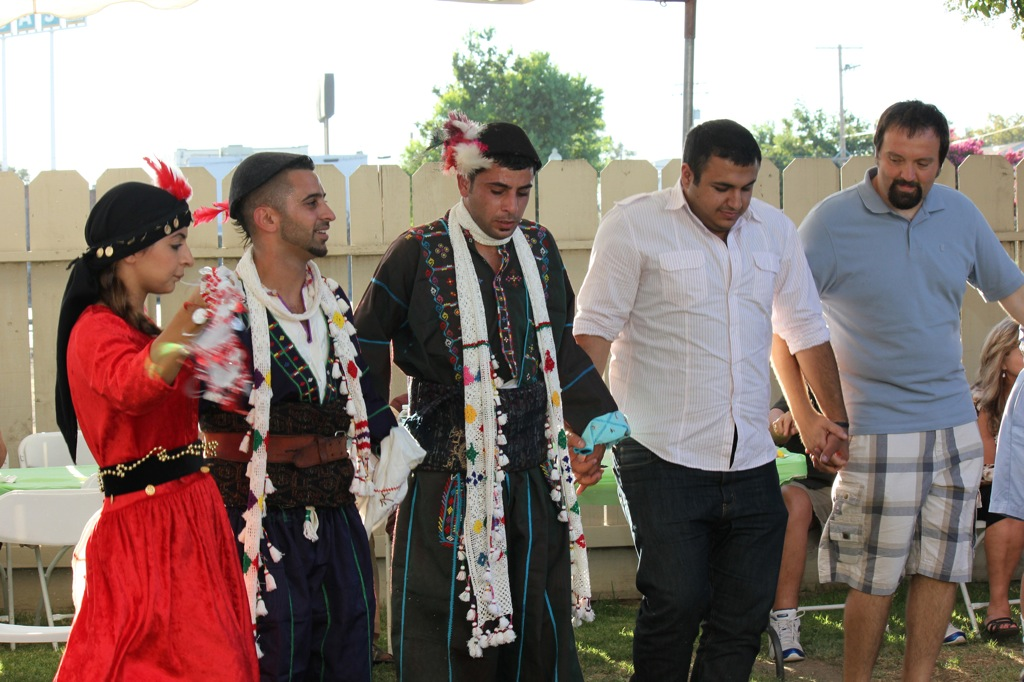
Assyrians dancing khigga at a party event.

Khigga is a style of Assyrian folk dance in which multiple dancers hold each other's hands and form a semi-circle or a curved line. There are multiple foot patterns that dancers perform. Its thought to have been danced for thousands of years. It is one of the most common and simplest Assyrian folk dances, generally performed at weddings, baptisms, confirmations and other joyous occasions. Set in common time, khigga is accompanied by a moderate dance beat and is usually performed to Assyrian folk and pop music.

To note, the term Khigga is occasionally used to denote all the Assyrian folk circle dances, i.e. "Khigga'd Belaty" ("Khigga of Belaty"), "Khigga'd Gubareh", etc.

== Background ==
The word 'khigga' comes from Classical Syriac ܚܳܓ (ḥāgg, “to go around”) and is a cognate of Arabic haj (حج).

Khigga is traditionally danced with music played on the zurna, supported by a davul, but in recent years, both acoustic and electronic instruments have started to replace them. The khigga has spread from Anatolia to many other regions, such as Armenia and the Balkans. The khigga is a group of traditional hand-holding dances similar to those from the Balkans and Eastern European countries, with a single or a couple of figure dancers often added to the geometrical centre of the dancing circle.

In Assyrian weddings, as well as parties and other various social gatherings, people may dance khigga for hours. Every region has its own style and forms. Khigga is simple to dance and it is the first beat that is played in welcoming the bride and groom to the reception hall.

== Technique ==
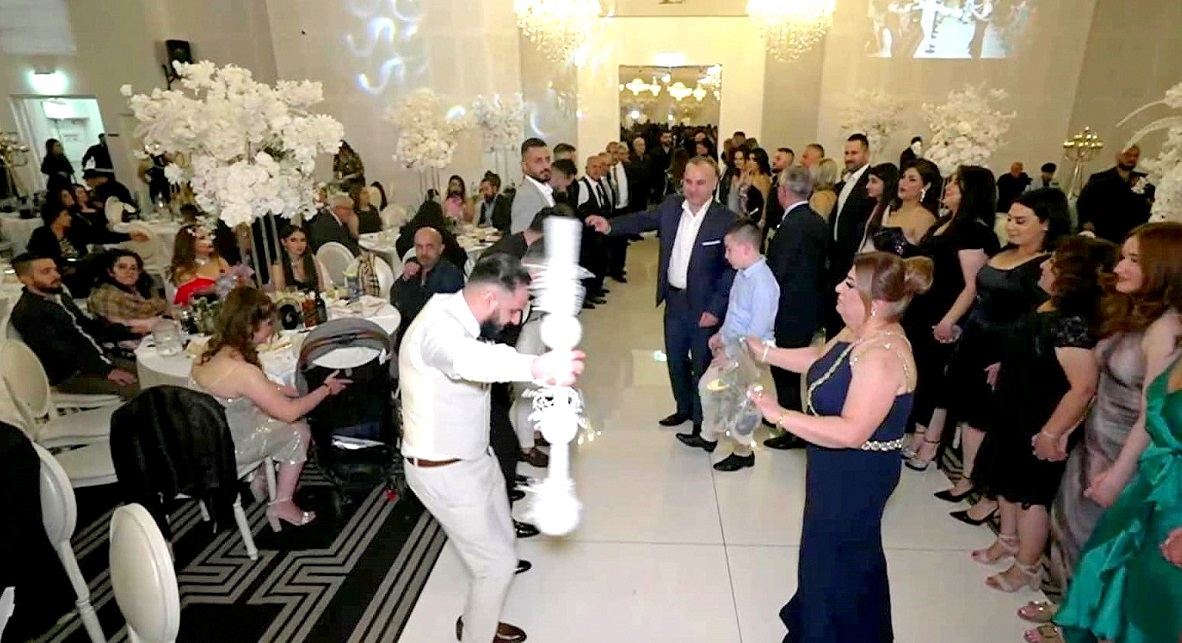
Ornamented canes (qopala) is generally wielded by the leader of the dance.

As with most Assyrian folk dances, khigga assumes an open circular shape and is open-ended, where more and more participants can join throughout the dance session. In a restricted floor space (e.g. a lot of tables), the dance would tend to vine around the room and assume spiral, circular and curvy shapes. Arms are predominantly used which usually move independently of the legs. Arm motions include bouncing, swinging forward and back, moving side-to-side. The torso, along with the shoulders and arms, bounces up and down rhythmically, often independently of the legs. Stomps and stamps are also present. Khigga goes by the time signature of 4/4 and tempo between 100 and 115.

Connection can also be made by pinkies, such as in the variant danced by Assyrians from Syria ("khigga'd suria" or "beriye"), which is accompanied by a faster beat, usually at around 115-120bpm, where the dancers wave their connected pinkies whilst taking a few steps forward and one step backwards in a brisk manner. This Syrian khigga form is generally danced from left to right and it also is the first beat danced in a Syrian-Assyrian wedding when the married couple are welcomed in the reception.

Khigga has other varieties such as "Heavy Khigga" or "Normal/Standard Khigga". With Heavy Khigga (or "Khigga Yaqoora" in Assyrian), the tempo is 'heavier', as its title suggests, where the participants would make more ardent and exaggerated moves, such as knee bending and rhythmical shoulder motions. It is not to be confused with Siskani, as that dance beat is faster and has distinguishing techniques. The Siskany dance, which may be deemed a khigga variant, is a much faster paced form of khigga where the dancers bend their knees and briskly shake their shoulders in a zippy manner, or just move forwards and backwards. Sometimes the khigga beat is geared up to this to indicate a climactic end.

The head of the khigga line, referred to as "Resha d'khigga" (ܪܝܫܐ ܕܚܓܐ), usually dances with a Yalekhta (ܝܠܚܬܐ), or a handkerchief with beads and bells added to the sides so it jingles when shaken. A Yalekhta can have many different designs on the piece of cloth. A "copala" (ܟܘܦܠܐ), or decorated cane, is also used at many Assyrian weddings. Among Iraqi Assyrians, khigga goes from right to left, whereas Assyrians from Syria generally dance the khigga from left to right.

== See also ==
- Tovlama, another Assyrian dance
- Kochari
- Dabke
- Tamzara
