= Linda George (Assyrian singer) =

Linda George ܠܢܕܐ ܓ̰ܘܪܓ̰
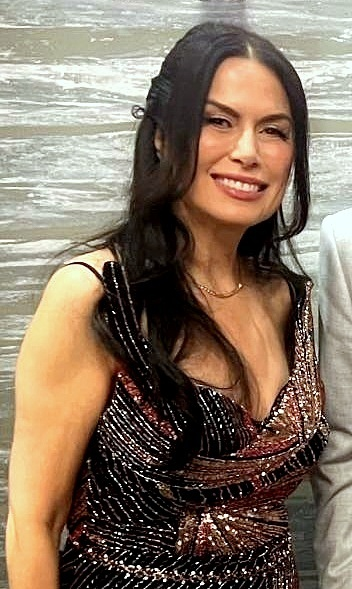
- Chicago, 2025

Background information
- Born: Linda Gewargis; 11 February 1964 (age 62); Baghdad, Iraq
- Origin: Chicago, United States
- Genres: Assyrian pop, dance-pop, folk
- Occupations: Singer, singer-songwriter
- Instruments: Vocals
- Years active: 1980–present
- Website: Official Linda George site

Linda George (Syriac: ܠܢܕܐ ܓ̰ܘܪܓ̰; (Note: Sometimes written ܠܝܢܕܐ ܓ̰ܘܪܓ̰.) born 11 February 1964) is an Assyrian-American singer known for her sentimental ballads and dance songs. The vast majority of her songs are sung in her native Assyrian Neo-Aramaic dialect, though a few are in English, Surayt, and Arabic. She has written the lyrics for many of her songs.

George is one of the most well-known Assyrian singers, having toured Oceania, Europe and Asia. She is the most liked Assyrian figure on Facebook. In 2010, Esquire magazine chose George as the representative from Iraq in a special, 194-nation edition of their Sexiest Woman Alive feature.

== Biography ==
Linda George's family originates from the Hakkari region of Turkey. She is a Tyari from Ashitha in Hakkari province. They were displaced during World War I and were deported to Iraq. George has been singing since she was a little girl: her career began at the age of five. She was the church choir soloist in Baghdad, where she appeared on national television. At a young age, she never thought that singing will be her career path.

She moved to Amman, Jordan in 1979. Later that year, she migrated to the US, where her career started in the Assyrian community in Chicago. She has since toured Australia, Europe and Canada throughout the decades, having travelled over 3,000,000 miles (4,800,000 km), if one would count her airplane travels in her career. Alongside the Assyrian homeland, Germany is one of her favorite places to visit.

== Career ==
Linda George was discovered by Assyrian singer Sargon Gabriel in 1980, where he took her up on the stage with him so she would perform as his assistant singer and gain experience. Impressed with her work, Gabriel featured George on his track "Dalaleh" in 1981. The track became a popular record in the Assyrian community and helped George land her own album. George's first album, Hal Eiman, was released in 1983 and instantly was a success. George continued her success into the early 1990s, and became the first Assyrian singer to use contemporary beats with traditional Assyrian singing.

After dabbling with different beats and contemporary mixes on her three previous albums, George revolutionized the way of Assyrian music on her seventh album, "Khamra Tiqa" released in 1993; the album's lead single "Matlab D'Libba" featured the first rapping in Assyrian music. The song, which is also dubbed the "Chapeh Chapeh Song" became successful. The album's other standout track however was "Barwar", released after the Gulf War in which the region of Barwari in Northern Iraq was bombed and left in ruin.

In the mid to late 1990s, George released two albums. Her last studio album of the decade was 1995's "Khoot Golpaneh D'Malakha"; the single in the album with the same name, 'Khoot Golpaneh D'Malakha', is one of her favorite compositions. The album contained a little bit of everything that George's previous albums featured, such as traditional music, upbeat contemporary beats, ballads and dance hits. Her 1983 ballad "Tara Dorokh" (You Closed The Door) was featured in the episode "Furies" in the third season of Xena: Warrior Princess. (Note: The song was remixed into having a worldbeat rhythm and the vocals were provided by Julie Yousif. Moreover, the song was mashed up with "Aha Kiana Zalim" by Jermain Tamraz (also sung by Yousif in the show))

In April 2001, in the Assyrian New Year, she made her historical tour to Northern Iraq, where she was welcomed by over 20,000 Assyrian fans. In 2005, after Saddam Hussein was deposed as the leader of Iraq, George released "I am Free", an EP sung in Arabic with four songs. The lead single, "Ana Hurra", was released worldwide as an anthem for the newly liberated Iraq. As she toured Australia for the 22nd time in 2010, she was able to finish shooting one of her hits on this album, "Madeleey", which was recorded in the Royal National Park. Recently, her music has been produced by other Assyrian artists, such as Sargon Youkhana and Johni Esho.

== Musical style and influences ==
George has dabbled with popular American music genres such as R&B, urban and electronic dance music in her career, particularly in the 1990s. Her Assyrian songs generally range from lush romantic ballads to traditional folk dance and as well as patriotic music. Despite George's pop music disposition, her preferred musical style is singing church hymns (and she has made several hymn recordings for the Assyrian Church of the East).

Her favorite singers include Sargon Gabriel, Evin Agassi, Ashur Bet Sargis, Whitney Houston, Josh Groban, Barbra Streisand, Andrea Bocelli, Fayrouz, Umm Kulthum, and Googoosh. Furthermore, she has pushed the Assyrian community to implement a record label within the Assyrian music production sphere.

== Discography ==
- 1983 – Hal Eiman ("How Long?")
- 1984 – Kursia D'Malkoota ("The Kingdom's Throne")
- 1986 – Melodies from North of My Country [sic]
- 1988 – Warda Bil Drananeh D'Khubba ("Flower on the Shoulders of Love")
- 1988 – Kinara D'Roukha ("Harp of the Soul")
- 1989 – Alahta D'Khubba, Shupra O Khaila ("Goddess of Love, Beauty and Power")
- 1992 – Kuma W'Khwara ("Black and White")
- 1993 – Khamra Tiqa ("Old Wine")
- 1995 – Khoot Golpaneh D'Malakha ("Beneath the Wings of an Angel")
- 1996 – Peace on Earth
- 1997 – The Golden Collection
- 1999 – Colors of My Country
- 2001 – No Quarter (English single)
- 2003 – Silence of a Valley
- 2005 – Anaa Hurra ("I Am Free", Arabic EP)
- 2007 – Doushi ("My Honey")
- 2010 – Mokhneeten Minokh ("I Miss You")
- 2010 – Pearls of The East
- 2013 – Linda George & Friends
- 2014 – Saariq al-Malakoot ("The Thief of the Kingdom", Arabic single)
- 2015 – Poolada ("Steel")
- 2017 – Lela Khteeta ("Isn't It a Pity")
