= Kochari =

Folk dance of the Armenian Highlands

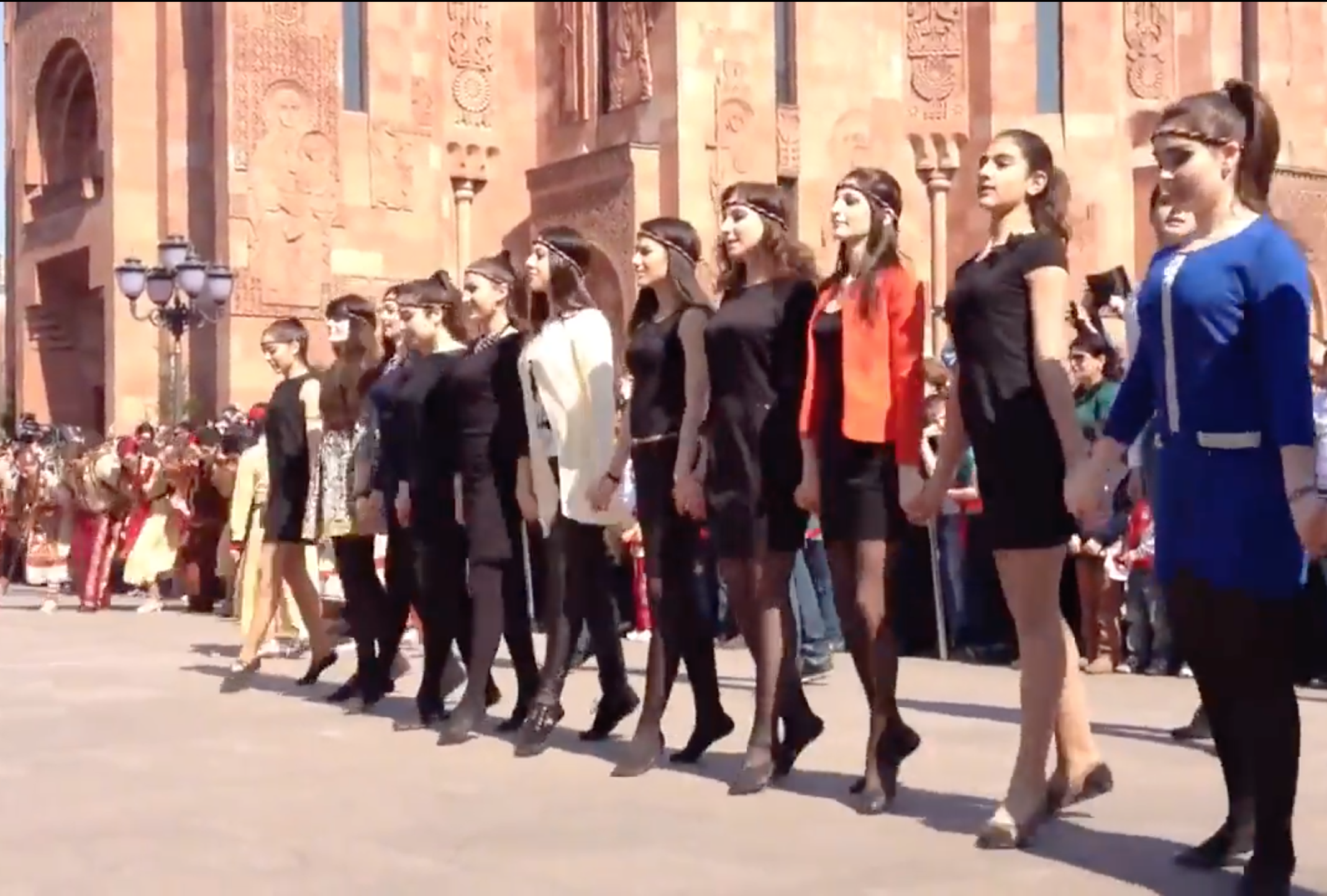
- Young Armenians dancing kochari in Yerevan
- Native name: Քոչարի
- Genre: Folk dance Circle dance
- Origin: Armenia

Kochari, traditional group dance
- UNESCO Intangible Cultural Heritage
- Country: Armenia
- Reference: 01295
- Region: Europe and North America

Inscription history
- Inscription: 2017 (12th session)
- List: Representative

Kochari (Armenian: Քոչարի, romanized: K'očari; Azerbaijani: Köçəri; Greek: Κότσαρι, romanized: Kótsari; Turkish: Koçari) is an Armenian folk dance originating in the Armenian Highlands. It is performed today by Armenians, while variants are performed by Assyrians, Azerbaijanis, and Pontic Greeks. It is a form of circle dance.

Each region in the Armenian Highlands had its own Kochari, with its unique way of both dancing and music.

== Etymology ==
- In Armenian, "Kochari" literally means "knee-come". Գուճ (gudj or goudj) means "knee" and արի (ari) means "come".
- In Azerbaijani Turkish, "köç" means "to move" used both as a verb and as a noun, with the latter used more in the context of nomads' travelling. "Köçəri" is also both an adjective and a noun, meaning a "nomad" and "nomadic" simultaneously.
- In Pontic Greek, from the Greek "κότσι" (in Pontic Greek "κοτς") meaning "heel" (from Medieval Greek "κόττιον" meaning the same) and "αίρω" meaning "raise", all together "raising the heel", since the Greeks consider the heel to be the main part of the foot which the dancer uses.

== Versions ==
John Blacking describes Kochari as follows:

Group dancing, when dancers imitate jumping goats, is known as kochari. Dancers stand abreast, holding each other's hands, The tempo of the dance ranges from moderate to fast. Squatting and butting an imagined opponent are followed by high jumps.

=== Armenian ===
A part of Armenian kochari

Armenians have been dancing Kochari for over a thousand years. The dance is danced by both men and women and is intended to be intimidating. More modern forms of Kochari have added a "tremolo step", which involves shaking the whole body. It spread to the eastern part of Armenia after the Armenian genocide. The Armenian Kochari has been included to the List of Intangible Cultural Heritage in Need of Urgent Safeguarding of UNESCO in 2017.

=== Azerbaijani ===
Today this dancing is played in the Nakhchivan land of which Sharur, Sadarak, Kangarli, Julfa and Shahbuz regions' folklore collectives and it is performed at weddings. Kochari along with tenzere has been included to the list of Intangible Cultural Heritage in Need of Urgent Safeguarding of UNESCO in November 2018 as versions of Yalli dance.

=== Pontic Greek Kόtsari ===
The Pontic Greeks and Armenians have many vigorous warlike dances such as the Kochari.

Unlike most Pontic dances, the Kotsari is in an even rhythm (2/4), originally danced in a closed circle.

== See also ==
- Kalamatianos
- Tsamiko
- Sirtaki
- Omal
- Horon
- Khigga
- An Dro
- Tamzara
- Hora
- Dabke
- Halay
- Assyrian folk dance
- Faroese dance

== Gallery ==
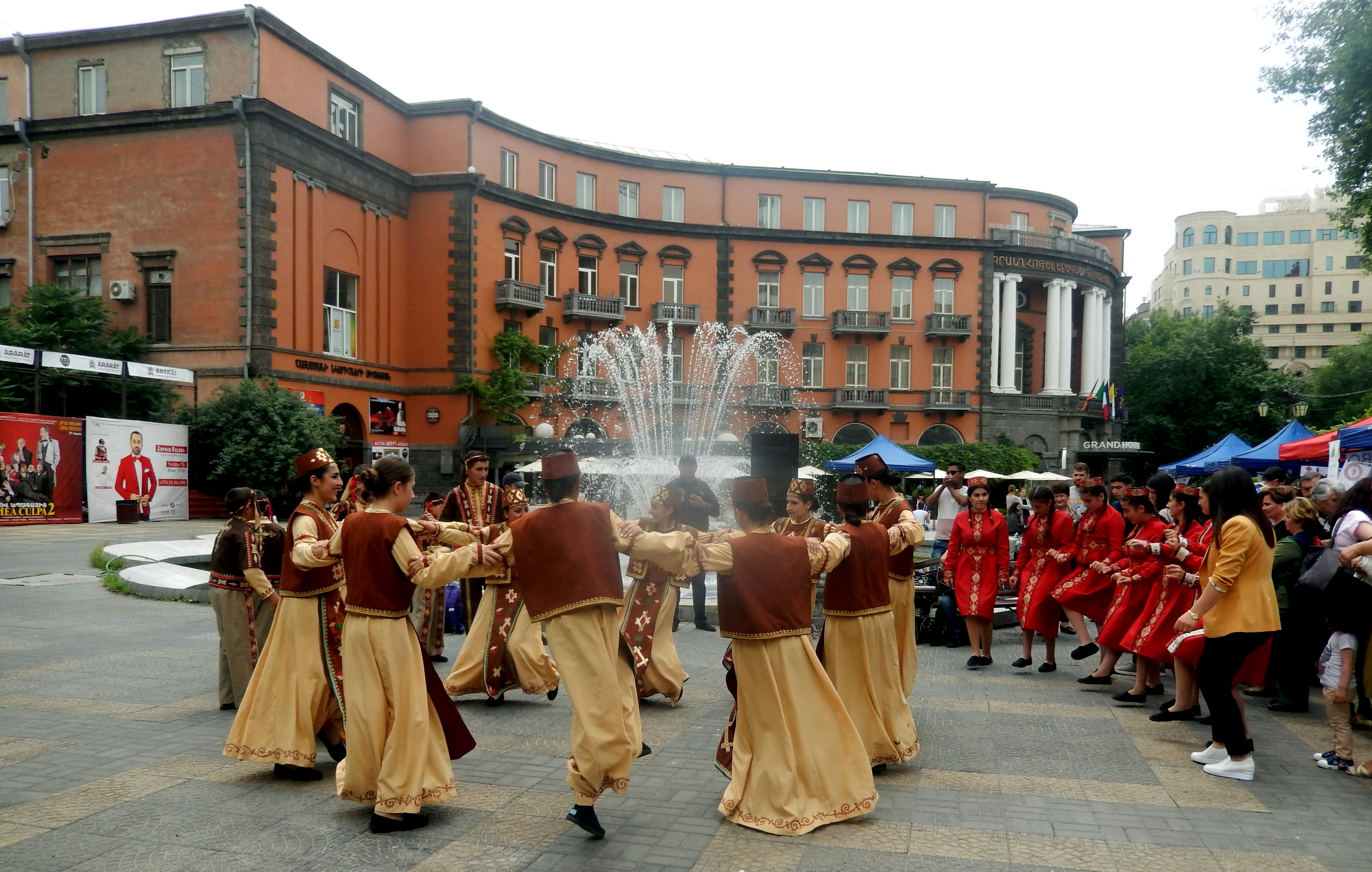
Kochari dance in Aznavour Square

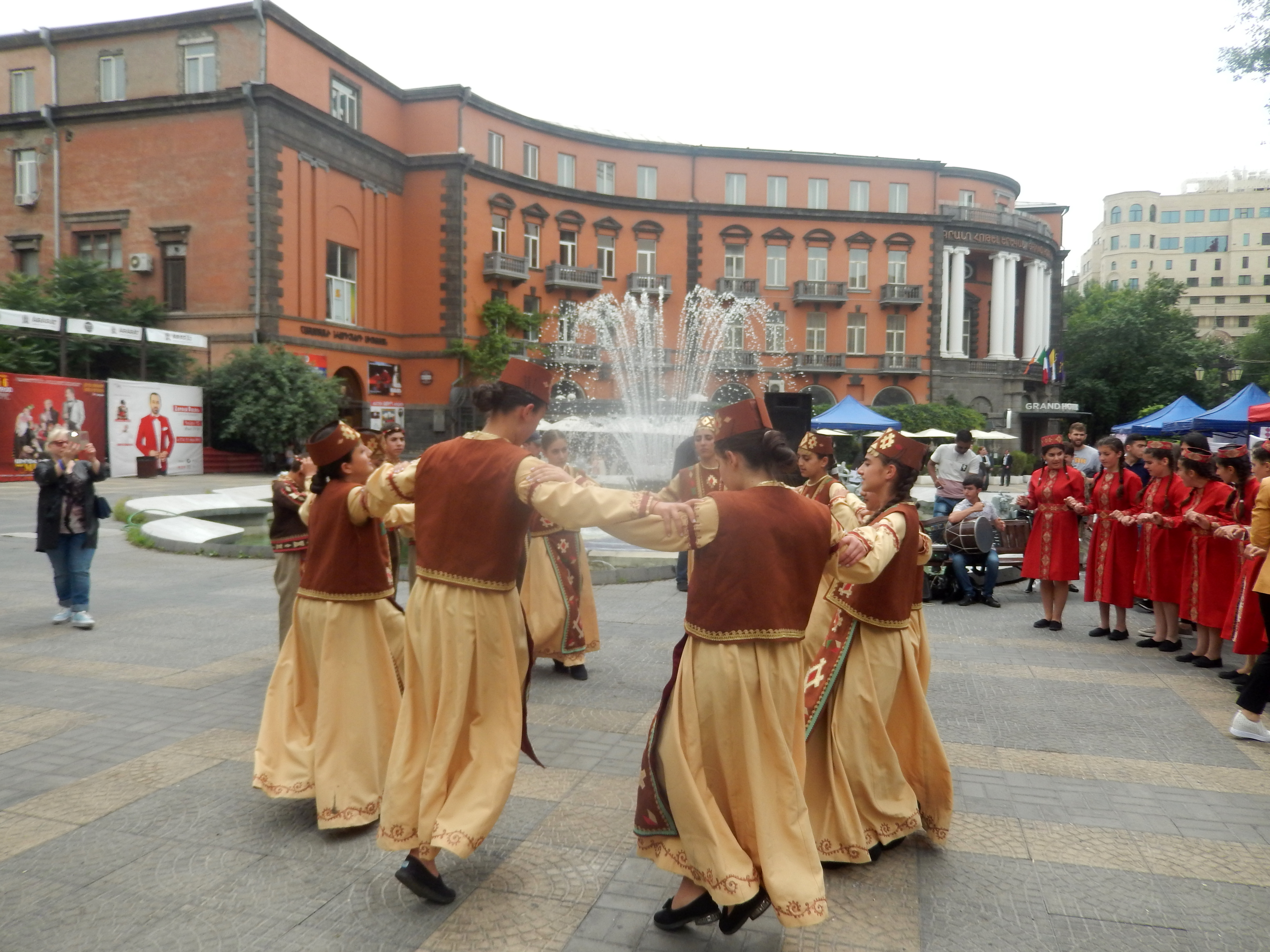
Kochari dance in Aznavour Square

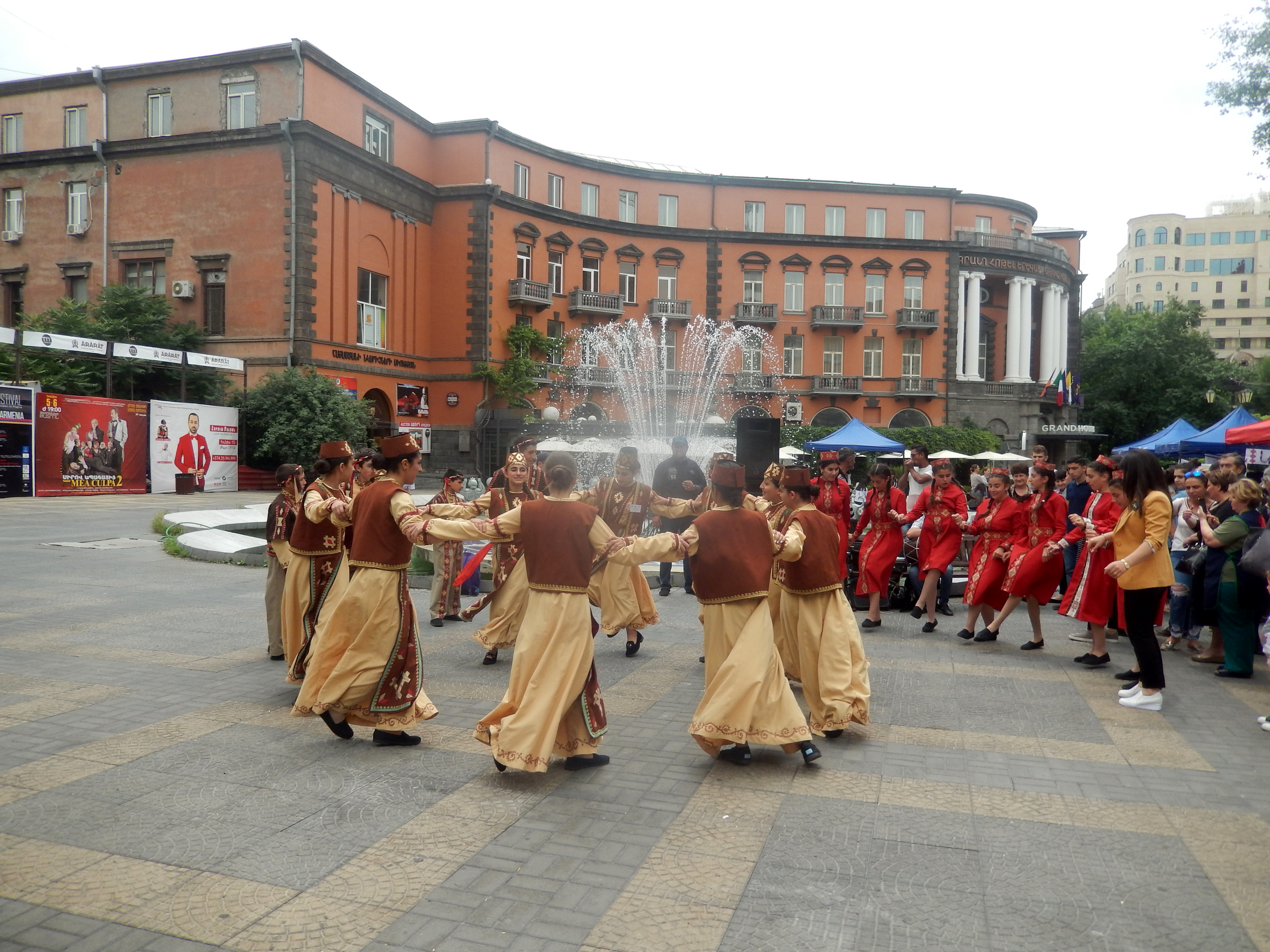
Kochari dance in Aznavour Square
