= Ashur Bet Sargis discography =

Discography of Assyrian musician Ashur Bet Sargis

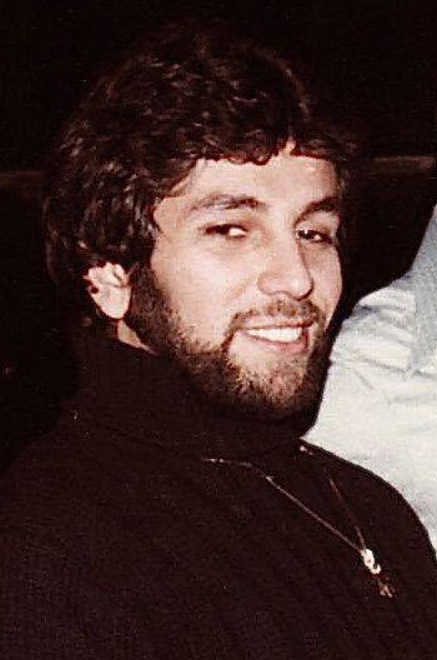
- Studio albums: 12
- EPs: 1
- Singles: 4

This article covers the discography of Assyrian musician Ashur Bet Sargis.

== Albums ==
=== Studio albums ===
Ashur Sings For Ancient Assyria (1975)
No.	Title	Lyrics	Length
1.	"Le Manshenakh"	Hormos Hormos	2:41
2.	"Bet Nahren"	Benyamin A. Malco	4:42
3.	"Libba Cheera"	Ashur Bet Sargis	6:15
4.	"Najib Soretta"	Ashur Bet Sargis	2:33
5.	"Bratit Shameran"	Youel Giwargis	4:04
6.	"Roosh Jwanqa"	Freydun Atturaya	4:08
7.	"Biawinakh Khayi"	Ashur Bet Sargis	4:54
8.	"Jwanqe Sawjol"	Rabi Rejena Younatan	4:59
9.	"Len Bekhshawa"	Sargon Shliemon	4:53

Tanili Lay Lay (1979) (Note: The Syriac/Assyrian writing for the album's cover was done by Ibrahim Namo Ibrahim)
No.	Title	Lyrics	Length
1.	"Tanilli Lay Lay (Dardakh Gorena)"	Freydun Atturaya	5:16
2.	"La Khashwat B Atee Youma"	Dona Sargon, Ashur Bet Sargis	3:21
3.	"Resha D Khigga K-Nablaleh"	Ashur Bet Sargis	5:27
4.	"Gepta D-Anwe (Romta D Khisha Klelee)"	Ashur Bet Sargis	3:45
5.	"Sogoltee Yimmie"	Malik Mirza	2:35
6.	"Door Kislee"	Ashur Bet Sargis	3:28
7.	"Ahela Younee"	Esho Warda	4:57
8.	"Alo La Mteele (Min Khobbee Qamaya)"	Ashur Bet Sargis	5:13

Riqda D'Ghaliboota (1984)
No.	Title	Lyrics	Length
1.	"Vazoy Vazoy"		4:01
2.	"B'yawinakh Khayee (Kma Qaira Pokha)"	Ashur Bet Sargis	6:13
3.	"Brata D'Khoolmani"	Ashur Bet Sargis	6:18
4.	"Ganta D'Wardeh"	Sami Yako	5:56
5.	"Riqda D'Ghaliboota"	Ashur Bet Sargis	6:18
6.	"Qasra D'Khoolma"	Ashur Bet Sargis	7:23
7.	"Berqadela O'Bishwara"	Ashur Bet Sargis	6:07

Pokha D'Sitwa (1990)
No.	Title	Lyrics	Music	Length
1.	"La Wee Showtdanaya"	Ashur Bet Sargis	Sarmen Arissian	4:47
2.	"Hala Leet"	Ashur Bet Sargis, Orahim Lazar	Sarmen Arissian	4:47
3.	"Loosh An Jolleh Sodaneh - Sharra"	Emmanuel Salmon	Sarmen Arissian	6:48
4.	"Danateh Sreekheh"	Esho Warda	Sarmen Arissian	5:56
5.	"Pokha Dsitwa"	Ashur Bet Sargis	Sarmen Arissian	7:07
6.	"Dakhy Qam Shoghatly"	Ashur Bet Sargis	Sarmen Arissian	6:01
7.	"Sara D'Matan"	John Homeh	Sarmen Arissian	4:34
8.	"Khayeh O Mota"	George Shanko	Sarmen Arissian	5:03

The Mighty Proud Assyrians (1992)
No.	Title	Lyrics	Music	Length
1.	"Prookh Rama Ya Nishra"	George Shanko	Sarmen Arissian	5:39
2.	"Qam Malpatlee"	Ashur Bet Sargis	Sarmen Arissian	6:36
3.	"Nissan Edan Qawmaya"	Sameeh Barcham	Sarmen Arissian	6:38
4.	"Dwikh Nawsha D'Zawaa"	Orahim Lazar	Sarmen Arissian	5:09
5.	"Doomara O'Ubalit"	Orahim Lazar	Sarmen Arissian	4:56
6.	"Roosh Jwanqa"			8:31

Nora Aldiyana (From a Distant World) (1995)
No.	Title	Lyrics	Music	Length
1.	"Malekty Tdleeta"	Shoshan Sarkis	Sarmen Arissian	5:18
2.	"Qamoo Deewat Belyamy"	Ashur Bet Sargis	Sarmen Arissian	7:21
3.	"Nora Aldyana"	Ashur Bet Sargis	Sarmen Arissian	7:36
4.	"Taarra D'Kholmany"	Wilson Eshay, Ashur Bet Sargis	Sarmen Arissian	6:19
5.	"Nahra D'Gazarta (Khaboor)"	Anwar Atto	Sarmen Arissian	5:57
6.	"Brata D'Bet Nahrin"	Shimon Keena	Sarmen Arissian	5:40

Ana Leywan Min Daha Donya (From A Distant World) (1996)
No.	Title	Lyrics	Music	Length
1.	"Shewoti"	Ashur Bet Sargis	Sarmen Arissian	6:45
2.	"Khobba D'Yimma"	Ashur Bet Sargis	Sarmen Arissian	6:19
3.	"Tdoowa"	Ashur Bet Sargis	Sarmen Arissian	6:22
4.	"Gamee D'Mowta"	Nahran M. Lazar	Sarmen Arissian	5:22
5.	"Zareera Lojana"	Ashur Bet Sargis	Sarmen Arissian	5:03
6.	"Ana Lewin Min D'Aha Donye"	Shimon Keena	Sarmen Arissian	9:14

Zmaryate D'Khoba M'tomaya (Immortal Memories) (1998)
No.	Title	Length
1.	"Tkharo Peshanih"	3:23
2.	"Libba Cheerah"	5:49
3.	"Aalo La Mtdeely"	5:23
4.	"Dur Kesly"	5:03
5.	"Brata D'Shamiram"	7:14
6.	"Giptah D'Anweh"	4:48
7.	"Qassra D'Kholma"	7:33
8.	"Len Bekhshawa"	4:52
9.	"Lenwa Bespara"	4:58
10.	"Kma Qayrah Pokha"	5:32

Dashta D'Nineveh (2008)
No.	Title	Lyrics	Music	Length
1.	"Sahda"	Ashur Bet Sargis	Sarmen Arissian	6:28
2.	"Nishwa"	Ashur Bet Sargis	Armen Ahoronian	5:16
3.	"Sehpaa"	Ashur Bet Sargis	Sarmen Arissian	6:56
4.	"Yoqra"	Ashur Bet Sargis	Armen Ahoronian	5:59
5.	"Sip'reh"	Ashur Bet Sargis	Sarmen Arissian	6:10
6.	"Ktawa Jo Shosha"	Ashur Bet Sargis	Armen Ahoronian	8:13
7.	"Dashta D'Nineveh"	Ashur Bet Sargis	Sarmen Arissian	5:40
8.	"Qup'pas"	Ashur Bet Sargis	Armen Ahoronian	7:12
9.	"Tin'na"	Ashur Bet Sargis	Sarmen Arissian	7:19
10.	"La Lakha Letwa"	Ashur Bet Sargis	Sarmen Arissian	5:30
11.	"TDa'alta"	Ashur Bet Sargis	Armen Ahoronian	6:38
12.	"Yim'me"	Ashur Bet Sargis	Armen Ahoronian	4:40

Nishmi (2017)
No.	Title	Lyrics	Music	Length
1.	"Nishmi"	Solaka Stephan	Ashur Bandoleros	7:00
2.	"Modewa Nesha"	Ashur Bet Sargis	Ashur Bandoleros	5:39
3.	"Sehbota"	Ashur Bet Sargis	Ashur Bandoleros	6:38
4.	"Khoba Shapera"	Ashur Bet Sargis	Ashur Bandoleros	5:02
5.	"Akmaleh"	Ashur Bet Sargis	Ashur Bandoleros	6:06
6.	"Malikta D'marra"	Ashur Bet Sargis	Ashur Bandoleros	4:07
7.	"Khikhwa Rama"	Ashur Bet Sargis	Ashur Bandoleros	5:17
8.	"Sara Khata"	Ashur Bet Sargis	Ashur Bandoleros	4:05
9.	"Hala Leten"	Ashur Bet Sargis	Ashur Bandoleros	4:13

Tarpa (2020)
No.	Title	Lyrics	Music	Length
1.	"Matehni"	Ashur Bet Sargis	Ashur Bandoleros	5:18
2.	"Mani Baiyeh Khoba"	Ashur Bet Sargis	Ashur Bandoleros	4:10
3.	"Dorasha"	Ashur Bet Sargis	Ashur Bandoleros	4:29
4.	"Gira"	Ashur Bet Sargis	Ashur Bandoleros	4:46
5.	"Tarpa"	Ashur Bet Sargis	Ashur Bandoleros, Ninef Arsanos	5:23
6.	"Qaribaya"	Ashur Bet Sargis	Ashur Bandoleros	4:09
7.	"Nishra D'Tkhomeh"	Freydun Atturaya	Ashur Bandoleros	6:32
8.	"Brata D'Kholmani (Remix 2020)"	Ashur Bet Sargis	Ninef Arsanos, Lawrence Mansour	4:33

=== Compilation albums ===
Best Of Ashur Bet Sargis (1996)
No.	Title	Length
1.	"Tkharo Peshané"
2.	"Lebba Chero"
3.	"Alo La Meteeli"
4.	"Dour Kesli"
5.	"Brata D'Shamiram"
6.	"Gipta D'Anwe"
7.	"Qasra D'Khoolma"
8.	"Len Bekhshawa"
9.	"Lenwa Bispara"
10.	"B'Yawinakh Khayee"

Everything So Far (2003)
No.	Title	Length

== EPs ==
Ashur Sargis Sings For Bet Nahren (1972)
No.	Title	Lyrics	Length
1.	"Tani Li Ly Ly (first Version)"	Freydun Atturaya	5:10
2.	"Dardy Mayre"	Esha Zaya	4:44
3.	"Bet Nahren"	Benyamin Malco	7:26
4.	"B'demmit Aynati"	Goriel Shomun	5:51

== Singles ==
Title	Release
"Prookh Rama Ya Nishra (Remix)"	2022
"Tawani" "Shiklow" "Ayni Tosh'yeh'le"	2023

== Other appearances ==
=== Guest appearances ===
Year	Album	Artist
1973	Get Up And Dance	Darius Satloo
