= Syriac music =

Syriac music may refer to:

- Assyrian folk/pop music
- Syriac sacral music

== See also ==
- Assyrian music (disambiguation)
