= Shamiram =

Shamiram may refer to:

- Shamiram, Armenia
- Shamiram (legend), a legendary Assyrian queen
  - Shammuramat, the real Assyrian queen she was based on
- Shamiram Urshan (1938–2011), Assyrian singer
- Shamiram, a political party in Armenia, founded before the 1995 parliamentary election and dissolved in 2008
