= Assyrian folk-pop music =

Music genre

Assyrian folk-pop
- Stylistic origins: Assyrian music
- Cultural origins: 1950s, Middle East
- Derivative forms: Assyrian folk music, Assyrian classic music, Assyrian pop music

Assyrian folk/pop music, also known as Assyrian folk-pop, is the musical style of the Assyrian people derived from traditional music that includes a broad range of stylistic varieties, which would also encompass fusions of Western genres such as pop, electronic, Latin, jazz and/or classical music, with a melodic basis of Assyrian folk.

== Background ==
Assyrian folk music claims to be the descendant of the music of their ancient Upper Mesopotamian ancestors that has survived in the liturgical music of the Syriac Churches. Assyrian songs are generally sung in Iraqi Koine, a standard variety of Assyrian Neo-Aramaic. However, older songs mostly had an Urmian dialect and tribal-folk music tend to contain Tyari dialects. Themes tend to focus on longing, melancholy, strife and love issues. Assyrian songs are usually lengthy, tending to be around 5 minutes long on average.

== Composition ==
Assyrian folk can also be found in traditional Middle Eastern makams, and it has similarities to other folk music in Western Asia, such as Kurdish, Turkish, Persian, and Armenian music. Unlike most Western music, Assyrian music includes quarter tones halfway between notes, often through the use of instruments or the human voice. Modern Assyrian pop music is mostly written in the minor key, and would typically use the Phrygian scale, as well as the harmonic minor scale. The Aeolian mode (i.e. the natural minor scale) is somewhat rare, although it has been used more in the past. Some songs by Evin Agassi at the turn of the millennium had profusely used the Andalusian cadence due to influence of Latin pop at the time.

=== Rhythm ===
Assyrian dance music (particularly khigga) has a rhythm or beat that is similar to a swing/shuffle, a galloping jazz and blues rhythm. Whereas, the faster-paced gubareh beat can be compared to the Irish jig. The sheikhani beat uses a rhythm that is analogous to dembow, a dance rhythm in reggaeton music. Solos are common in Assyrian music and they are usually protracted. Instrumentation is mostly arranged with a keyboard and electronic drums, namely in weddings or parties. Although many forms of Assyrian records do use acoustic and orchestral instruments such as strings, pianos, saxophones and violins.

== History ==
=== Folkloric period ===
Assyrian folk music is omnipresent in the village scene. A "musician" is not necessarily a professional, whoever can sing in any manner is considered a "singer". Most of the time, music is learned by ear and passed down as an oral tradition. Village music may be categorized, basically, into four groups: local secular music not related to specific occasions; functional music; religious music and hymns; and music adopted from other areas.

Here are a few types of tribal Assyrian Music that has survived to this day, especially in the Assyrian villages and towns of northern Iraq, southeastern Turkey, northwestern Iran and northeastern Syria:

- Raweh: An ancient melodic chant which features wailing echoed voices, usually of a male. Raweh is reminiscent of how one's voice echoes in a valley between mountains.
- Zurna O Dawolah: These are two traditional music instruments, literally meaning a drum and wind-pipe (or flute). They are played together, either with or without singing in many ceremonies such as weddings, welcoming and, albeit rarely, funerals.
- Diwaneh: Sung in gatherings and meetings; lyrics cover aspects of life such as, working in the fields, persecution, suffering, religion.
- Lilyana: Wedding songs usually sung by women only, especially for the bride before leaving her home to get married. Also sung for the bridegroom the day before his wedding by his family and relatives.
- Tanbur: Another tribal music instrument, a string instrument with long neck, originated in ancient Assyria, discovered being depicted on carving from South Iraq from Ur to Akkad and Ashur. Albert Rouel Tamraz was a famous Assyrian singer from Iraq who played this instrument and sung many folkloric songs accompanied by hand-drum (tabla).

It was in the Assyrian homeland north of Mosul that people started to write the vernacular, more than two hundred years before the earliest British missionaries, although the earliest records of the Syriac language date from 5th century BC Achaemenid Assyria. The earliest dated text is a poem written in 1591. This makes early Neo-Aramaic literature a contemporary of Jewish Neo-Aramaic literature from roughly the same region, dating back to the late 16th century.

The Neo-Aramaic literature which existed before the arrival of British and American missionaries consisted mainly of poetry. This poetry can be divided into three categories: stanzaic hymns, dispute poems, and drinking songs. Of these three categories, only the hymns, which in Neo-Aramaic are termed duriky; and which can be seen as the equivalent of the Classical Syriac madrase, can usually be traced back to individual authors.

=== Modern Assyrian Music ===
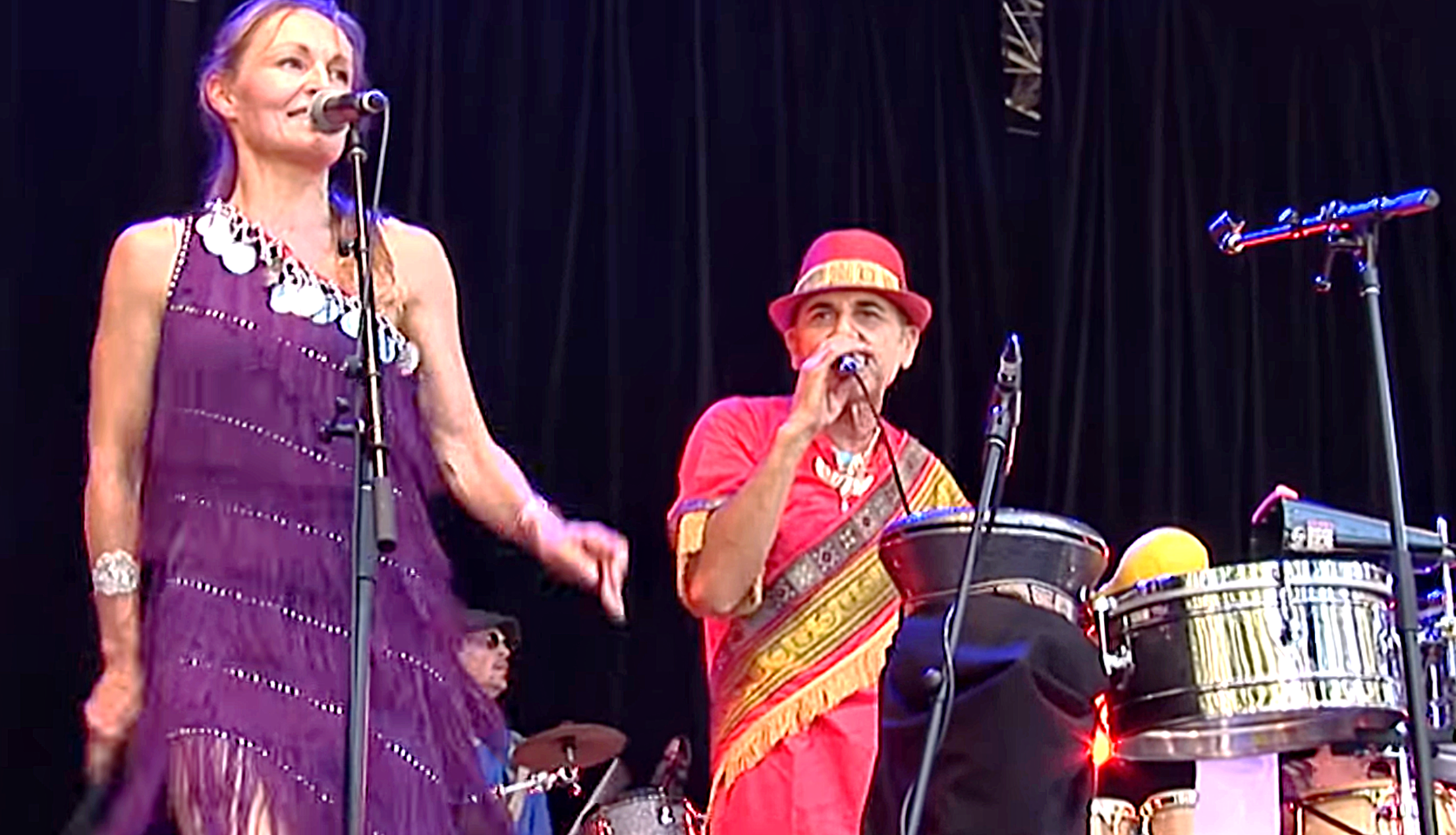
Assyrian Australian band Azadoota has incorporated both Assyrian folk rhythm and style with Latin and rock flavour

World War I, and the resulting Assyrian genocide, drove many Assyrians out from the mountainous region of Hakkari, southeastern Turkey to the regions of northern Iraq and northeastern Syria. World War II brought them in direct contact with the west, especially the British Army in Iraq, Russians in Urmia and the French in Syria. The contact with the British caused the most influence on modern Assyrian music, especially the period after the independence of Iraq in 1932, which brought British oil companies into Iraq and they employed many by now English speaking Assyrians. At this time they came in contact with Western music and instruments. Assyrian youth started picking up and playing these new instruments after seeing and hearing the British playing. Assyrian youths started to find new bands and to play in parties, picnics and other functions for both Assyrians and others.

Gabriel Asaad was the pioneer of Assyrian music and composed the first Assyrian song in the Turoyo language, Othuroye Ho Mtoth Elfan l-Metba‘ (1926, ܐܬܘܪܝܶܐ ܗܐ ܡܛܬ ܐܠܦܢ ܠܡܛܒܥ "Assyrians, Our ship is on the way to sink"). In Baghdad, Iraq the earliest known record is by Hanna Patros in 1931 – perhaps two Gramophones (78 rpm) with 2 songs on each (church hymns and folk songs). Called “"Karuzuta d-khasha". Hanna Petros (1896–1958), later became the music director at the conservatory in Baghdad. There were church hymns and folklore songs with a musical company on the records. Albert Rouel Tamras releases his first records in Baghdad in 1966 on Bashirphone label owned by Jameil Bashir an Assyrian Iraqi oud and violin soloist. Singing in the background with Albert are Biba and Sargon Gabriel, two singers who would later become notable figures in modern Assyrian music in the United States. Contemporaneously, Evin Agassi was also making music in Iran during the 1950s and 1960s.

From the 1970s and onward, Assyrian music started to incorporate elements from Western popular music, such as British and American music. Jermain Tamraz, originally from Iran, was the first Assyrian artist to arrive to Australia to record Assyrian music. Genres such as soft rock, pop ballads and dance pop became popular from 1980s and onward, although they all still had elements of Assyrian folk. In the 1990s and 2000s, Assyrian artists routinely fused in the traditional sounds of zurna and dawola conjured by electronic keyboards, as synthesized music got popular at that time. The Latin genre became popular in the late 1990s with instruments such as the Flamenco guitar being featured abundantly in Assyrian songs. Rock music never became popular in the Assyrian music scene, although a few Assyrian songs have featured electric guitars. Despite rock's unpopularity, there exists an Assyrian-Armenian metal band called Melechesh, which has extensive Assyrian-Mesopotamian influences both lyrically and instrumentally.

It is customary for modern Assyrian artists to generally sing in Iraqi Koine, or "Standard Assyrian" (which is based on the prestigious Urmian dialect but has influences of the Hakkari dialects), for them to be intelligible and have widespread recognition. Songs in mountainous dialects, such as Tyari, are usually of the folk-dance music genre and would attract certain audiences. Due to Arab influence, some Assyrian singers may incorporate mawwal in their music.

== List of Assyrian singers ==
- Janan Sawa (b. 1956) Assyrian singer from Iraq based in America
- Faia Younan (b. 1992) Assyrian singer from Syria based in Sweden
- Shamiram Urshan (1938–2011) Assyrian singer and entertainer from Iran based in California
- Acrassicauda, USA-based Iraqi thrash-metal band formed in 2001
- Evin Agassi (1945–2024)
- Gabriel Asaad (1907–97)
- Ashur Bet Sargis (b. 1949)
- Rola Bahnam - Lebanon-based TV-presenter and singer with The 4 Cats
- Jamil Bashir (1920–77)
- Munir Bashir (1930–97)
- Aril Brikha (b. 1976) - Assyrian Techno/House music artist
- George Chaharbakhshi (b. 1952)
- Sargon Gabriel (b. 1947)
- Linda George (b. 1964)
- Claudia Hanna - Assyrian singer of Arabic & Assyrian music, based in Egypt
- Nouri Iskandar (1938–2023)
- Elias Karam (b. 1960)
- Paulus Khofri (1923–2000)
- Melechesh – Assyrian/Armenian black-metal/Mizrahi metal band, formed 1993 in Jerusalem, currently in Amsterdam
- Adwar Mousa (b. 1950)
- Abeer Nehme (b. 1980)
- Hanna Patros (1896-1958), in the 1930s and 1940s
- Ninsun Poli (active from 2004)
- Timz (real name Tommy Hanna, b. 1985) – Assyrian American Rap musician
- Marganita Vogt-Khofri (b. 1952)
- Elias Zazi (b. 1964)
- Juliana Jendo (b. 1952)
- Wadih El Safi (1921-2013)
- Azadoota, Sydney based Assyrian band, formed in 1996
- Fairuz (b. 1934/1935) Famous Assyrian-Lebanese singer who grew up in Lebanon. Her father was an ethnic Assyrian from Mardin who fled the Assyrian Genocide of 1915 and belonged to the Syriac Orthodox Church. She sings mostly in Arabic but has sung hymns in her native Western Syriac dialect.
- Jean Karat (1949–2003)

== See also ==
- Turkish pop music
- Iranian pop music
- Kurdish music
- Arab pop music
- Armenian pop music
- Assyrian folk dance
