= Sargon Gabriel =

Sargon Gabriel ܣܪܓܘܢ ܓܒܪܐܝܠ
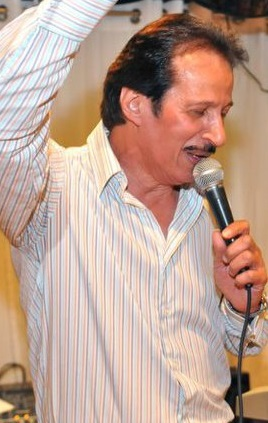
- In 2012

Background information
- Born: Sargon Gabriel; 1947; Habbaniyah, Kingdom of Iraq
- Origin: Habbaniyah, Iraq
- Genres: Assyrian, folk dance
- Years active: 1963 - Present
- Website: www.sargongabriel.com

Sargon Gabriel (Assyrian Neo-Aramaic: ܣܪܓܘܢ ܓܒܪܐܝܠ:born 1947) is an Assyrian musician whose music style usually involves traditional Assyrian folk-pop music with the instruments, zurna and dawoola.

== History ==
Sargon Gabriel began singing as a teenager and made his first appearance on live television at the age 17 in Baghdad, Iraq. He began singing backup on albums for another Assyrian singer, Albert Ruel Tamras, before starting his career as a solo singer and even did a cover of Albert Ruel Tamras's famous song, "Asmar, Asmar" in his 1987 album entitled Way Way Minnakh.

Sargon Gabriel has also been featured singing with other famous Assyrian singers including Linda George, and Janan Sawa; in fact, he helped bolster Linda George's singing career when he featured her in the track, "Dalale" in his album of the same name released in 1981. He has been singing for over thirty years and has released over twenty albums. His first album was released in 1973. His songs have become very popular in the Assyrian community upon the release of his first albums and his songs are often sung by other musicians at weddings, parties, and other social gatherings.

== Personal life ==
The singer currently resides in Chicago, Illinois.

== Discography ==
- Yimma Yimma (1973)
- Atouraya (1976)
- Nineveh (1978) (1978)
- Shlama Aturaya (1980)
- Dalaleh (1981)
- Ganta D-Perdeisa (1982)
- Khooyada D-Omta (1983)
- Parzona (1984)
- Sara (1985)
- Way Way Minnakh (1987)
- Neqda (1989)
- Leeshana D-Yimma (1991)
- Kertey (1992)
- Nineveh (1994) (1994)
- Shooshla (1996)
- Darwid (1997)
- The Greatest Songs (1998)
- The Legend Continues (2002)
- Perdaisa (2004)
- Live In Sydney (2004)
- Al Balee (2006)
- Bassy Bassy (2010)
- Shoryen Zmara (2012)
