= George Chaharbakhshi =

- Born: 1952 (age 72–73)
- Origin: Tehran, Iran
- Genres: Assyrian music, Latin jazz
- Occupation: Singer
- Years active: 1970s–present

George Chaharbakhshi (Syriac: ܓܘܪܓ ܟܗܪܒܟܫܝ; Persian: جرج چهاربخشی; Greek: Γεώργιος Χαχαρμπάκσι; born 1952) is an Assyrian singer active in the United States. His 70s and 80s songs usually incorporated Latin instrumentation and rhythm.

== Biography ==
George Chaharbakhshi was born in Tehran, Iran in 1952 to an Assyrian father, Wilson Chaharbakhshi, and a Greek mother, Helen Chaharbakhshi. After finishing high school in Iran he continued his studies at the University of Illinois, Chicago. It was during his college years that he formed his own band which gained popularity among the Assyrian community in the United States. His popularity grew after releasing his first album in the 1970s and he has performed in several countries for the Assyrian diaspora.
