= Elias Zazi =

Swedish-Assyrian composer and music theorist

Elias Zazi (born 1964 in Beirut, Lebanon) is a Swedish-Assyrian composer and a theorist in music. Zazi also teaches music and works as a music critic and writer to a daily newspaper in Södertälje, Sweden.

== History ==
Elias began his journey as a discjockey in 1981 and two years later he won the title "Stockholm's No 1 DJ 1983-1984" which was arranged by the in-spot place called Studion in St. Eriksplan in Stockholm.

In 1985 his interest of Oriental music awakened. Elias Zazi who was raised in the sixties in Lebanon was already acquainted with the Arabic music and the Syriac Orthodox Church music. At the beginning of the eighties he began his studies of music and its essence. In 1994 he composed "Alfo Gabe D Howelan" (lyrics by Malfono Touma Nahroyo) which became a dance in the theatre group Ha Nison's play called "Warm soup with politics". In 1995-1996 he composed "The Dream Sonata", the first Syriac musical operetta in two acts which played on the stage of Estrad, Södertälje in May 1996.

After the Dream Sonata, Zazi began his studies of western music. He studied western music theories, harmonies, contra-point and more, and later he complemented his studies with sessions in composition for the composer John Lidström, and wrote several small pieces and a cantata for choir song with multiple vocals accompanied by a chamber ensemble. Moreover he composed some melodies for different occasions. Among his works are the song "Mardoutho", originally composed for the opening of the Assyrian Cultural Hall, and the half-hour musical program, which initiated a political congress in Södertälje in 2000 where "Invention" and "Ema Safrone g zomrina" were included among many others. At that time (1997–2001) Zazi was also performing theatre with Enhörna Teater group.

Zazi's production, “Yearning of the Dawn” for String Quartet, was performed on the stage of Estrad in Södertälje in November 2003 and was very appreciated by the audience and the critics who considered it the best of Zazi's works in the form of western music. “Yearning of the Dawn” was performed two more times in Södertälje. In November 2009, his expressive and emotional work “Tone of Passion” for Piano Trio, was performed on the same stage in Södertälje.

Elias Zazi gives seminaries about Assyrian/Syriac folk music and he also hosts a talk-show on Suroyo TV, (Hotbird). In this programme “Zabno w amne”.
