= Assyrian music =

Assyrian music may refer to:

- Music of Mesopotamia, is a music in ancient Assyria
- Assyrian folk/pop music
- Syriac sacral music, sacral music in Syriac Christianity

== See also ==
- Syriac music (disambiguation)
