= Elias Karam =

Elias Karam الياس كرم
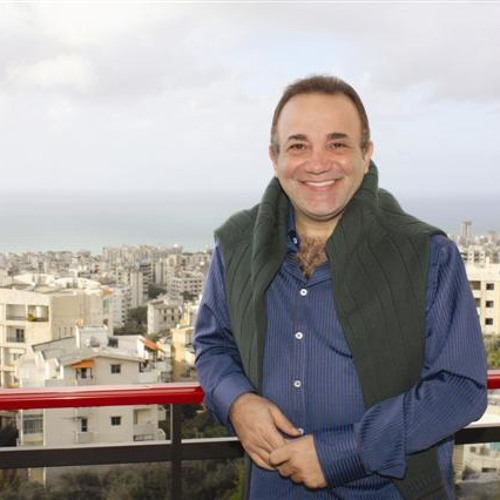
- Elias Karam

Background information
- Born: Elias Karam; 1960 (age 65–66); Al-Hasakah, Syria
- Genres: Arabic pop music, Arabic Tarab, Arabic music, Middle Eastern music, Syrian, Dabke
- Years active: 1982 – present

Elias Karam (Arabic: الياس كرم) (born 1960) is an Assyrian singer from Syria, born in the city of Al-Hasakah in the Northeastern governorate of Al-Hasakah.

== Biography ==
Elias was born Syria in the Northeastern governorate of Al-Hasakah. He learned playing Oud from his father and was inspired by Wadih El Safi at a young age, prompting him to write his first song at 16. After turning professional at the age of 20, Elias started composing music. His wrote the song ‘Amari, Tarab ya kalbi and Koullon ‘anak saalouni. Elias has toured all over the Arab world, Canada, United States, and a number of European countries. He also appeared in some TV series in Syria.
