= Ninsun Poli =

Swedish-Assyrian singer and songwriter

Ninsun Poli is a Swedish-Assyrian singer and songwriter raised in Tumba, Botkyrka, a suburb of Stockholm, Sweden. This soul and R&B artist made her debut at Hultsfred Festival 2004 in Sweden followed by performances at Stockholm's Berns, Lydmar, Alcazar and Nalen and at Malmö Festival in Malmö in summer of 2006.

Ninsun Poli writes most of her own material but has also collaborated with her brother Nabu Poli who is a member of Mili Mili World Music. She recorded her EP For Real in Los Angeles.

== Reviews ==
- Make sure you see her before she heads for bigger stages because it's just to face the fact: A star is born... ~Johan & Akesson, DN (2005)
- Incredibly impressive and clearly performed...Naturally she has big success to expect... ~Fredrik Eriksson, Groove (2004)
- Ninsun Poli: 18 years-old basketball girl from Stockholm with a voice that should go for export...The next Swedish hope for soul music? ~Pelle Gustafsson, Swedish National Radio (2003)

== See also ==
- List of Assyrians
