= Ashur Bet Sargis =

Ashur Bet Sargis ܐܫܘܪ ܒܝܬ ܣܪܓܝܣ
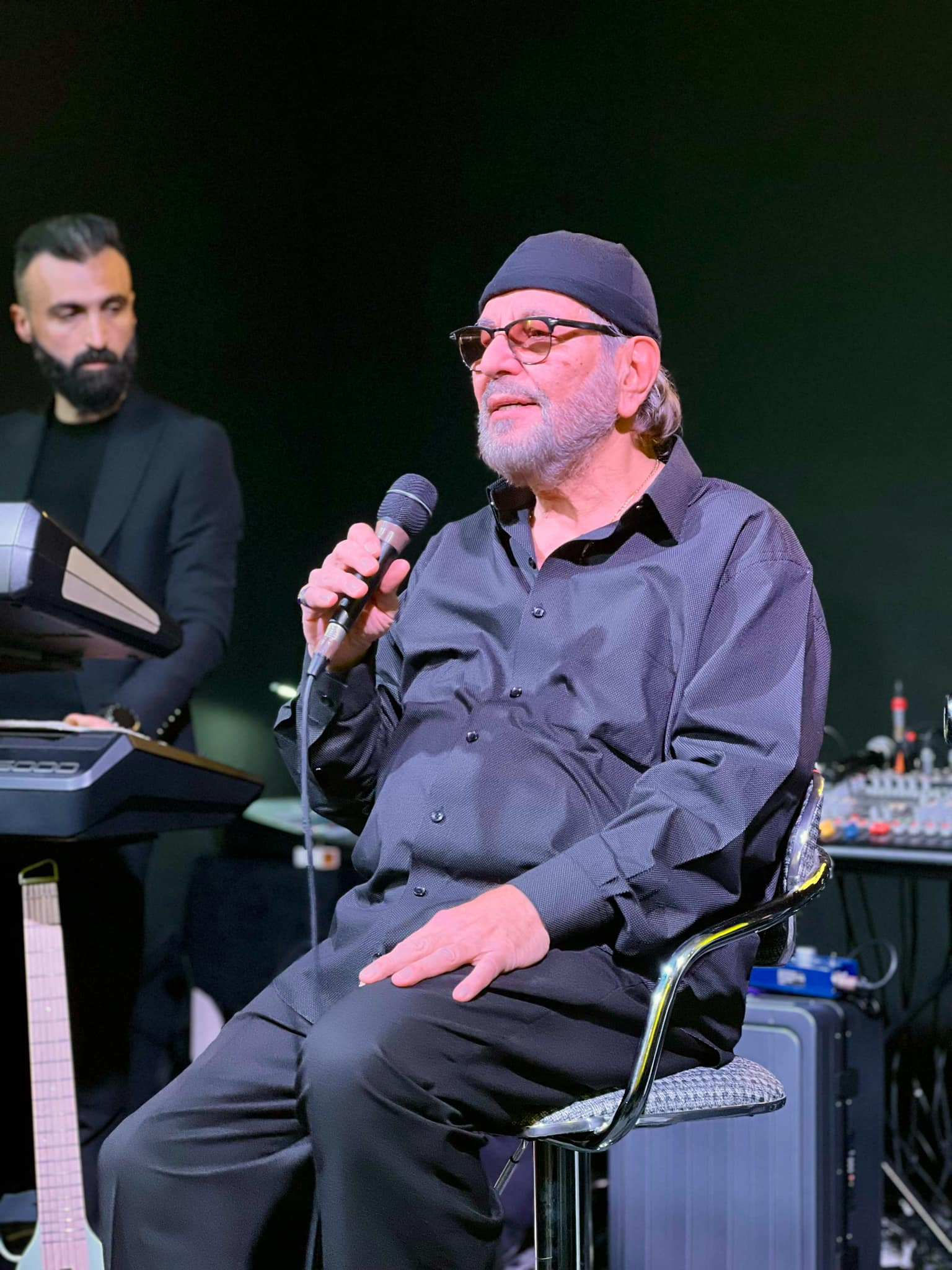
- Sargis performing in Ankawa in 2025

Background information
- Born: July 2, 1949 (age 76); Baghdad, Iraq
- Genres: Assyrian music, folk, soft rock
- Occupation(s): Composer, singer, songwriter, political activist
- Years active: 1960s–present

Ashur Bet Sargis (Note: Sometimes referred to as Ashur Sargis, without the family name affix "bêṯ".) (Syriac: ܐܫܘܪ ܒܝܬ ܣܪܓܝܤ; born July 2, 1949) is an Assyrian singer, composer, guitarist and activist. He became famous in the Assyrian communities worldwide for his nationalistic songs in the 1970s. His career peaked, and became prominent, in the 1990s with five albums released within that decade.

His songs usually tend to be sentimental ballads and anthems, although he has made many folk dance music as well. To the contrast of his Assyrian peers in music, Sargis's music is slow and mellow. He is also known for incorporating Greek instruments such as the tambouras into his music.

== Early career in Iraq ==
Ashur Bet Sargis was born in Baghdad, Iraq to an Assyrian family who was originally from Habbaniyah. He started playing the organ as a teenager at the local Assyrian church. He later began composing nationalistic songs under the influence of established Assyrian musicians such as Evin Aghassi and King Biba, as well as western artists. As Sargis recalls of his early days in the biography written for his album Everything So Far:

Music was being redefined out in the rest of the world, and stars like Elvis, Paul Anka, and of course The Beatles were shining all over the place. I wanted to be a part of this transformation, and offer its fruition to my people.

== Rise to fame ==
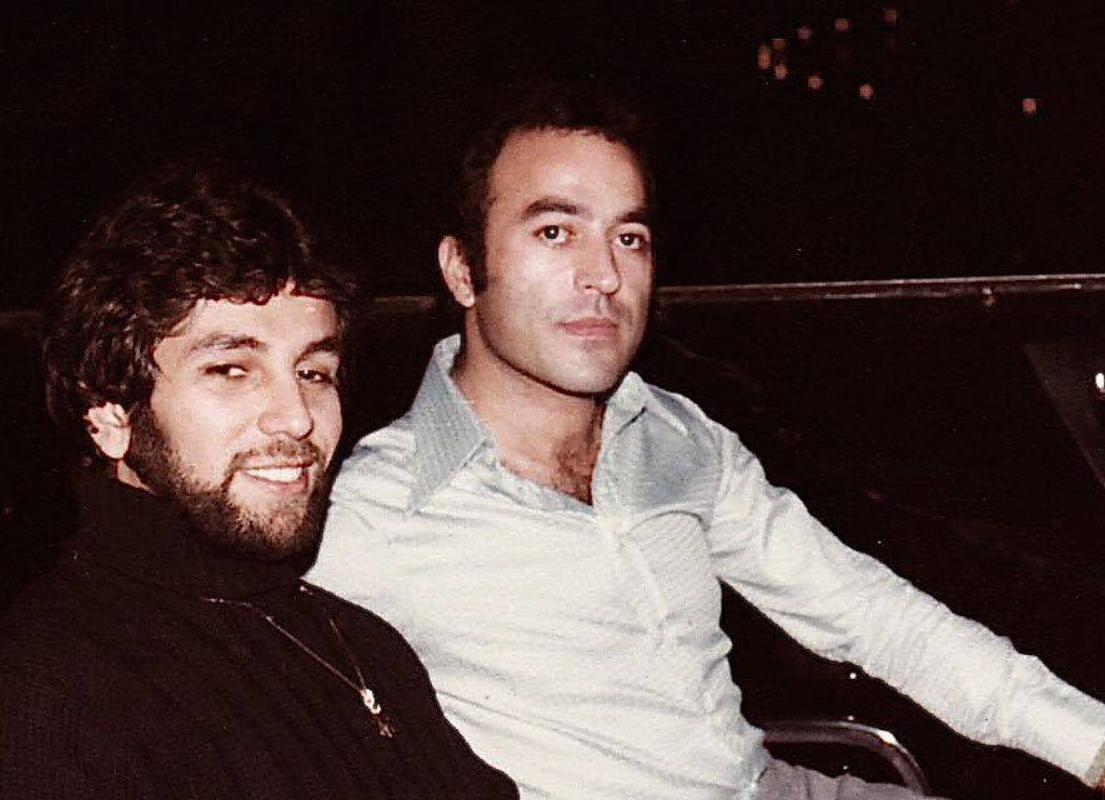
Ashur sitting next to Assyrian singer Evin Agassi

Shortly after the Ba'ath-led revolution of 1968, Sargis fled the unstable political situation in Iraq in 1969, ending up in Chicago, United States. A year later he formed his first band, "East Bird Band", which released its first recording in 1972. He relocated to Los Angeles in 1973 and in 1975 released his first LP Ashur Sargis Sings for Ancient Assyria which contained nationalistic songs like "Roosh Jwanqa" and "Bet Nahren Atrewa", written by Benyamin Mako, as well as several other songs that have since become staples of his catalog and concerts.

In 1976, Sargis became the first Assyrian artist to tour overseas when he and his band played three sold-out shows in Australia. Soon afterward he would travel to Iran, which at that time had the second largest population of Assyrians in the Middle East, and had long been a large producer of Assyrian music on the record labels that flourished in Tehran in the days before the Islamic Revolution. After two weeks of performances there, he returned to Los Angeles to record his third album, Sing Me a Lullaby. He followed it with Dance of Victory in 1984.

== Later years ==
Sargis is known for his staunch support for Zowaa and has composed several songs for the party. He also returned to Northern Iraq many times where he gave many concerts during Kha b-Nisan, before the Iraq War. He is often featured at Zowaa-sponsored festivals in the Nineveh Plains and the Dohuk Governorate. Sargis currently resides in Los Angeles, California.

== Discography ==
Excerpt from "Brata Shammiram"
A music sample of Bet Sargis' voice in 1975.

Studio Albums

- 1972 – Bet Nahren ("Mesopotamia")
- 1975 – Ancient Assyria ( Atour Atiqa)
- 1979 – Sing Me a Lullaby (Tanili Lay Lay)
- 1984 – Dance of Victory (Riqda d'Ghaliboota)
- 1990 – Winter Wind (Pokha d'Sitwa)
- 1992 – The Mighty Assyrians
- 1995 – Mirror of Deception (Nora Aldyana)
- 1996 – From a Distant World (Ana Lewin Min Daha Dunyeh)
- 1998 – Immortal Memories (Zmaryeta d'Khoba Mtomaya)
- 2008 – Dashta D'Nineveh (Nineveh Plains)
- 2016 – Nishmi (My Breath)
- 2020 - Tarpa (Leaf)

Singles

- 2014 – Hala Leten
- 2020 – Yalikhtoh Smoqta Zardeh
- 2022 – Prookh Rama Ya Nishra (Remix) (Fly High Oh Eagle)
- 2023 – Shiklow
- 2023 – Tawani (My Room)
- 2023 – Ayni Tosh'yeh'le (My Eyes Hid)

Compilation(s)

- 2003 – Everything So Far (Kol'Mindi Hal Hadyia)
