= Janan Sawa =

- Born: Janan Sawa Mansour; March 18, 1956 (age 70); Dohuk, Iraq
- Origin: Dohuk, Iraq
- Genre: Syriac folk music
- Years active: 1972–present

Janan Sawa (born March 18, 1956) (Syriac: ܔܢܐܢ ܒܒܐ ܣܒ݂ܐ) is an Assyrian musician who is noted for making Assyrian folk dance. Janan started singing in 1972, at the age of 17. Janan has performed throughout the world, and has visited his hometown of Duhok in Iraq on many occasions.

== Biography ==
In 1975, Janan's father forced him to marry. He spent 4 years in the Iraqi Army, from 1974 to 1978. In 1980, Janan fled Iraq shortly after Saddam came into power and settled in Greece for 2 years. He finally left for the United States in 1982, where he remains a resident. After arriving in the U.S., Janan worked as a taxicab driver for 2 years. In 1984, he was hired by a restaurant to sing on a nightly basis. In 1985, he recorded his first studio album, named "Beth Nohadra", the Assyrian name for his hometown, Dohuk. The album ultimately established his professional singing career, and until this date Janan has released over 25 albums and recorded close to 200 songs.

During his time in Dohuk, Janan would sing on regular occasions such as picnics and family events. Janan has also appeared and performed live on music television programs in Iraq.

== Style ==
Janan's musical style is influenced by Assyrian village folklore.

== Personal life ==
Janan has married three times and has since been divorced. He has two daughters with his two of his ex-wives. He got engaged in 2018 and he currently resides in Michigan. His brother, Esam Sawa, is also a singer.

== Discography ==
- 1985 - Nohadra
- 1986 - Tamboree
- 1986 - Zamareh
- 1987 - Yema
- 1988 - Sayada
- 1989 - Jwanka D'Hakkari
- 1990 - Lawando
- 1991 - Kirkuk
- 1992 - Ana Ewan Beth Nahrin
- 1993 - Zowaa
- 1994 - Kha B'Nisan
- 1995 - Shara D'Ninwahyeh
- 1996 - Mix of Janan Sawa
- 1997 - Nahrin
- 1998 - Broony
- 2001 - Shtwaher Ya Yema
- 2002 - Bderen L'Nohadra
- 2002 - Lenwa Ana
- 2004 - Qinate Min Atra
- 2005 - Hekle Tlekhe
- 2006 - Zorna Dahola
- 2006 - Kholma Sharira
- 2008 - Ishtar
- 2011 - Zamrin B'Khobakh
- 2012 - Atta
- 2013 - Bayenna
