= Tovlama =

Azerbaijani and Assyrian folk dance

Tovlama (Note: also spelled Towlama, Tolama, or Toulama) is an Azerbaijani and Assyrian folk dance from West Azerbaijan in northwestern Iran. It is specifically attributed to the Karapapakhs of Sulduz and Urmia among the Azerbaijanis and categorized as a yallı in Azerbaijani folklore with its circle dance nature. There are several versions of Assyrian Toulama, the regular Toulama and Two Legged Toulama.

== Etymology ==
Tovlama derives from the Azerbaijani verb tovlamaq, which means to move or to wiggle.

== Choreography ==
While dancing regular Assyrian Toulama, dancers initially hold hands in a "W" position, face the center of the group, slightly turned to the right, with weight on left, and cross their right feet on the left. Then, they leap to right and hop on right and then leap to left and hop on left. Later, the dancers sway their left legs back and forth in each step as they leap to and hop on right for three times each. They leap and hop on left, while swaying their left leg, once again hop on left, while crossing right foot over left, and lastly hop on left.

In Assyrian Two Legged Toulama, dancers hold hands in a "W" position, face the center of the group, slightly turned to the right, with weight on left. They start the dance with a side step with right leg, crossing with left, jumping on both feet, keeping weight on the right. After a pause, dancers start hopping to the right while swaying their left legs to front, back, and front. They leap on left and bring their right foot back, hop on left and kick right foot forward, hop on left and cross right foot over left foot.

== Music ==
In regular Assyrian Toulama, the meter is 2/4; the period is 7; the tempo is 120 to 150 beats per second. In Two Legged Toulama, the meter is 6/8; the period is 5; the tempo is 120 to 130 beats per second.
