= Tamzara =

Folk dance from the Armenian highlands

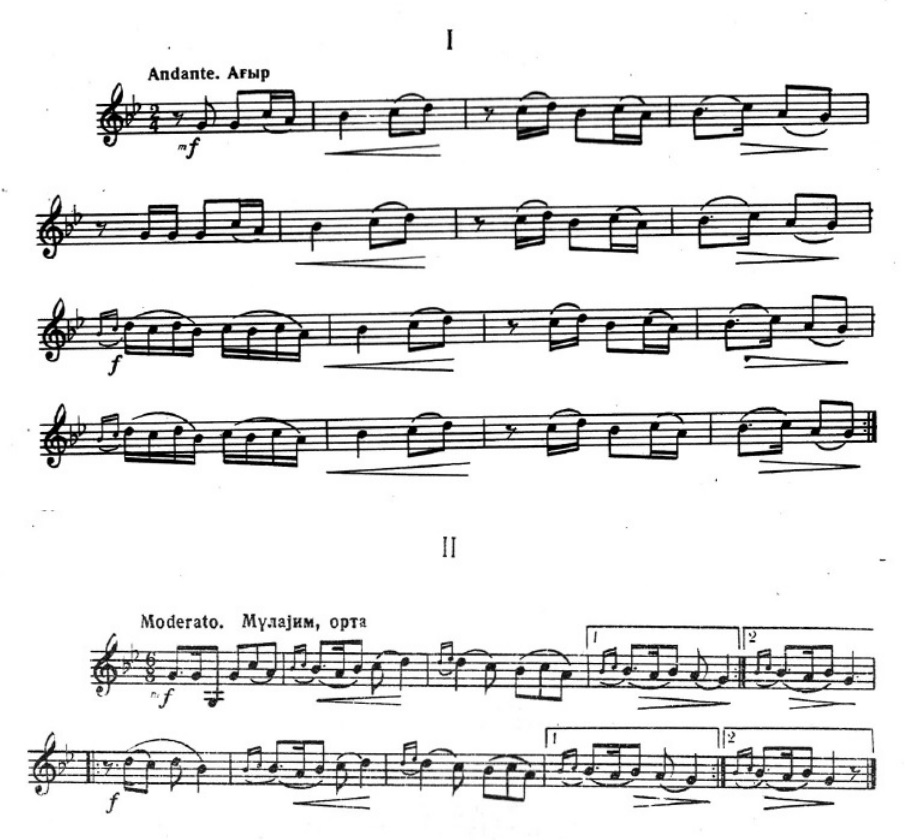
- Genre: Folk dance
- Origin: Armenian Highlands

Yalli (Kochari, Tenzere), traditional group dances of Nakhchivan
- UNESCO Intangible Cultural Heritage
- Country: Azerbaijan
- Reference: 01190
- Region: Europe and North America

Inscription history
- Inscription: 2018 (13th session)
- List: Need of Urgent Safeguarding

Tamzara (Note: Armenian: Թամզարա, romanized: T'amzara; Assyrian Neo-Aramaic: ܬܢܙܪܐ, romanized: Tanzara; Azerbaijani: Tənzərə; Greek: Τάμσαρα, romanized: Támsara; Turkish: Tamzara) is an Armenian folk dance native to the Armenian Highlands. In Armenia the dance originally had a ritual character, it was a wedding song and dance. Now "Tamzara" has lost its former ritual significance, when it was performed during almost all community events and parties. It is today performed by Armenians, Assyrians, Azerbaijanis (in the regions of Sharur, Nakhchivan and parts of Iranian Azerbaijan), Greeks and Turks. In post-Soviet Armenia, tamzara dance is gaining more and more popularity among all strata of the population.

This dance was also especially popular in the formerly Armenian-populated regions of Erzincan, Erzurum, Kigi, Arapgir, Harput, and Malatya. There are many versions of Tamzara, with slightly different music and steps, coming from the various regions and old villages in the Armenian Highlands. According to Folk Dance Federation of California, Inc (July, 2001) Tamzara is performed by Armenians not only in Armenia, also in the countries of Armenian Diaspora.

== History and description ==
Some scholars suggest that the dance may have originated in the ancient village of Tamzara, located in the northeastern part of Sebastia/Sivas, which was once part of Western Armenia. The name is believed to stem from a local story: “The leader of the village offered his guests his hospitality and always called for his daughter-in-law Zara to serve them ‘tan’ (yoghurt mixed with salt and water). Therefore, he called to her by saying: ‘Tan, Zara!’” According to old local legends, this phrase eventually led to the village being referred to as Tanzara.

The meaning of this dance, which is famous in the villages of Charchibogan, Chomakhtur and other villages of Nakhchivan's Sharur region, is "Gizili tanbatan" (half golden) in word-by-word translation. Tamzara is included to the repertoire of the folklore dancing collectives respectively. The women dancing used to dress luxuriously and adorn themselves with golden accessories, including rings, ear-rings, bracelets, chains and others.

In 2018, Azerbaijani-style Tamzara, along with kochari, was inscribed into the UNESCO List of Intangible Cultural Heritage with the Yalli dance in need of urgent safeguarding.

== Style ==
All Tamzaras have the unique 9/8 rhythm, with the two accented beats at the end of each measure. In addition, the melody to most Tamzaras is very similar, though there are exceptions. Like most folk dances of the Armenian Highlands, Tamzara is done as a line dance or circle dance, with a large group of people with interlocked pinkies. However one version of the Tamzara is done by a man with one or two women standing shoulder to shoulder facing the same direction with their arms around each other's waists.

Tamzara is one of the most popular Armenian folk dances to have been preserved in the United States by the Armenian-American community.

== See also ==
- An Dro
- Faroese dance
- Kalamatianos
- Khigga
- Syrtos
