= Shamiram Urshan =

- Born: 14 June 1938; Tehran, Iran
- Origin: Seattle, Washington
- Died: 25 June 2011 (aged 73); San Jose, California
- Genres: Assyrian music
- Occupations: Singer, dancer
- Years active: 1978–1987

Shamiram Urshan (1938 – 25 June 2011), also known as Shamiram Ourshan and occasionally Shamiram Oshana (Syriac: ܫܡܝܪܡ ܐܘܫܥܢܐ), was an Assyrian American singer and entertainer originally from Iran, who gained popularity in the 1980s.

== Biography ==
Shamiram was born in Tehran as the youngest of four children. She started singing, playing instruments and acting in school plays at the age of eight. She performed for the Iranian national TV in high school. After finishing high school, Shamiram taught dance to kindergarten children and was asked to perform at the Indian embassy in Tehran.

She married at the age of 22 in 1960. She moved to the United States in 1970 with her husband, where she settled in Seattle, eventually giving birth to three children. 33 years later, Shamiram moved to Los Angeles to be closer to her grandchildren. She died on 25 June 2011 in San Jose, and was survived by her two sons, both servicemen in the United States Army, and one daughter.

== Music ==
Her musical interests included those in Persian, Turkish, Arabic and Hindi. Her professional career began in 1978, when she released her first album, titled Shamiram after the Assyrian queen Semiramis. The album was very well received internationally which led to singing engagements around the world including Europe, North America and Australia. Her style was influenced by Greek music.

She released three more albums during the 1980s and toured Europe and Australia. A compilation album was later released in 1995.

== Discography ==
Excerpt from "Shooshola"
A music sample of Shamiram Urshan's voice from her 1978 album Shamiram.

- Shamiram (1978)
- Dreams (1982)
- Ashikoota (1984)
- Feelings (1987)
- Best of Shamiram (compilation) (1995)
