= Evin Agassi =

Assyrian singer (1945–2024)

Evin Agassi ܐܝܒ̣ܢ ܐܓܣܝ
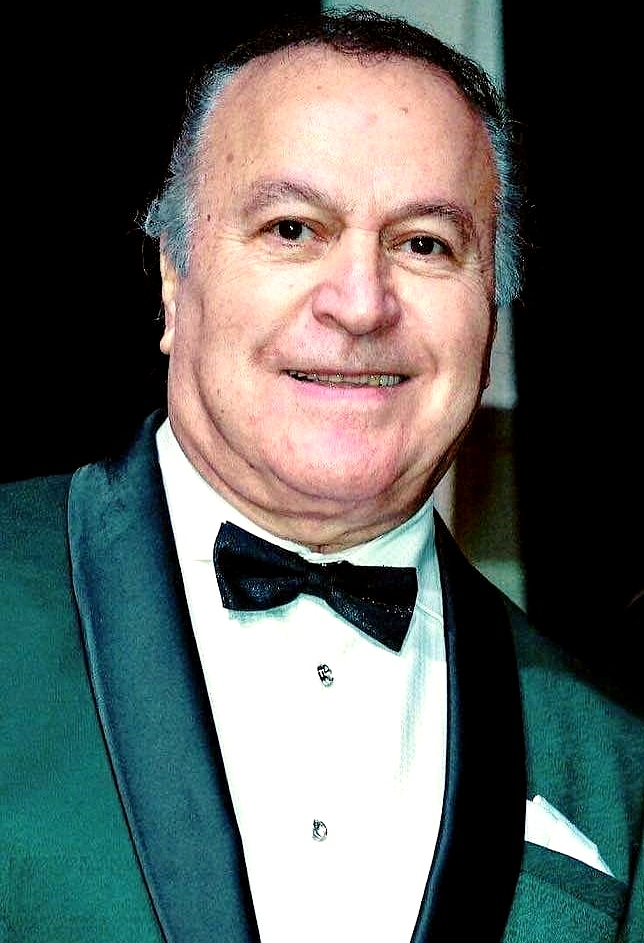
- Agassi in 2018

Background information
- Born: 25 September 1945; Kermanshah, Iran
- Died: 17 September 2024 (aged 78) Modesto, California, U.S.
- Genres: Assyrian music; folk pop; folk dance
- Occupation: Singer
- Years active: 1967–2024

Evin Agassi (Note: His first name is generally pronounced Evan by Iranian Assyrians and Ewan by Iraqi and Syrian Assyrians, with an emphasis on the vowels. Though Agassi's preferred pronunciation was Evin.) (25 September 1945 – 17 September 2024) was an Iranian-American Assyrian singer who had a career that spanned for over 50 years. Agassi produced over 40 albums during his career, with a majority of them being released in the 1980s and 1990s.

Possessing spinto-tenor vocals, his work generally consisted of sophisticated ballads, love songs, nationalistic music and folk dance, with musical inspiration from Persian pop and, more recently, Latin pop genres, where he fused his art with cultural resistance.

One of the better-known Assyrian singers, he generally toured Australia, Europe and West Asia. The majority of his songs were written by his brother, Givergiss Agassi, both in Persian and Assyrian. His full name has also been spelled as Evan Aghassi. (Note: Many Assyrian speakers generally use the voiced velar fricative ('gh' sound) when uttering the first consonant in his surname.)

== Career ==
=== 1960s–early 1970s: Radio work and breakthrough ===
Agassi was born in Kermanshah, Iran to an Iranian Assyrian family. Although he began singing in gigs in the late 1950s, he was not yet an established professional singer. In the 1960s, he became involved in the Iranian national radio since his teen years where he recorded a number of records in Persian. He worked with many Iranian poets and composers and produced several popular songs, which were broadcast on the radio and TV stations, with several reaching the top ten records at the time. Other than singing, he played the classical guitar and piano keyboard.

One notable Persian song from 1974 entitled Shahrzaad was loved by many Iranians and Assyrians all over the world. After his breakthrough from that song, Agassi was invited to the United States for some concerts in California and Chicago in 1976, which became a success. After returning to Iran, he produced songs based upon his pleasant experience in the United States.

=== Late 1970s–1980s: Political controversies and relocation to the US ===
Courageously, Agassi made a few social political songs, forgetting the strong censorship in Iran. These songs, which were about humanity, equality, and freedom, were ultimately collected by the Iranian government and banned. Due to these distressing outcomes and also because of the Islamic Revolution of Iran, Agassi relocated to the United States in the late 1970s for the social and political freedom there. He resided in Modesto, California.

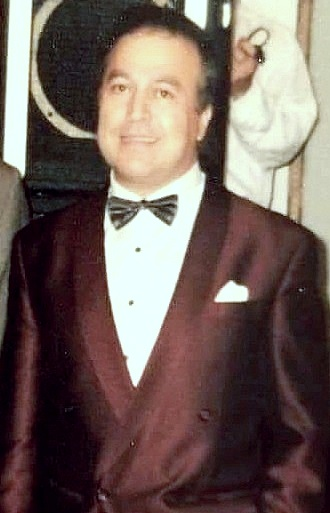
Agassi in 1993

Agassi's patriotic music inspired the Assyrians' nationalism in Iraq, where the Assyrians there established the Assyrian Democratic Movement in 1979. In the 1980s, the Iraqi government also became rather vehement towards his songs, as they emboldened the Assyrians of Iraq, who opted for peace, freedom and human rights. As such, a few of Agassi's songs were banned in the country and his name was registered on a blacklist by Saddam Hussein. Those caught listening to or distributing his music faced punishment.

=== 1990s–early 2000s: Precarious visits to the Middle East ===
In August 1991, Agassi visited Al-Hasakah, Syria for the first time to perform for the Syrian Assyrians there. In April 1993, he had his maiden visit to Northern Iraq, where he performed in a festal and ceremonious concert.

In the early 2000s, before the invasion of Iraq, the Assyrian Democratic Movement invited Agassi to perform at a concert in the no-fly zone of Iraq. His trip was under the supervision of the allied forces, which prompted the Iraqi government to create a power outage in Northern Iraq, and sent assassins for an attempt on his life. The Iraqi government bribed him into participating in a concert in Baghdad, in which he declined.

=== Mid 2000s–2020s: Continued world tours and final years ===
Agassi had since raised hundreds of thousand of dollars for Assyrian churches and the welfare organizations aiding the Assyrian people. In 2010, he again travelled to Syria, and in 2016 he has visited Iraqi Kurdistan, to perform at the concerts and parties there. One of Agassi's last albums, "The Circle Of Life", released in 2012, was one of his most anticipated albums, after a seven-year hiatus.

Up until the 2020s, he had concerts regularly in North America, West Asia, Europe and Australia, and had visited England, Germany, Canada, France, Austria, Netherlands, Russia, Syria, Iran and Northern Iraq. Agassi had produced just over 500 songs by the 2020s. Agassi's last public performance was at an annual Valentine's Day party in Chicago in February 2024, and his last overseas concert was in Sydney in August 2023.

== Illness and death ==
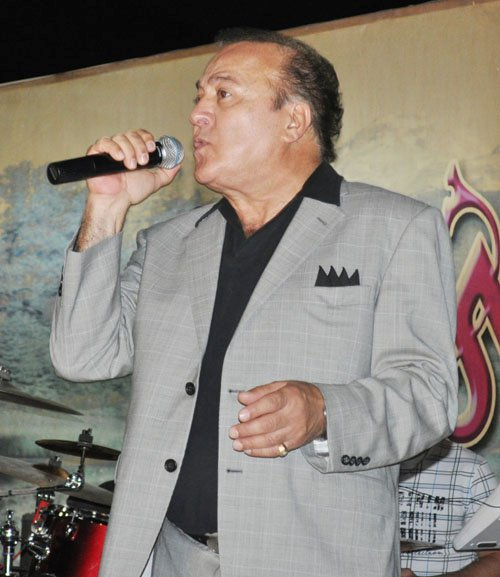
Agassi in 2010, Al-Hasakah Syria

On 12 July 2024, Agassi shared the news that he is diagnosed with glioblastoma in the left frontal lobe of the brain, which was described as an "aggressive inoperable form of brain cancer". He was set to perform in California's Bay Area later in July before cancelling due to his condition. Agassi was reportedly battling the disease for "several years", before his condition deteriorated in July.

Following a comprehensive treatment plan, Agassi's cancer did not respond to radiation and chemotherapy. On 17 September 2024 at 6:49 pm, Agassi succumbed to his illness and died peacefully at the age of 78, with his family by his side. Agassi's funeral and interment were held at Turlock on 3 October.

=== Reaction ===
His death left a significant impact on Assyrian communities worldwide, since his songs were a message for stateless Assyrians to conserve their identity and history. On X, the Assyrian American National Federation stated Agassi's voice "was not just a sound, but a powerful force that united generations, carried our culture across borders, and kept the spirit of our heritage alive in every corner of the globe".

The head of the Department of Ethnic and Religious Components at the Kurdistan Region Presidency, Florin G. Seudin, offered her grief and condolences, where she stated that "we lost one of the greatest artists in the Assyrian nation".

In an SBS podcast by Ninos Emmanuel, his death was described as leaving "an emotional void in the hearts of Assyrians across the world." Further adding, "His music was not merely entertainment; it was a lifeline, a call to resilience and survival for his people. Each of his hundreds of songs carried a message of hope, perseverance, and deep connection to Assyrian identity. Before concluding, "His voice now echoes in the soul of a nation, a beacon that will continue to inspire generations to come."

On 22 September, more than 1,000 people attended the St. Hurmizd Assyrian Church of the East in Greenfield Park, Sydney, for a memorial mass to honor the late singer. Tributes were made by Agassi's dedicated fans, that included local poets, Assyrian singers and Bishop Mar Meelis Zaia.

== Discography ==
Agassi produced over 40 albums in his 50-year career. Here are his albums:

- Records 1 (1967) (Note: These 'record' titles are not albums, but A-side and B-side phonographs that feature two songs.)
  - Records 2 (1968)
  - Record 3 (1969)
  - Record 4 (1970)
  - Record 5 (1970)
- Bakheelota (Enviousness) (1975)
- Umta Burbista (Dispersed Nation) (1975)
- Shamiram (1980)
- Haft Sin (Persian album) (1981)
- Dargooshta D Mardoota (Cradle of Civilization) (1982)
- Winter (1982)
- Alola (Alleyway) (1982)
- Sayaada (Fisherman) (1983)
- Cultivators (Khasade) (1983)
- 9 Nostalgic Hits 1959 (1984) (Note: Although the album was compiled in 1984, the songs were recorded between the 1960s and 1970s.)
- 7 Btabbakh (Seventh Storey) (1984)
- Khazadee (Cultivators) (1984)
- Habbania (1984)
- Red Zero (1985)
- Tomorrow's Country (1985)
- Strength (Khela) (1986)
- Mometa D-Ata (Flag's Promise) (1987)
- Camp (1989)
- Azaad (Free) (1989)
- Orzeh (Men) (1990)
- Gareh (Rooftops) (1992)
- Sama Khwara (Drugs) (Note: 'Sama Khwara' literally translates to 'white poison', which is a term used for illicit drugs in Assyrian (specifically cocaine and heroin).) (1992)
- Sapar D Garbia (Flight To The Western World) (1993)
- United Nations (1994)
- Yesterday (1994)
- Son of our Times (Bronet Zona) (1995)
- Guardian (1995)
- New Generation (1996)
- Paradise (1997)
- Fisherman (1998)
- Broken Chain (1998)
- Happiness (1998)
- Baghdad (2000)
- Letter to God (2000)
- Memories (2005)
- Happiness II (2006)
- Circle of Life (2012)
- 45 Years of Singing (2017)
- Madinkha (Eastern World) (2019)
- Ghasreh (Castles) (2023)
