= Habbaniyah =

Al-Habbaniyah ٱلْحَبَّانِيَّة Habbaniyah
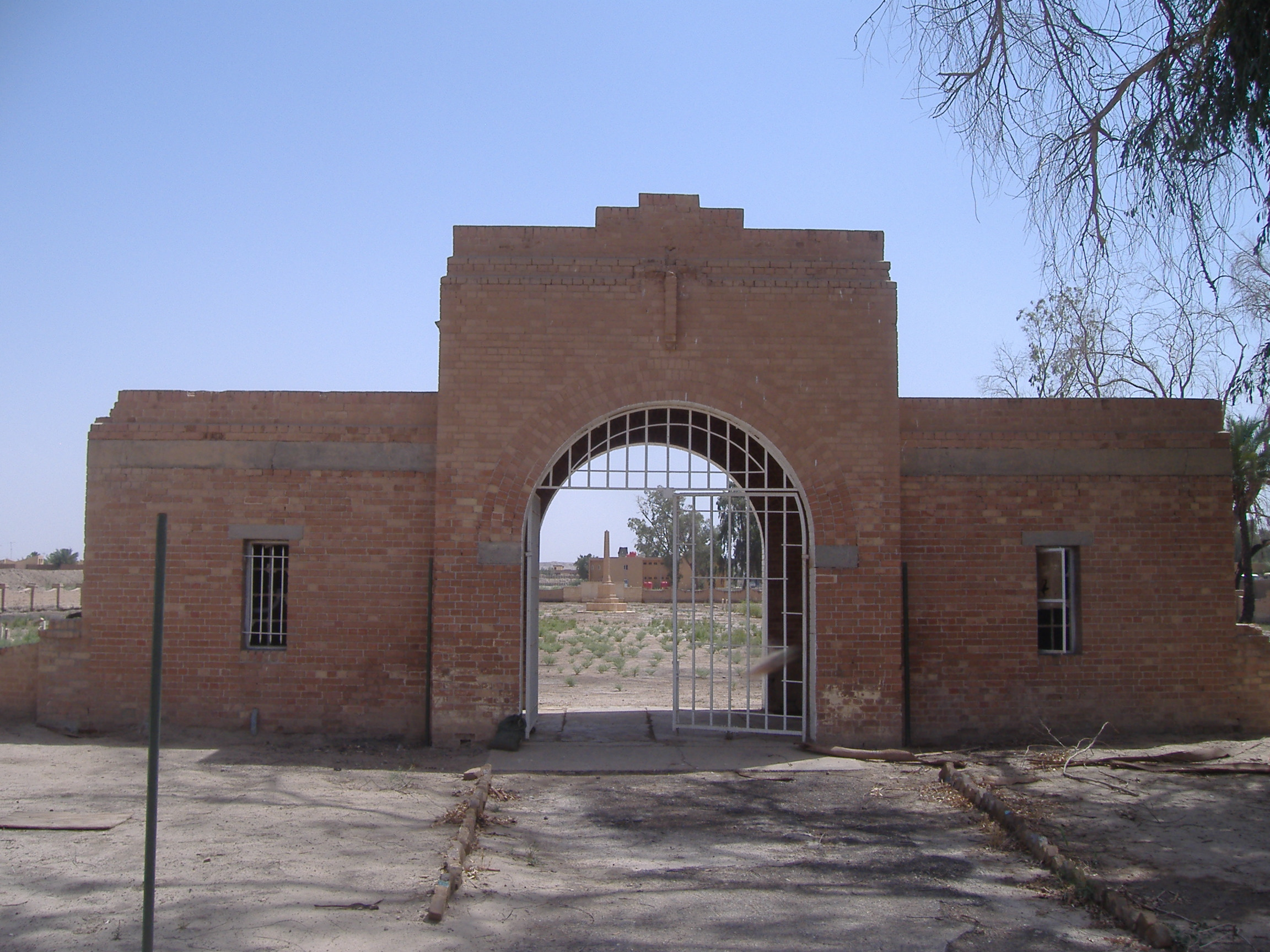

- Location within Iraq
- Coordinates: 33°22′55″N 43°34′38″E
- Country: Iraq
- Province: Al-Anbar

Population (2018)
  - Total: 32,300
- Time zone: UTC+3 (GMT+3)
- Postal code: 31008

Al Habbaniyah or Habbaniya (Arabic: ٱلْحَبَّانِيَّة, al-Ḥabbānīyah) is a city 85 km (53 mi) west of Baghdad in Al-Anbar Province, in central Iraq. A military airfield, RAF Habbaniya, was the site of a battle in 1941, during World War II. Lake Habbaniyah is also nearby.

== History ==
On 25 May 1941, during the Anglo-Iraqi War, the Second Battalion of the Fourth Gurkha Rifles (2/4 GR), forming part of the 10 Indian Infantry Division, was airlifted to reinforce and secure Habbaniyah, which was a Royal Air Force airfield under threat from Iraqi ground troops and the German Luftwaffe, located in Mosul, and Baghdad.

It has 74,217 citizens.

== Climate ==
Climate data for Habbaniyah
Month	Jan	Feb	Mar	Apr	May	Jun	Jul	Aug	Sep	Oct	Nov	Dec	Year
Mean daily maximum °C (°F)	16 (60)	18 (65)	23 (73)	30 (86)	37 (98)	41 (106)	44 (111)	44 (111)	41 (105)	33 (92)	24 (76)	17 (63)	31 (87)
Mean daily minimum °C (°F)	4 (39)	6 (42)	9 (48)	14 (58)	20 (68)	23 (73)	26 (78)	25 (77)	21 (70)	16 (60)	11 (51)	6 (42)	15 (59)
Average precipitation mm (inches)	20 (0.8)	20 (0.8)	28 (1.1)	10 (0.4)	2.5 (0.1)	0 (0)	0 (0)	0 (0)	0 (0)	2.5 (0.1)	20 (0.8)	20 (0.8)	130 (5)
Source: Weatherbase
