= Circle dance =

Style of dance done in a circle with rhythm instruments and singing

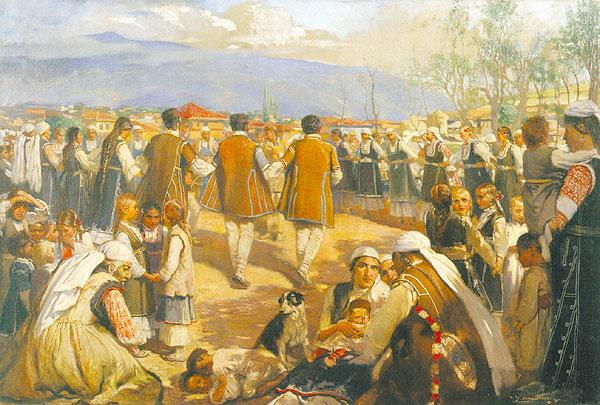
A shop horo of Bulgaria

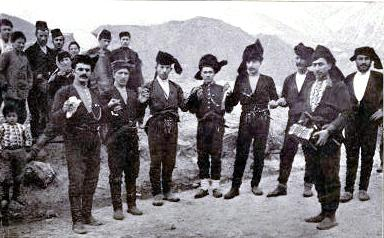
Laz dancers in Armenia, circa 1911

Circle dance, or chain dance, is a style of social dance done in a circle, semicircle or a curved line to musical accompaniment, such as rhythm instruments and singing, and is a type of dance where anyone can join in without the need of partners. Unlike line dancing, circle dancers are in physical contact with each other; the connection is made by hand-to-hand, finger-to-finger or hands-on-shoulders, where they follow the leader around the dance floor. Ranging from gentle to energetic, the dance can be an uplifting group experience or part of a meditation.

Circle dancing, probably the oldest known dance formation, is an ancient tradition common to many cultures for marking special occasions, rituals, strengthening community and encouraging togetherness. Circle dances are choreographed to many different styles of music and rhythms. Modern circle dance mixes traditional folk dances, mainly from European or Near Eastern sources, with recently choreographed ones to a variety of music both ancient and modern. There is a growing repertoire of new circle dances to classical music and contemporary songs.

== Distribution ==
Modern circle dancing is found in many cultures, including Arabic (Levantian and Iraqi), Israeli (see Jewish dance and Israeli folk dancing), Assyrian, Kurdish, Turkish, Armenian, Azerbaijani, Maltese, Ukraine and Balkan. It also found in South Asia such as Nati of Himachal Pradesh, Harul of Uttarakhand, Wanvun of Kashmir, Jhumair of Jharkhand, Fugdi of Goa and Deuda and Dhan Nach of Nepal. Despite its immense reputation in the Middle East and southeast Europe, circle dancing also has a historical prominence in Brittany, Asturias, Catalonia, and Ireland to the west of Europe, and also in South America (Peruvian), Tibet, and with Native Americans (see ghost dance). In its more meditative form, it is also used in worship in various religious traditions including the Church of England and the Islamic Haḍra Dhikr (or Zikr) dances.

== History ==
=== Western hemisphere ===
Ghost Dance is an example of a native American circle dance.

=== South Asia ===
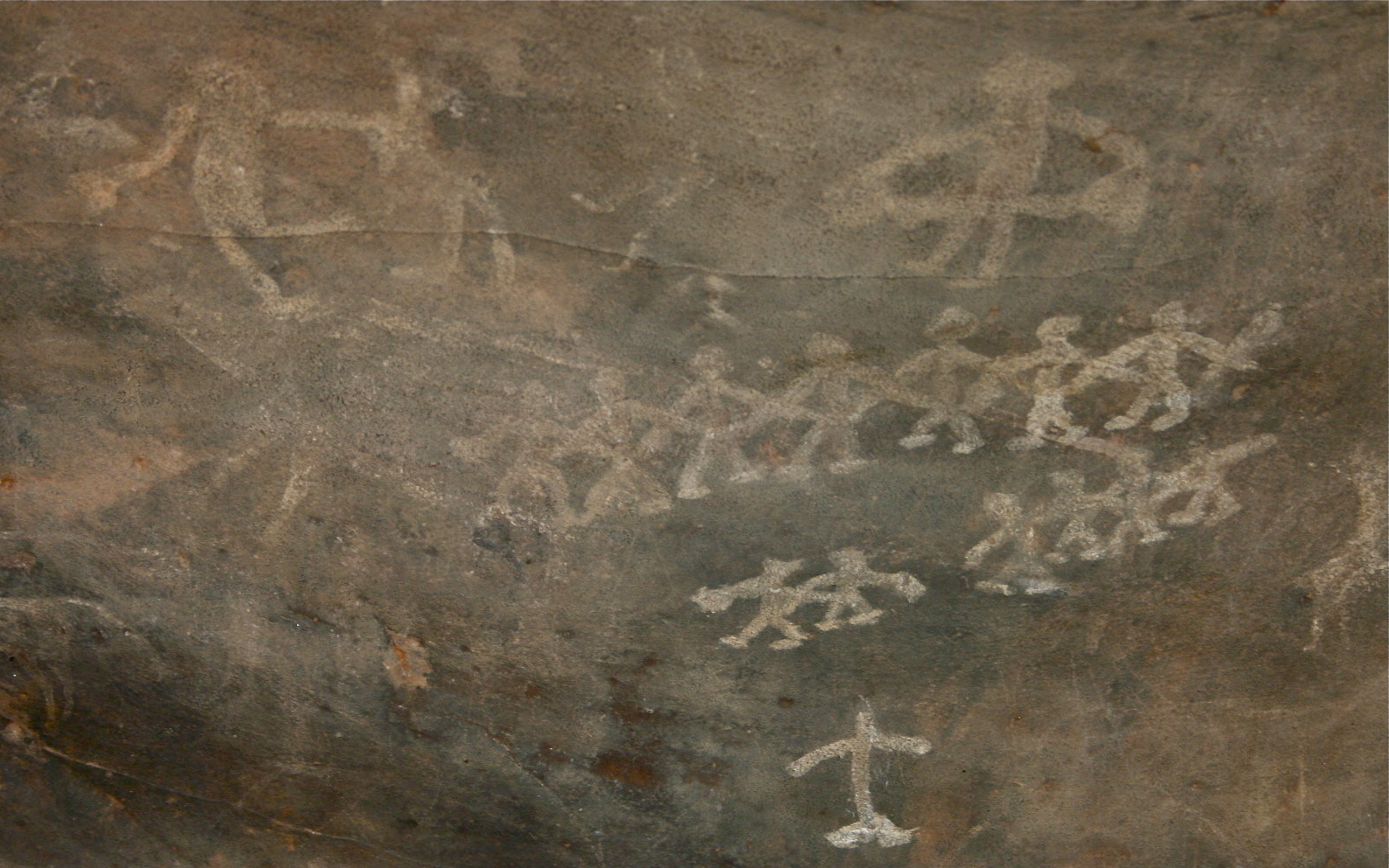
Painting of dancers and musician in Bhimbetka rock shelters, India

Cave painting found in south Asia since Paleolithic period. Cave paintings of Bhimbetka rock shelters of Madhya Pradesh in India shows the painting of dancers and musician which is from Mesolithic period. It shows people dancing by holding hand together.

=== Balkans ===
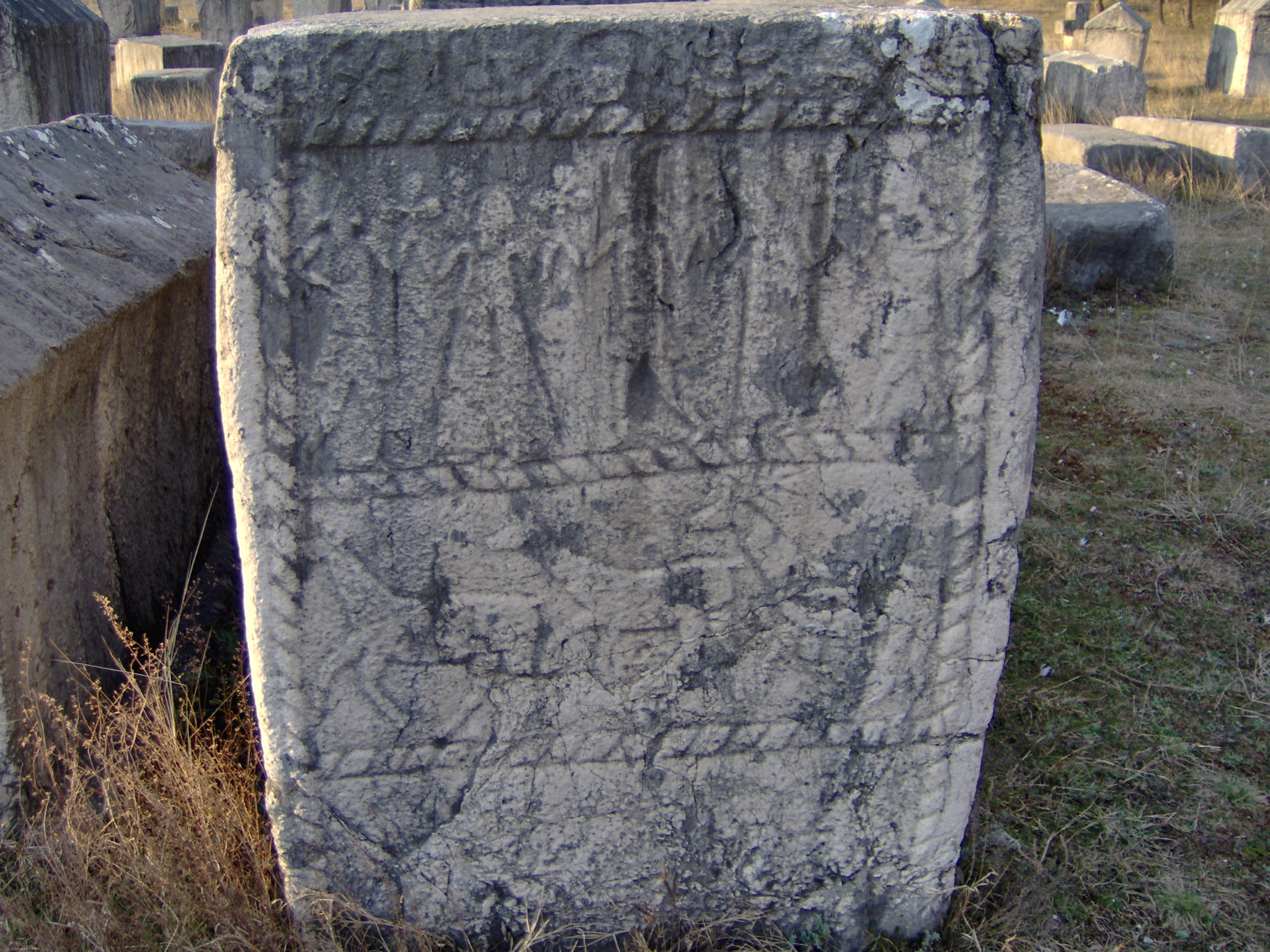
Stecak from Radimlja, Hercegovina showing linked figures

Medieval tombstones called "Stećci" (singular "Stećak") in Bosnia and Hercegovina, dating from the end of the 12th century to the 16th century, bear inscriptions and figures which look like dancers in a chain. Men and women are portrayed dancing together holding hands at shoulder level but occasionally the groups consist of only one sex.

In Macedonia, near the town of Zletovo, the murals on the monastery of Lesnovo (Lesnovo Manastir), which date from the 14th century, show a group of young men linking arms in a round dance. A chronicle from 1344 urges the people of the city of Zadar to sing and dance circle dances for a festival. However, a reference comes from Bulgaria, in a manuscript of a 14th-century sermon, which called chain dances "devilish and damned."

=== Central Europe ===
The circle dance of Germany is called "Reigen"; it dates from the 10th century, and may have originated from devotional dances at early Christian festivals. Dancing around the church or a fire was frequently denounced by church authorities which only underscores how popular it was. One of the frescos (dating from the 14th century) in Tyrol, at Runkelstein Castle, depicts Elisabeth of Poland, Queen of Hungary leading a chain dance. Circle dances were also found in Czech Republic, dating to the 15th century. Dancing was primarily done around trees on the village green. In Poland as well the earliest village dances were in circles or lines accompanied by the singing or clapping of the participants.

=== Mediterranean ===
In the 14th century, Giovanni Boccaccio describes men and women circle dancing to their own singing or accompanied by musicians. One of the frescos in Siena by Ambrogio Lorenzetti painted in 1338–1340 show a group of women doing a "bridge" figure while accompanied by another woman playing the tambourine.

There are accounts of two western European travelers to Constantinople, the capital of the Ottoman Empire. In 1577, Salomon Schweigger describes the events at a Greek wedding:

then they joined arms one upon the other, made a circle, went round the circle, with their feet stepping hard and stamping; one sang first, with the others all following after.

Another traveler, the German pharmacist Reinhold Lubenau, was in Constantinople in November 1588 and reports on a Greek wedding in these terms:

a company of Greeks, often of ten or more persons, stepped forth to the open place, took each other by the hand, made a round circle, and now stepped backward, now forward, sometimes went around, singing in Greek the while, sometimes stamped strongly on the ground with their feet.

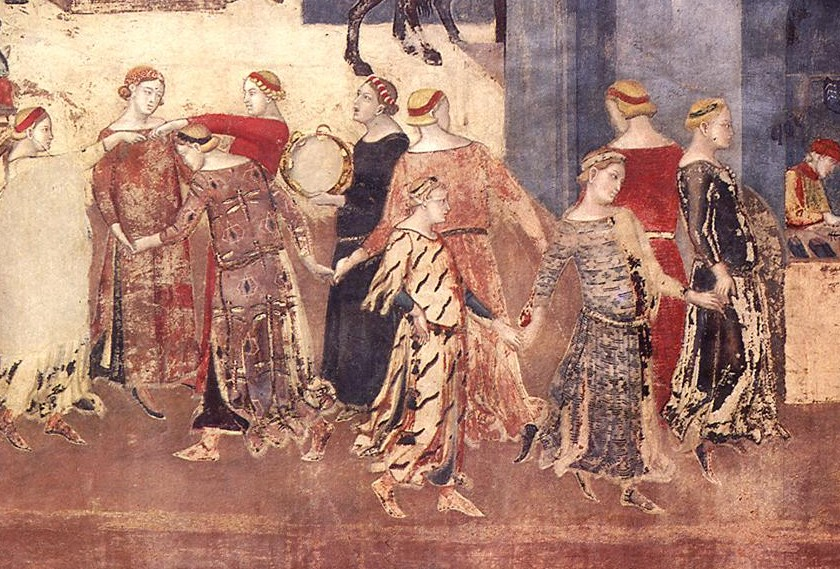
The Italian circle dance made up of females, which features the "bridge"

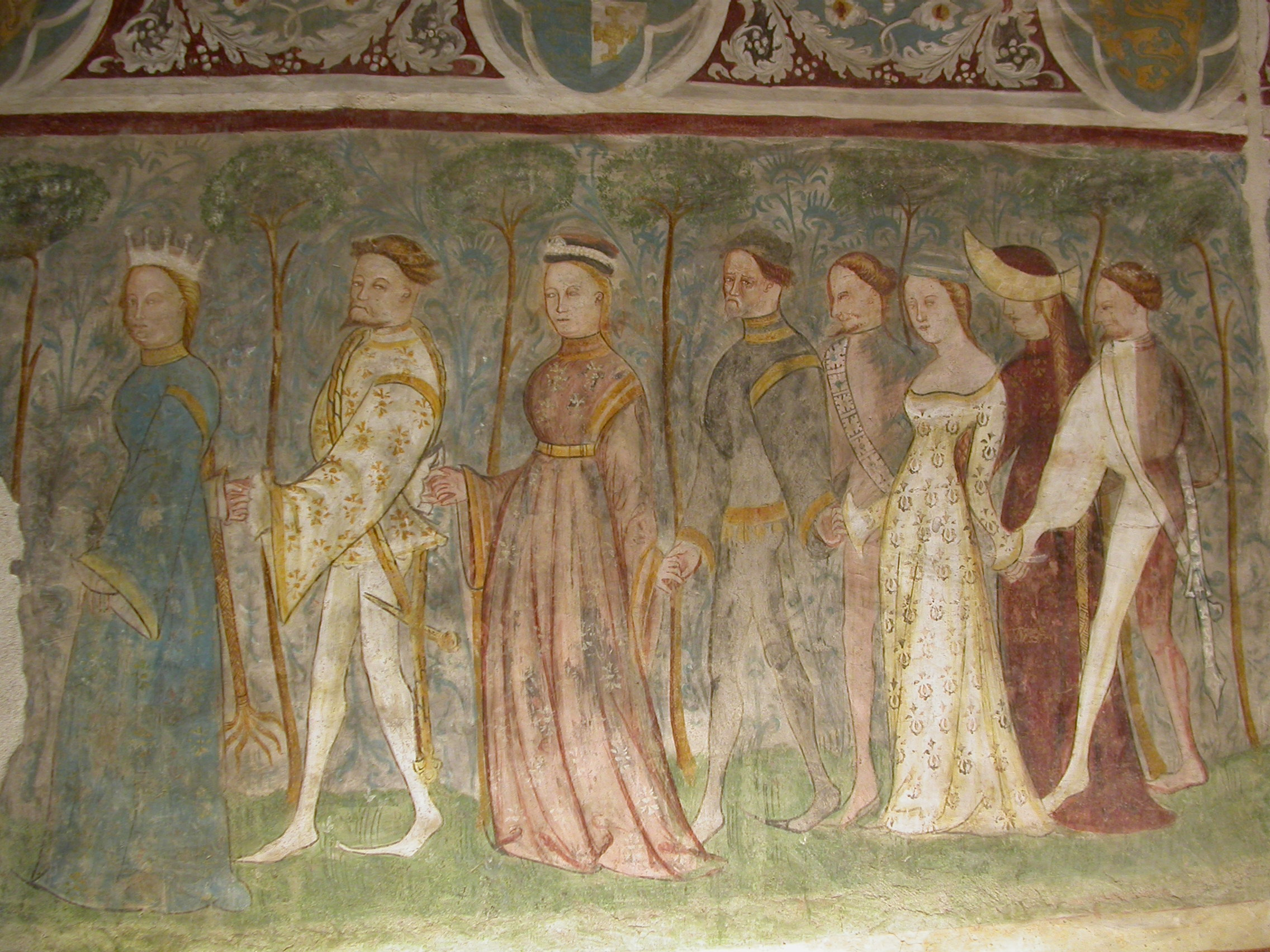
Medieval circle dancing, South Tyrol, Italy

=== Scandinavia ===
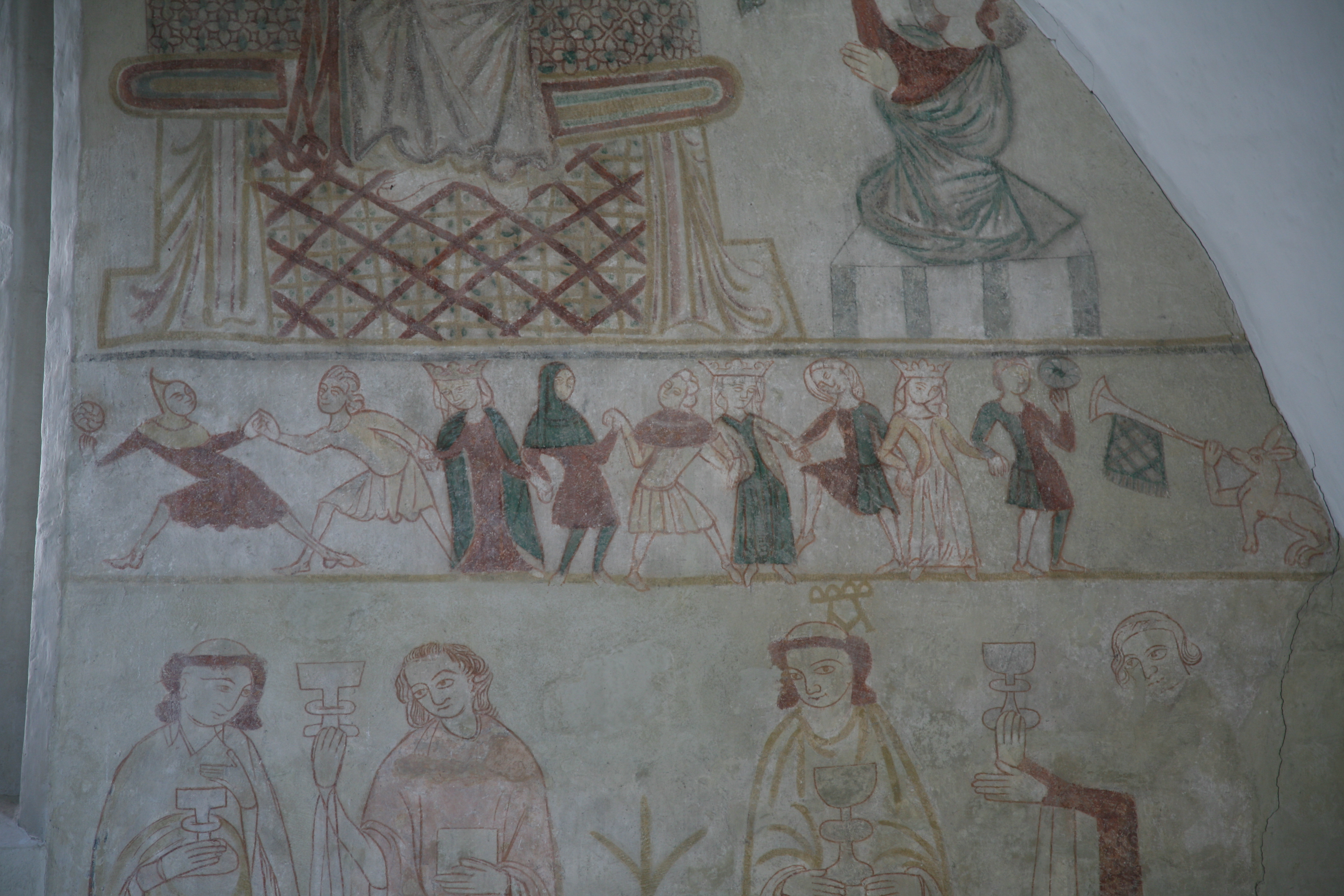
Fresco at Ørslev church, Denmark showcasing a medieval form of chain dancing

In Denmark, old ballads mention a closed circle dance which can open into a chain dance. A fresco in Ørslev church in Zealand from about 1400 shows nine people, men and women, dancing in a line. The leader and some others in the chain carry bouquets of flowers. In the case of women's dances, there may have been a man who acted as the leader. In Sweden, medieval songs often mentioned dancing. A long chain was formed, with the leader singing the verses and setting the time while the other dancers joined in the chorus.

== Modern dances ==
=== Eastern Europe ===
==== Hora ====
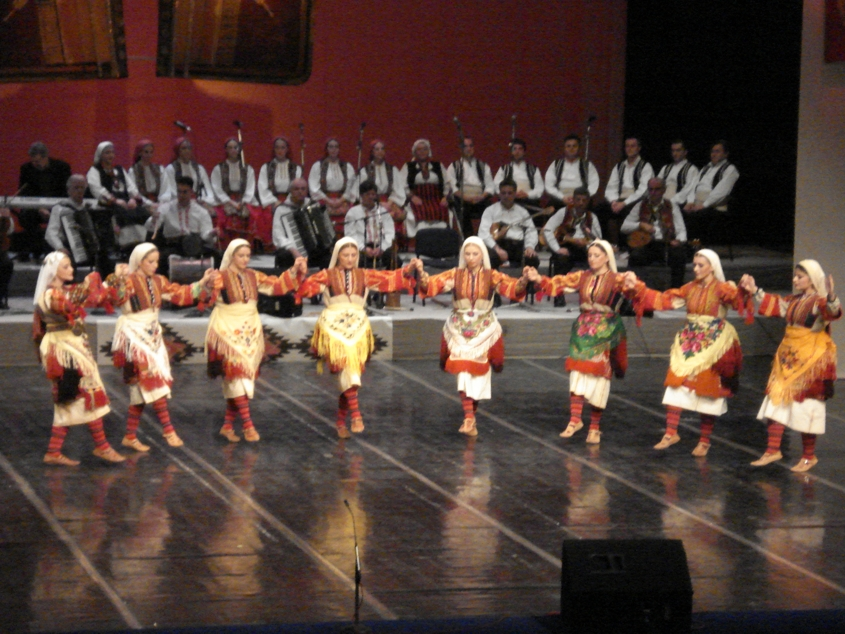
A traditional hora dance in North Macedonia

The Hora dance originates in the Balkans but is also found in other countries (including Romania and Moldova). The dancers hold each other's hands and the circle spins, usually counterclockwise, as each participant follows a sequence of three steps forward and one step back. The Hora is popular during wedding celebrations and festivals, and is an essential part of social entertainment in rural areas. In Bulgaria, it is not necessary to be in a circle; a curving line of people is also acceptable.

==== Kolo ====
The Kolo is a collective folk dance common in various South Slavic regions, such as Serbia and Bosnia, named after the circle formed by the dancers. It is performed amongst groups of people (usually several dozen, at the very least three) holding each other's having their hands around each other's waists (ideally in a circle, hence the name). There is almost no movement above the waist.

=== Southern Europe ===
==== Albanian circle dances ====
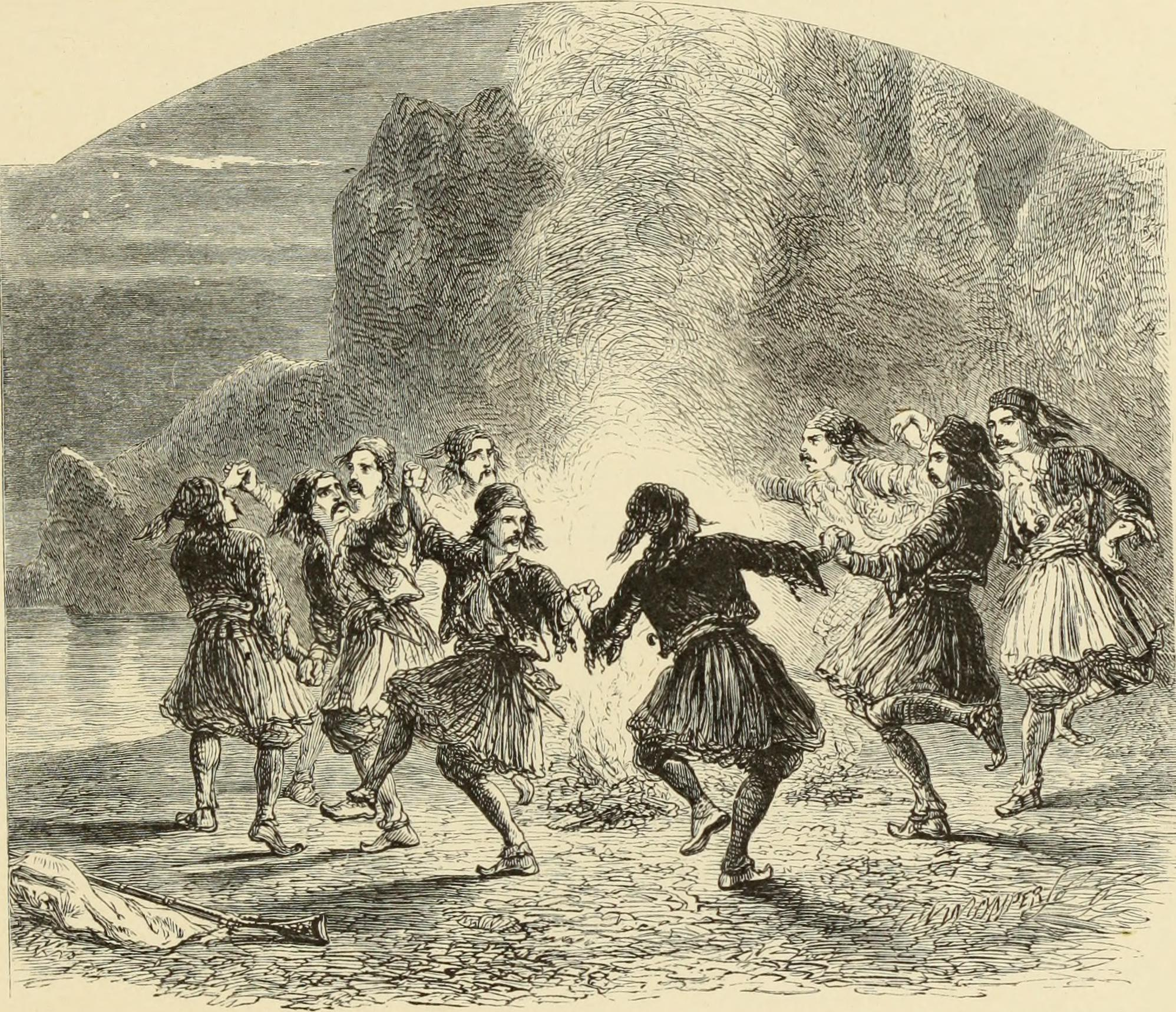
Albanian warrior dance in circle around fire (zjarri), drawing from the book Childe Harold's Pilgrimage written by Lord Byron in the early 19th century.

Early descriptions of the Albanian war dance in circle around fire was provided in the early 19th century by western travellers who visited southern Albania. The dance is practiced for several hours with very short intervals, acquiring new vigour from the words of the accompanying song that starts with a battle cry invoking war drums, and which is of a piece with the movement and usually changed only once or twice during the whole performance.

The ritual purifying fire (Zjarri) is traditionally used by Albanians, in particular singing and dancing around it, to gain protection and energizing from its supernatural power.

A ritual practiced during Dita e Verës, an Albanian pagan feast that celebrates the spring equinox – the beginning of the spring-summer period with the strengthening of the Sun (Dielli) and the renewal of Nature – has been described as follows:

"In the closed circle dance, having the fire in the center, the first ritual element is found, interlaced with choreographic motives, which classify this dance in the ritual category. The cult of fire, an important basic and ancient element, and the closed circle of the performers, a very important fact for the ritualistic choreography, create the main axis of the dance."

==== Kalamatianos ====
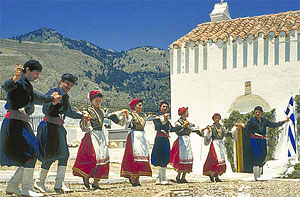
Syrtos dance

The Kalamatianos is a popular Greek folkdance throughout Greece and Cyprus, and is often performed at many social gatherings worldwide. As is the case with most Greek folk dances, it is danced in a circle with a counterclockwise rotation, the dancers holding hands. The lead dancer usually holds the second dancer by a handkerchief, thus allowing more elaborate steps and acrobatics. The steps of the Kalamatianós are the same as those of the Syrtos, but the latter is slower and more stately, its beat being a steady 4/4.

==== Sardana ====
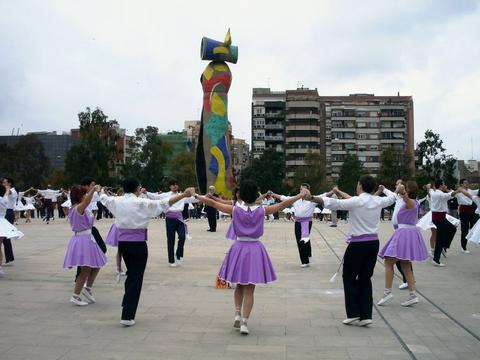
Group dancing sardana in Barcelona

Sardana is a type of circle dance typical of Catalonia. It would usually have an experienced dancer leading the circle. The dancers hold hands throughout the dance: arms down during the curts and raised to shoulder height during the llargs. The dance was originally from the Empordà region, but started gaining popularity throughout Catalonia during the 20th century. There are two main types, the original Sardana curta (short Sardana) style and the more modern Sardana llarga (long Sardana).

==== Syrtos ====
Syrtos and Kalamatianos are Greek dances done with the dancers in a curving line holding hands, facing right. The dancer at the right end of the line is the leader. The leader can also be a solo performer, improvising showy twisting skillful moves as the rest of the line does the basic step. In some parts of Syrtos, pairs of dancers hold a handkerchief from its two sides.

=== Western Europe ===
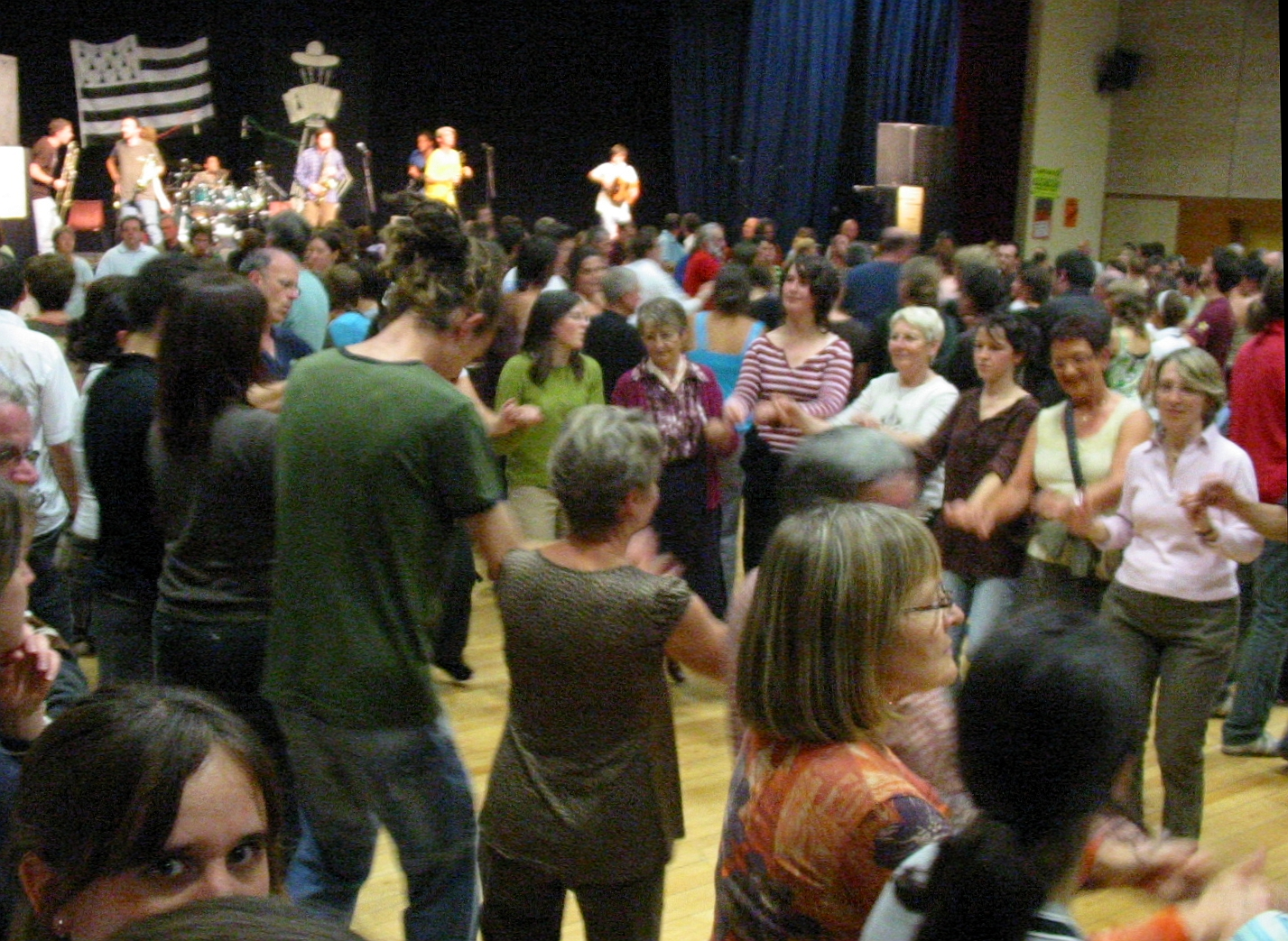
Breton people dancing an dro, swinging their arms with little fingers linked

==== An Dro ====
An Dro, meaning "the turn", is a Breton circle dance. The dancers link the little fingers in a long line, swinging their arms, whilst moving to their left. The arm movements consist first of two circular motions going up and back followed by one in the opposite direction. The leader (person at the left-hand end of the line) will lead the line into a spiral or double it back on itself to form patterns on the dance floor, and allow the dancers to see each other.

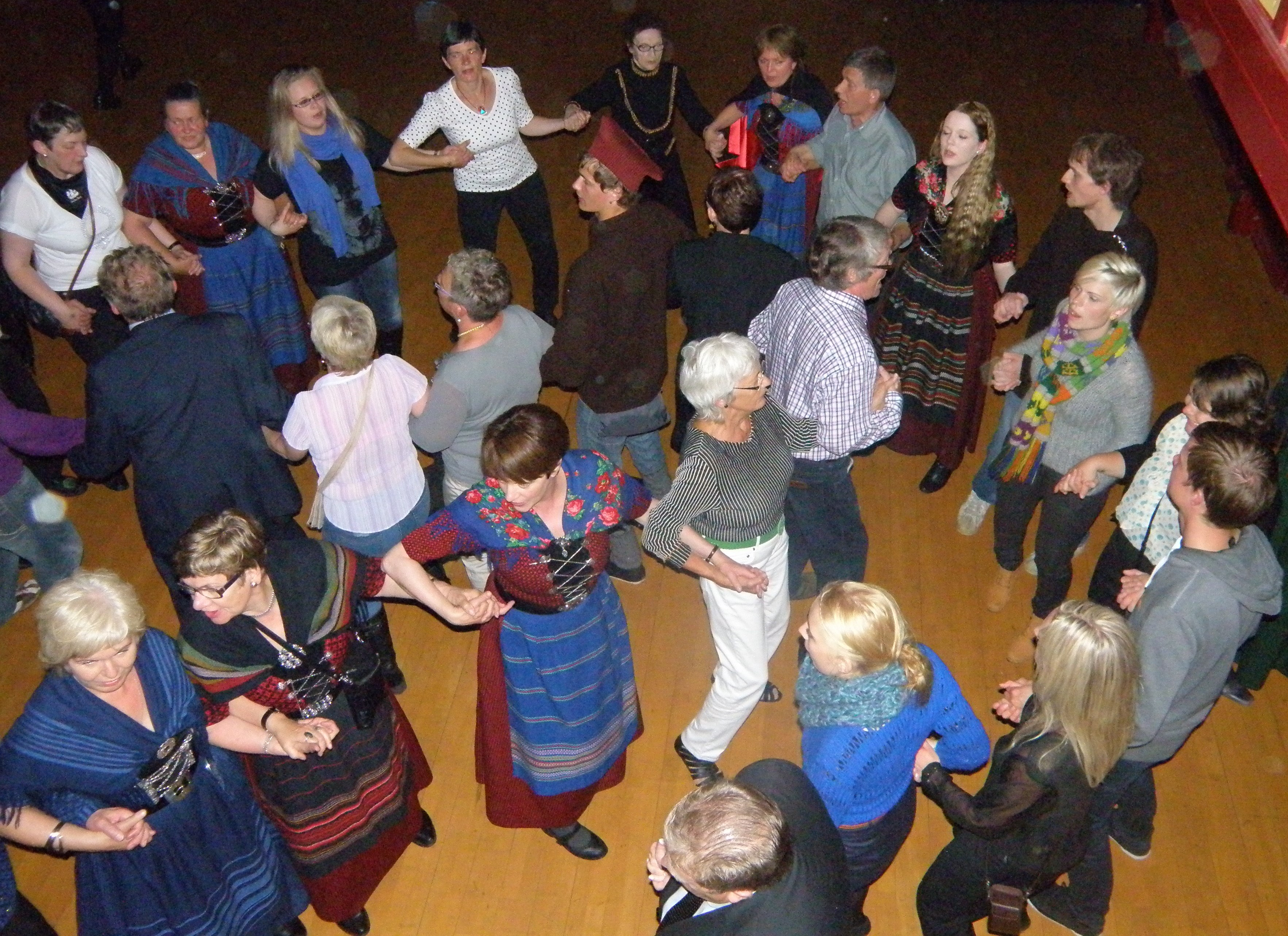
Faroese chain dance in Tórshavn

==== Faroese chain dance ====
The Faroese chain dance is the national circle dance of the Faroe Islands. Derived from a medieval ring dance, and surviving only in the Faroes, it is danced traditionally in a circle, but when a lot of people take part in the dance they usually let it swing around in various wobbles within the circle. The dance in itself only consists in holding each other's hands, while the dancers form a circle, dancing two steps to the left and one to the right without crossing the legs. When more and more dancers join the dance vine, the circle starts to bend and forms a new one within itself.

==== Sacred Circle Dance ====
The Sacred Circle Dance was brought to the Findhorn Foundation community in Scotland by Bernhard Wosien; he presented traditional circle dances that he had gathered from across Eastern Europe. Colin Harrison and David Roberts and Janet Rowan Scott took the dances to other parts of the United Kingdom where they started regular groups in south east England, then across Europe, the US and elsewhere. The network extends also to Australia, New Zealand, South Africa, South America, and India. A small centrepiece of flowers or other objects is often placed at the centre of the circle to help focus the dancers and maintain the circular shape. Much debate goes on within the sacred circle dance network about what is meant by 'sacred' in the dance.

=== Middle East ===
==== Dabke ====
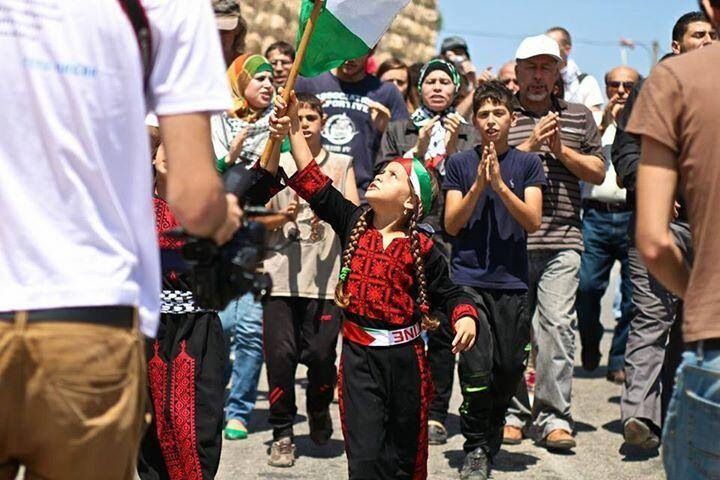
girls dancing traditional Dabke

Dabke is popular in Lebanon, Syria, Palestine, Jordan and Turkey. The most famous type of the dance is the Al-Shamaliyya (الشمالية). It consists of a lawweeh (لويح) at the head of a group of men holding hands and formed in a semicircle. The lawweeh is expected to be particularly skilled in accuracy, ability to improvise, and quickness (generally light on his feet). The dancers develop a synchronized movement and step, and when the singers finish their song the lawweeh breaks from the semicircle to dance on their own. The lawweeh is the most popular and familiar form of dabke danced for happy family celebrations.

==== Govend ====
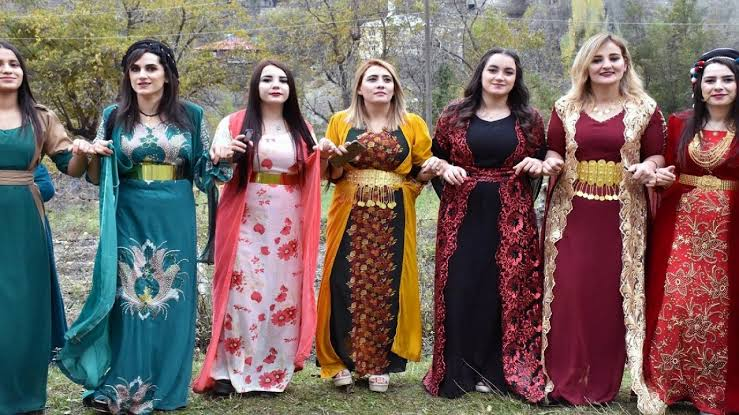
Kurdish govend dance

Govend is one of the most famous traditional Kurdish dances. It is distinguished from other Middle Eastern dances by being for both men and women.

==== Khigga ====
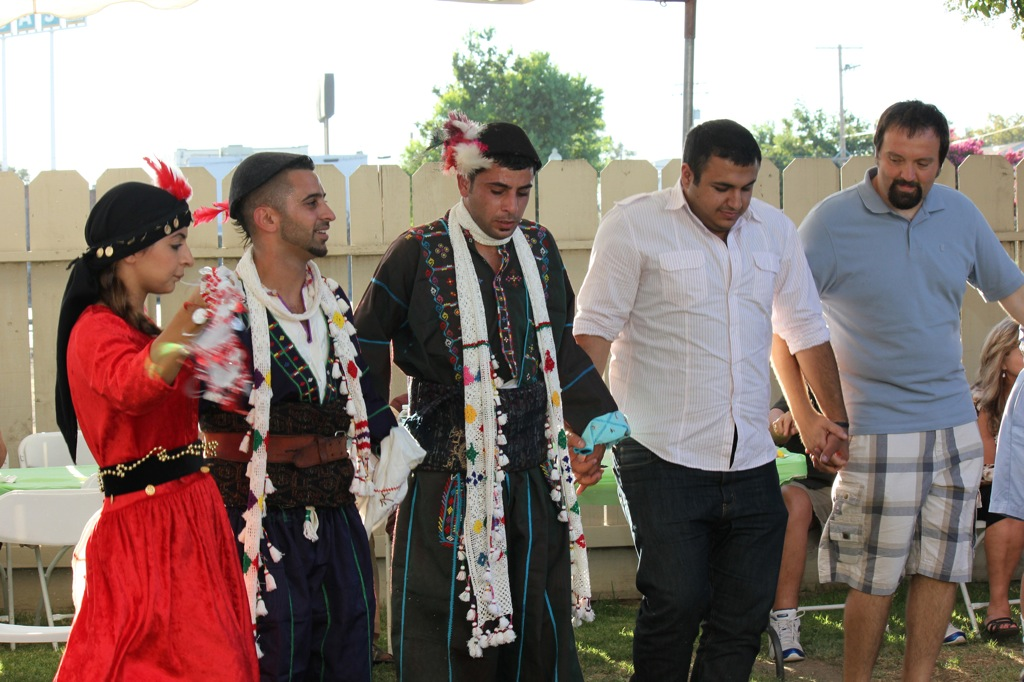
Assyrians dancing khigga at a festival

Khigga is the one of main styles of Assyrian folk dance in which multiple dancers hold each other's hands and form a line or a circle. It is usually performed at weddings and joyous occasions. Khigga is the first beat that is played in welcoming the bride and groom to the reception hall. There are multiple foot patterns that dancers perform. The head of the khigga line usually dances with a handkerchief with beads and bells added to the sides so it jingles when shaken. A decorated cane is also used at many Assyrian weddings. Moreover, the term khigga is used to denote all the Assyrian circle dances.

==== Kochari ====
Kochari is an Armenian folk dance, danced today by Armenians, Assyrians, Azerbaijanis, Kurds, Pontic Greeks and Turks. Dancers form a closed circle, putting their hands on each other's shoulders. More modern forms of Kochari have added a "tremolo step," which involves shaking the whole body. In Azerbaijan, the dance consists of slow and rapid parts, and is of three variants. There is a consistent, strong double bounce. Pontic Greeks dance hand-to-shoulder and travel to the right.

==== Tamzara ====
Tamzara is an Armenian, Assyrian, and Greek folk dance native to Anatolia. There are many versions of Tamzara, with slightly different music and steps, coming from the various regions and old villages in Anatolia. Firstly they take three steps forwards, tap their left feet on the ground, and step forward to stand on the left foot; then they take three small steps back and repeat the actions a little faster. Like most Anatolian folk dances, Tamzara is done with a large group of people with interlocked little fingers.

=== South Asia ===
==== India ====
Circle dance is prevalent in Himalaya region and Central India. Some circle dance of South Asia are Nati of Himachal Pradesh, Harul of Uttarakhand, Wanvun of Kashmir, Jhumair and Domkach of Jharkhand and Fugdi dance of Goa.

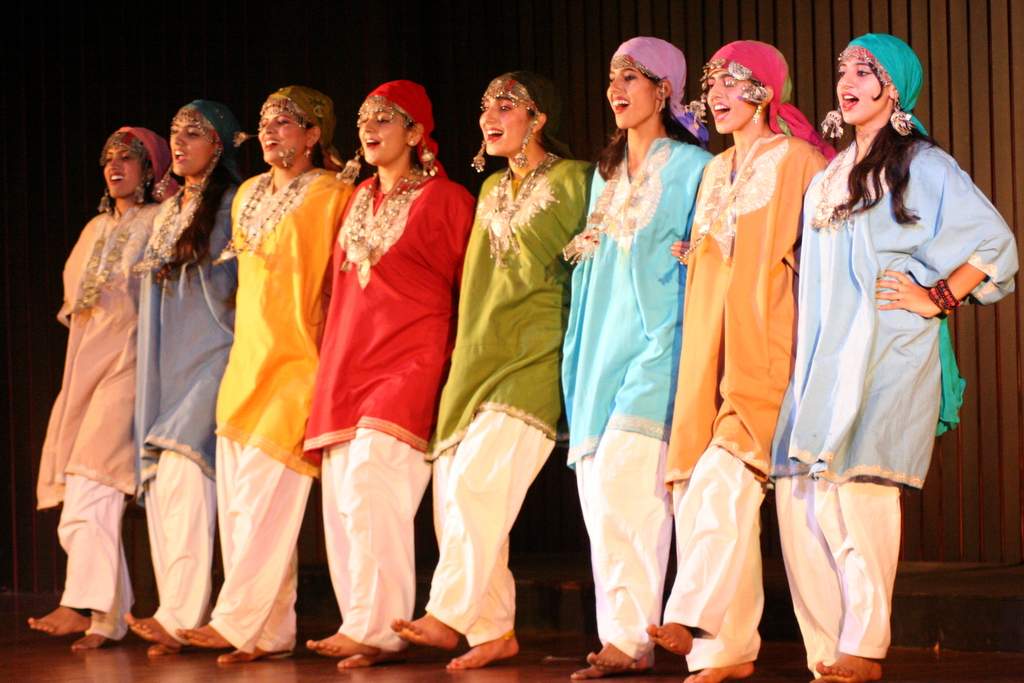
Kashmiri girls performing Rouf Dance in Delhi

==== Pakistan ====
Folk dance of Kalash people of Chitral District of Pakistan is a circle dance.

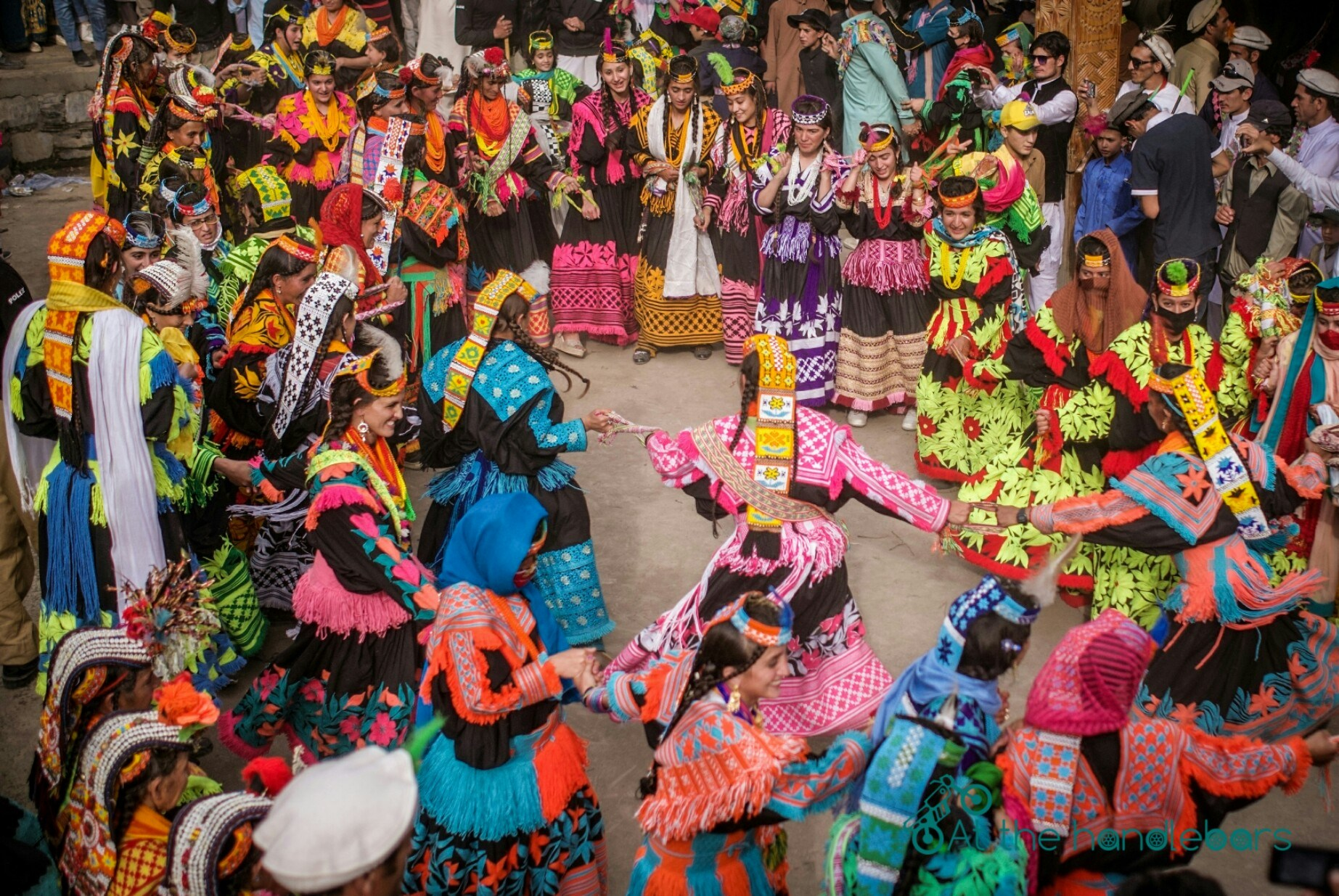
Kalash people in festival

==== Nepal ====
Dhan Nach of Limbu people, Syabru (dance) of Sherpa and Hyolmo people, Sakela of Rai people, Deuda of Khas people are some of the popular circle dances of Nepal.

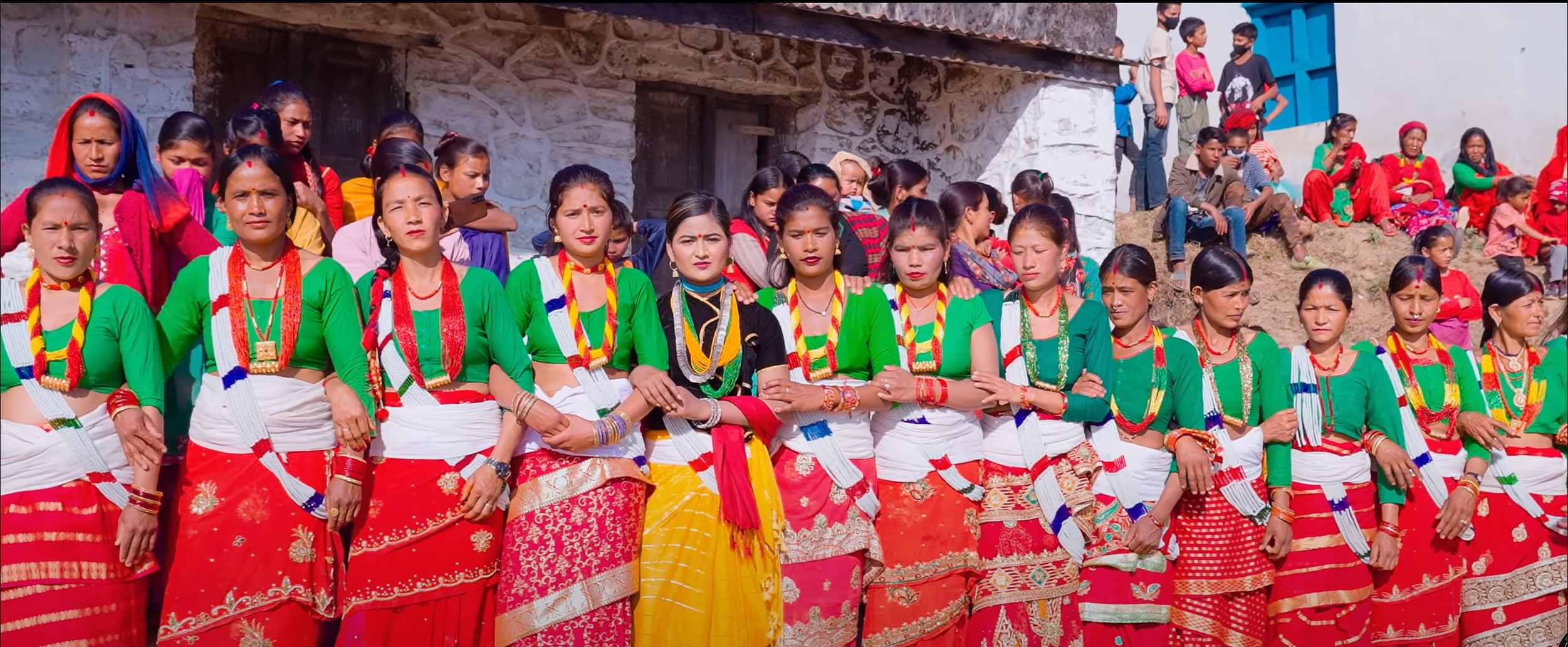
Women performing Deuda in Nepal.

=== Islam (Sufism) ===
Ritual whirling is practiced by Islamic Sufi orders throughout the Islamic world, but is most associated with the Mevlevi Order. Whirling dervishes practice a form of dhikr known as sama, which involves rhythmic group dhikr sometimes with the accompaniment of drums and other instruments; and whirling to that rhythm as a form of religious meditation. The harmony between whirlers and the reciters is meant to help achieve fana - a state escape from the ego, through which one may experience the Divine Unity beyond the Self. The circular whirling itself imitates the cosmic orbit of the planets around the Sun, as well as the circumambulation of pilgrims around the Kaaba during the Hajj and Umrah. Sama is also known as tannoura in Egypt and other Arabic-speaking nations.

Though most often associated with Islam in Turkey, particularly with Konya, Sufi whirling has a wide distribution. Among Sunnis, it is practiced by the aforementioned Mevlevi Order, as well as by the Chishti Order most common in the Indian Subcontinent. It had likely also been practiced in Persia and Khorasan before the rise of the Safavids, and subsequent conversion of Persia to Shia Islam; and spread from Persia to Anatolia and South Asia, along with metaphysical theories such as fana and Wahdat al-wujūd. Among non-Sunnis—syncretic Ghulat movements, such as Alevism and Bektashism, also practice Sufi whirling. Both are associated with popular religion in the Ottoman Empire, though they are rare among Turks today; Alevism mostly survives among an ethnoreligious group among the Kurds, while Bektashism largely survives in Albania. In South Asia, whirling is also practiced by Qalandars—Islamic mystics who tend to eschew formal sects in favour of an antinomian stance, and may openly syncretise their practices with those of religions.

Some Muslims, particularly Wahhabi and Salafi Muslims, view whirling as a heretical practice. They contend that the use of music in general is forbidden in worship, and that the physical sensations associated with whirling are akin to intoxication. Defenders of the practice argue that whirling is not "intoxicating" in the sense of alcohol, but is meditative and ecstatic; and that music can be used to aid spiritual growth, if one has the proper intention and guidance. This was the attitude taken by Imam al-Ghazali in the fifth chapter of The Alchemy of Happiness.

== See also ==
- International folk dance
- An Dro, a Breton circle dance
- Attan, a dance performed by Pashtun people in Afghanistan and Pakistan
- Dabke Levantine folk dance
- Faroese dance
- Halay Turkish folk dance
- Hora (dance) Southeastern European (Balkan) circle dance
- Khigga, an Assyrian circle dance
- Kochari Armenian folk dance
- Tamzara Armenian folk dance

== Bibliography ==
- Drumbeat, the South African circle dancing journal.
- Grapevine, the quarterly journal of Circle Dance Friends. ISSN 1752-4660
- Sela, Jonida (2017). "Values and Traditions in Ritual Dances of All-Year Celebrations in Korça Region, Albania". International Conference "Education and Cultural Heritage". Vol. 1. Association of Heritage and Education. pp. 62–71.
- Steiner-Karafili, Enit (2010). "Byron and the Albanians: Unearthing Identities". Studia Albanica (2): 137–147. ISSN 0585-5047.
- Tirta, Mark (2004). Petrit Bezhani (ed.). Mitologjia ndër shqiptarë (in Albanian). Tirana: Mësonjëtorja. ISBN 99927-938-9-9.
- Useini, Rini (2024). "Ethnology as a Vital Manifestation, (Folk Rites and Practices)". Philosophica. 11 (22–23). University of Tetova: 160–166. doi:10.62792/ut.philosophica.v11.i22-23.p2732. ISSN 2671-3020.
- Xhemaj, Ukë (1983). "Zjarri në besimet popullore shqiptare" [The Fire in Albanian Folk Beliefs]. In Mark Krasniqi, Ukë Xhemaj (ed.). Trashëgimia dhe tranformimi i kulturës popullore: materiala nga sesioni shkencor, mbajtur në Prishtinë më 7-8 shtator 1979. Albanological Institute of Prishtina. pp. 104–121.
