= Gaura (festival) =

Hindu festival in Nepal

Gaura Parva
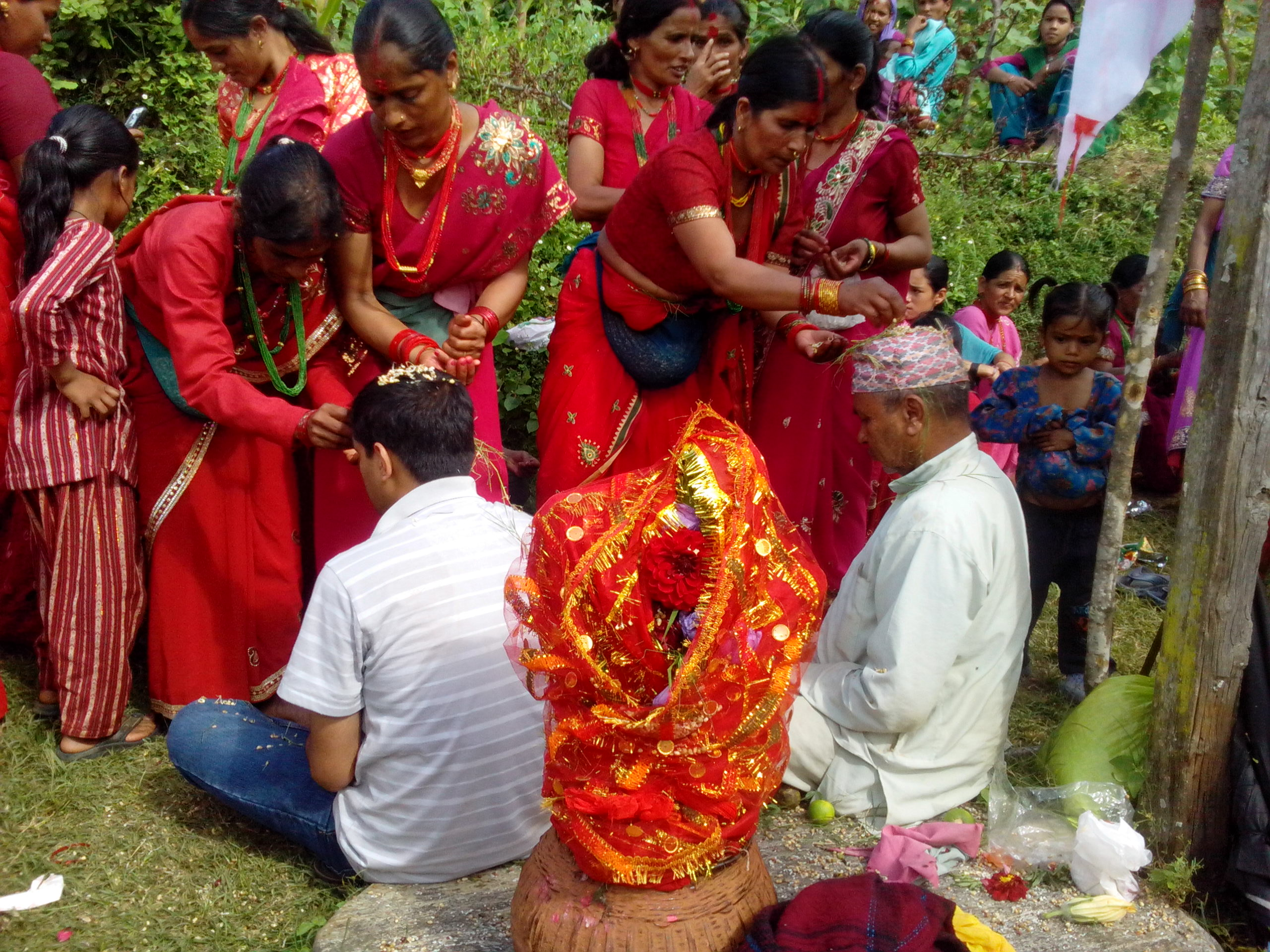
- Gaura celebration in Nepal
- Official name: गौरा पर्व
- Also called: Gamara, Saton–Athon, Satu–Athu, Gora
- Observed by: Nepali and Kumaoni Hindus
- Type: Religious
- Significance: Commemorates the wedding of Goddess Gaura/Gauri (Parvati) to Shiva
- Begins: Bhadra Krishna/Shukla Panchami
- Ends: Bhadra Krishna/Shukla Ashtami

Gaura Parva (Nepali: गौरा पर्व; Saton–Athon (Kumaoni: सातों-आठों) or Gamara) is a Hindu festival celebrated by the people residing in Sudurpashchim Province and parts of Karnali Province of Nepal as well as in Kumaon region of Uttarakhand state of India. The festival commemorates the wedding of the goddess Gaura/Gauri (Parvati) to Shiva. The festival falls in the Hindu month of Bhadra (August/September).

Over the years, the festivals has become an identifying factor for the people of Sudurpashchim region. It is considered to be one of the most important festivals of the Khas community of Sudurpashchim and Karnali provinces of Nepal. The celebration of the festival has also spread to other parts of the country. In the Nepalese capital city of Kathmandu, people also gather at Tundikhel ground nowadays on the final day of the festival and perform deuda dance. In India, the festival is celebrated in the regions around Pithoragarh district of Kumaon division of Uttarakhand state.

== Etymology ==
The name of the festival is derived from the local name of the goddess Gauri. Gauri is the consort of the Shiva, one of the principal deities of Hinduism. Since Gauri is the daughter of Himavan, the embodiment of the Himalayas, the people of hilly and mountainous region of western Nepal and Uttarakhand consider the goddess as their kin.

In Kumaon region of Uttarakhand state of India, the festival is known as Saton–Athon or Satu–Athu, translating to seventh and eight. The festival is called so because the main celebration of the festival takes place on the seventh and eight-day of the festival.

== Origin ==
There are many tales regarding the origin of the Gaura. On this occasion, women worship goddess Gauri, the wife of Shiva for their husbands' health and long age. The loving bond of Shiva (Maheshvara) and Parvati (Gaura) is celebrated during the festival. Gauri is believed to have undergone a rigorous penance to obtain Shiva as her husband. The penance of the goddess is venerated in this festival.

According to another tale, Sahastrarjuna, one of the Heheya dynasty kings, killed Brahmins of the line of Bhrigu while demanding the return of his wealth. The grieving widowed wives of the Brahmins fasted and prayed to the goddess Gauri, to protect their integrity. One of the Brahmin woman then gave birth to a skillful son who went to blind the king Sahastrarjuna. The king then apologised to the women for his crime. In honour of the benevolence and omnipotence of the goddess Gauri, this festival is said to be celebrated.

== Occurrence ==
Explanatory note on Hindu festival dates
- The Hindu calendar is lunisolar but most festival dates are specified using the lunar portion of the calendar. A lunar day is uniquely identified by three calendar elements: māsa (lunar month), pakṣa (lunar fortnight) and tithi (lunar day). Furthermore, when specifying the masa, one of two traditions are applicable, viz. amānta / pūrṇimānta. If a festival falls in the waning phase of the moon, these two traditions identify the same lunar day as falling in two different (but successive) masa. A lunar year is shorter than a solar year by about eleven days. As a result, most Hindu festivals occur on different days in successive years on the Gregorian calendar.

Gaura Parva is a lunar festival. The date of the festival is calculated by the official astrological committee (Panchang Samiti) every year. The occurrence of festival usually falls in the month of either August or September according to Gregorian calendar and either Shrawan or Bhadra month according to Nepali calendar.

=== Nepal ===
In Nepal, the celebration period of Gaura Parva could either fall in the bright lunar phase of Bhadra month (Bhadra śukla pakṣa) or in the dark lunar phase of the Bhadra month (Bhadra kṛṣṇa pakṣa), which is determined according to astrological calculations. The Gaura which falls on Krishna Paksha (dark lunar phase) is known as Adheri Gaura and which falls on Shukla Paksha (bright lunar phase) is known as Ujeli Gaura.

During Ujeli Gaura, the celebration of Gaura Parva begins at Bhadra māsa śukla pakṣa panchami tithi and ends on the day of Bhadra masa śukla paksha ashtami tithi. However, on the year while the rise of Agastya constellation (Canopus) is prior to Bhadra śukla ashtami, the festival is celebrated 15 days later during the dark phase of the month (kṛṣṇa pakṣa). And during Adheri Gaura, the celebration of Gaura Parva usually begins at Bhadra māsa kṛṣṇa pakṣa panchami tithi and ends on the day of Bhadra masa kṛṣṇa paksha ashtami tithi.

=== India ===
In India, the festival is celebrated from the day of Bhadra māsa śukla pakṣa panchami tithi to day of Bhadra masa śukla paksha ashtami tithi.

== Celebration ==
The major celebration of the festival lasts for four days. The festival officially begins on the day of Biruda Panchami and ends on Gaurashtami, however the preparation for the celebration is started few days earlier. The place where the idol of Gaura is to be established, needs to be painted with red clay. The clay is collected on the day of Janai Purnima (or Kushe Aunsi, for Adheri Gaura). On the next day (Pratiprada), a specific place in the house, where rituals are to be carried out, is cleaned and then painted with clay. On the third and fourth day (Dwitiya and Tritiya), the celebrants clean their house and gather items required for the celebration. On the fourth day (Chaturthi), the seeds that are to be soaked on the day after, are collected and cleaned.

=== Biruda Panchami ===
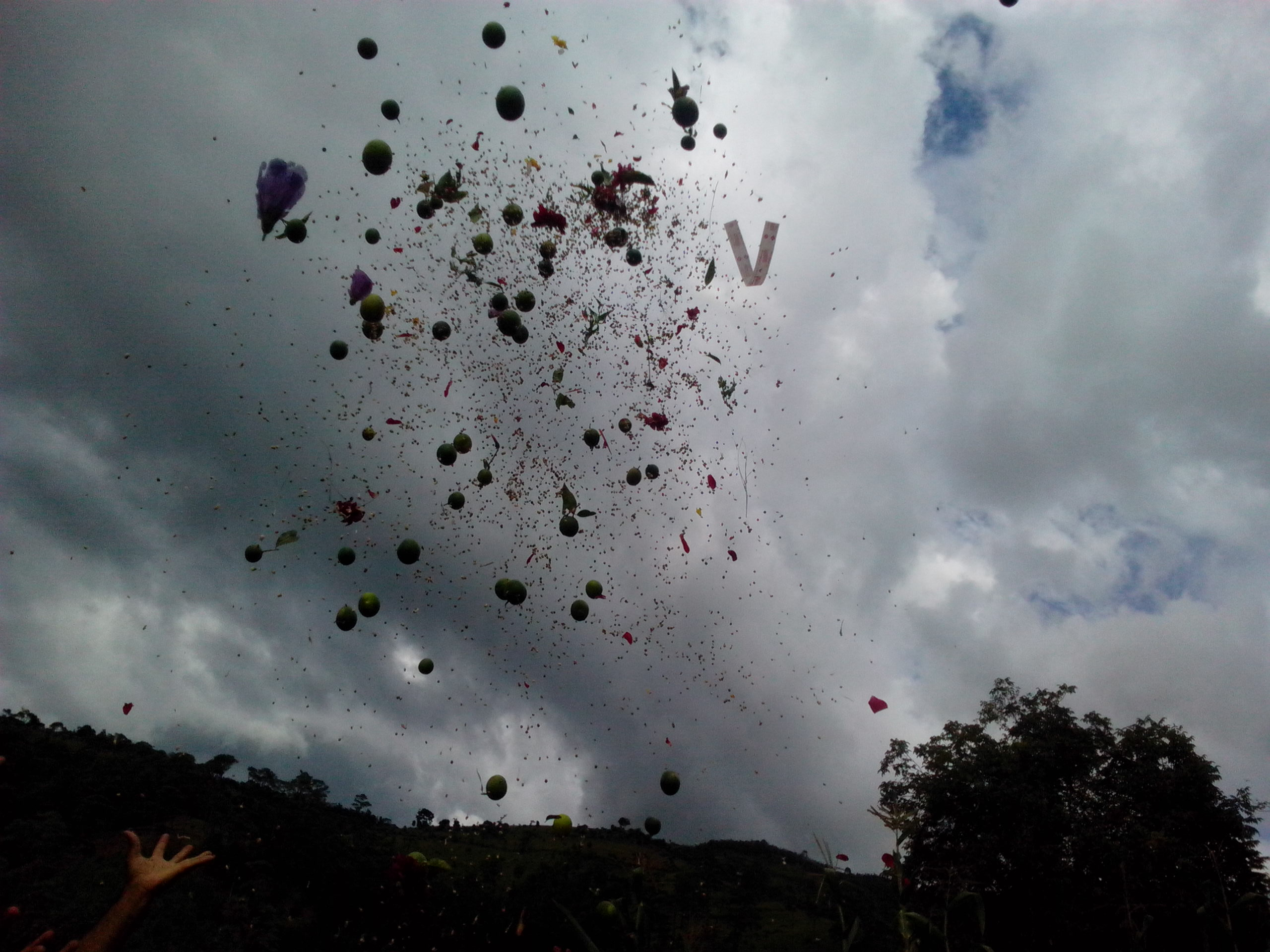
Biruda (soaked grains and beans) being flung up in the air on the final day of the festival. The devotees catch the grains as a prasad.

The festival officially begins on the day of Biruda Panchami (fifth day of the fortnight according to Hindu calendar). On this day, the married women soak five types of seeds (wheat, horse gram, pea, rhododendron and black gram), also known as Pancha Biruda following specified rituals, in a bronze or brass vessel. The women fast for a whole day on this day.

=== Shashthi ===
In the day after, known as Shashthi (sixth day according to lunar calendar), the soaked grains are taken to nearest pond, river and spring and then washed. On this day, the women gather in the washing spot and sing deuda songs and dance. The grains are then brought back to the house.

=== Saptami ===
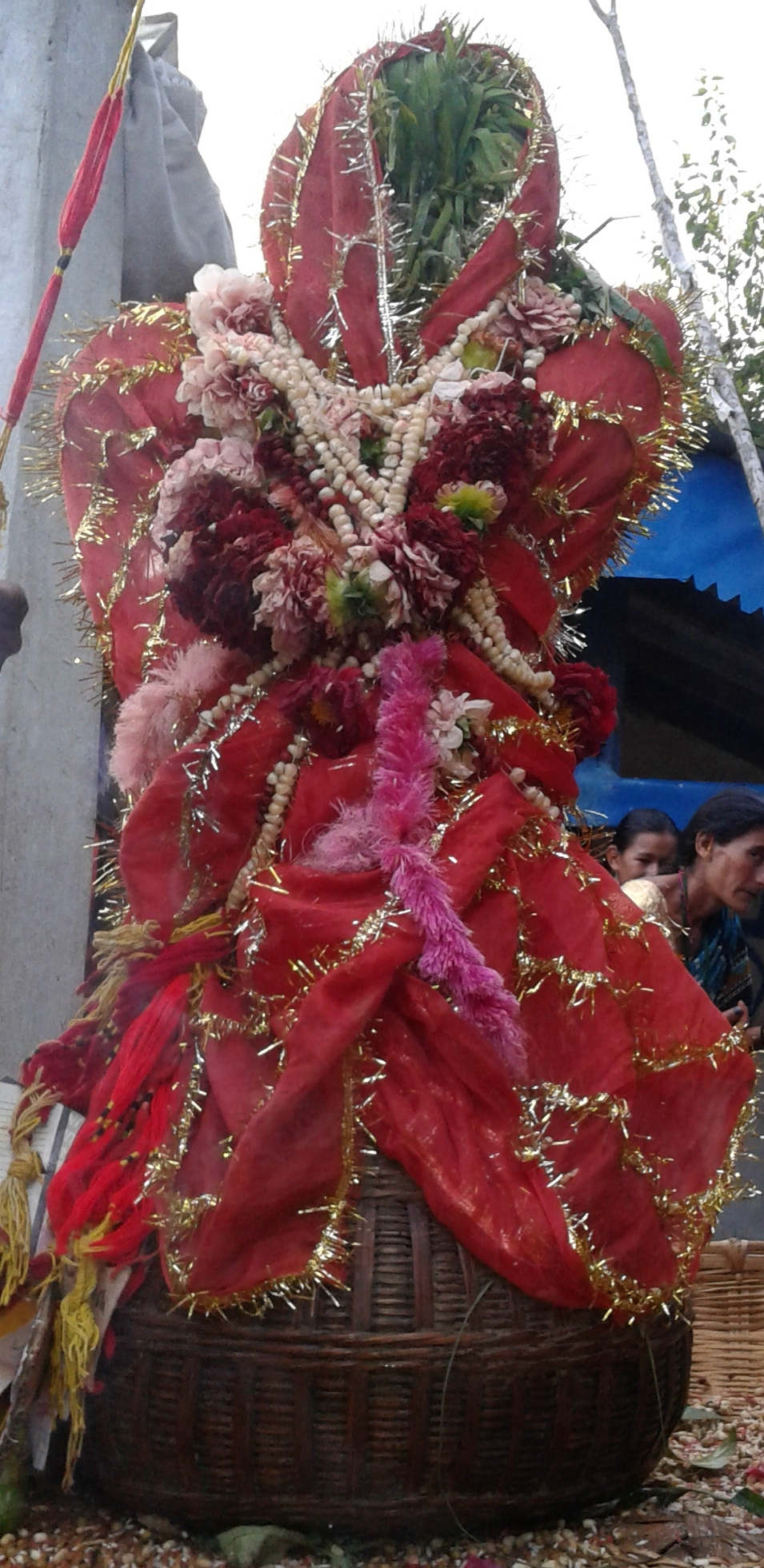
Idol of goddess Gaura

On the day of Saptami (seventh day according to lunar calendar), the Biruda is taken to nearest temple. The women pluck plants of five different grains from a specified field and take it to the village elder's house. The house where the plants are taken is known as Gaura Ghar. In absence of village elder, the celebration could be carried out in any specified house.

An idol of goddess Gaura is made using the grasses. The grasses are kept in a bamboo basket and covered with red cloth. The women performing the ritual fast for the whole day and wear a holy thread made of dubo grass on their neck. In the evening the idol is worshipped and different garment and cosmetic items are offered to the goddess.

=== Ashtami/Athebali/Gaurashtami ===
The next day of Ashtami (eighth day according to lunar calendar, also known as Athebali and Gaurashtami) is the most important day of festival. On this day, the women gather at a place known as Gaura khalo and fast and sing prayers dedicated to Gauri and Maheshvara. In the afternoon, married women who had soak Biruda and completed the rituals, offer blessings to their relatives for good health and prosperity.

An idol of Shiva is made using stones or wood. The wedding ceremony of goddess Gaura and Shiva is performed using those idols. The women carry the idols on their head and dance singing folk religious songs. The soaked biruda is offered as prasada to people on this day. The idol are then dispersed on the nearest river after five to eleven days and the festival concludes.

The deuda dance is major part of this festival in which participants hold hands and form a circle as they stepped to traditional music. Apart from the many ceremonies that happen during this festival, it is the occasion for married women to put on the sacred thread.

== See also ==
- Gangaur, a similar festival celebrated in Rajasthan, India around the month of March/April.
- Gauri Habba
