= Ghatu (dance) =

Nepalese dance form of Gurung people

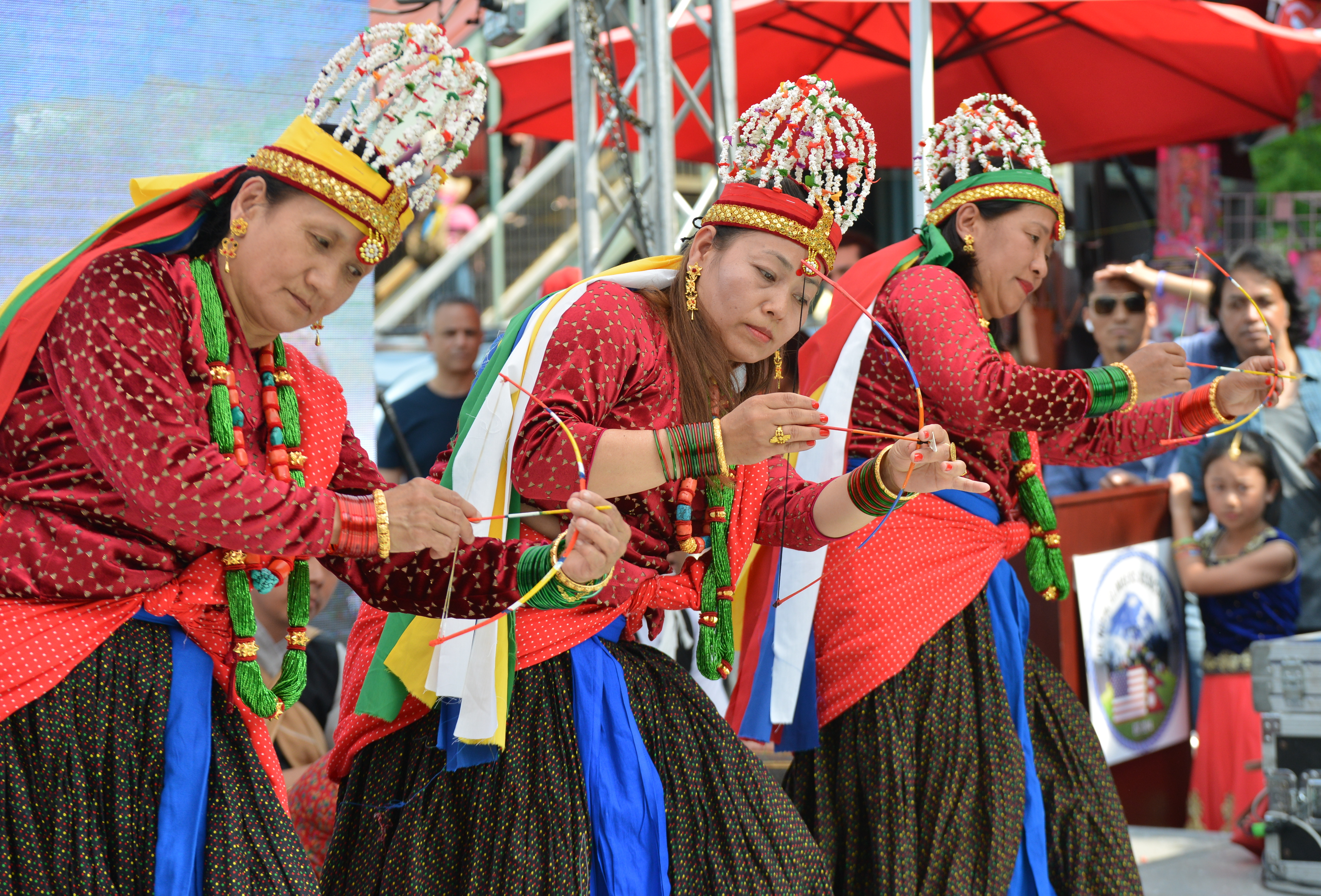
- Women performing Ghatu dance during Everest Day 2019 in New York City
- Native name: घाटु नाच
- Genre: Nepalese folk dance
- Inventor: Gurung people
- Origin: Western Nepal

Ghatu dance is a folk dance of the Gurung community of western Nepal. The dance is performed mainly during Baisakhi Purnima (full moon day of the Nepali month Baisakhi) festival. The dance is started on the previous new moon day of the same month. The dancers are selected on the day of Shree Panchami and then trained for three/four months. Besides the Gurung community, the dance is also performed by people of the Magar, Dura, Balami and Kumal communities. The word Ghatu is derived from the Gurung word Ghaघा (meaning a never-healing wound) Tuटु (meaning sewing) combing both word become Ghatu घाटु. As explained by Ghatu Gurus this dance is performend remembering tragic story of Gurung King and Queen.

== Performance ==
In Ghatu dance performance, the story of king Pashramu and queen Yambawati (or Champawati) is presented, it is believed that they originated in Lamjung district pas gau village which is predominant by Gurung people, this village itself carries King Name Parshramu (pas gau). Among the two main Ghatu dancers (known as Ghatusari), one plays the role of the king and other plays the role of the queen. King Pashramu goes on a hunt where he meets Yambawati. They marry each other. They have a child. King Pashramu goes on a war, where he dies. The queen then decides to go on a Sati and immolate herself on her husband's pyre. The dancers goes in a trance state during the dance.

There are two type of Ghatu dances:

- Bahramase Ghatu
- Sati Ghatu

Bahramase Ghatu could be performed throughout the year and the daily activities of people such as farming and domestic work are presented in this Ghatu. Sati can only be performed from Shree Panchami (December/January) to Baisakh Purnima (April/ May.) In Sati Ghatu, the main story of the king and queen is presented and during the dance, the dancers goes in a trance like state (known to be as being possessed by Kusunda). The dancers then dance in meticulously slow steps.

The Ghatu song is usually sung by the men, which is accompanied by the Madal drum. The song is passed orally from generation to generation. Alongside the story of Pashramu and Yambawati, different daily domestic and agricultural practice are also presented. The performance is divided into multiple parts known as Dandi.

On the night before the dance, the villagers have a feast (known as dar). On the day of the dance, the priest and dancers only eat fruits. After performing special puja, the dance is begun.

The dance is concluded on the day of Baisakh Purnima. The dance is concluded on some specific temples and river basins with official rituals by the priest. After the dance is concluded with official rituals, the performance of the dance is restricted until Shree Panchami. Although Bahramase Ghatu (transl. of all twelve months) could be performed throughout the year, it is also generally avoided until the day of Shree Panchami.

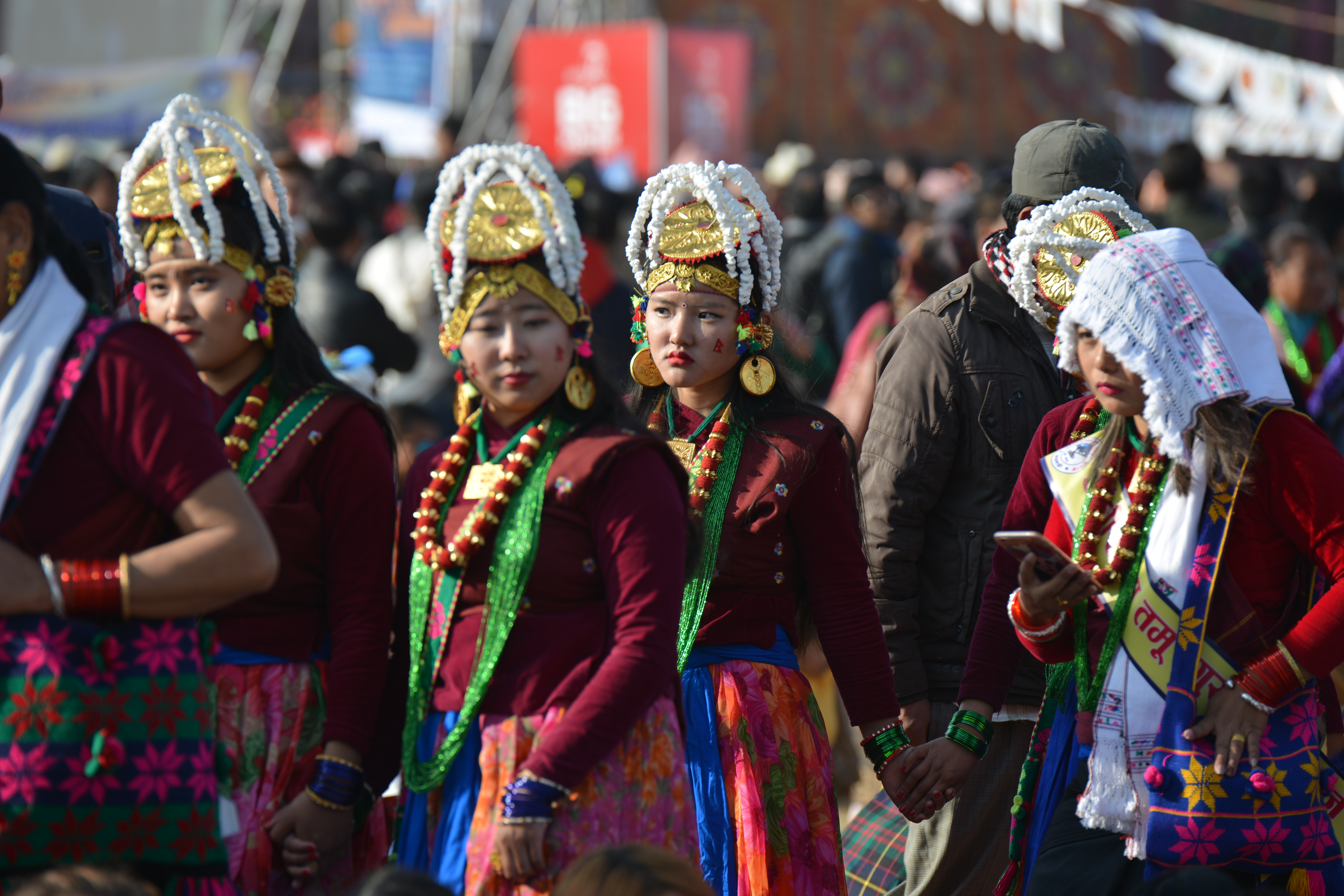
Ghatu Dance in Tamu Lhosar (Gurung new year) celebration (2018)

== Origin ==
Since the tradition is handed over orally, the exact origin of the dance were uncertain before but recent day research indicate Gurung are the actual inventor of this dance and was adopted by other community like Magar, dura, kumal. There were many anomalies between the dance practice and the general practice of Gurung people before because Gurung people follow Buddhist, Bon and Local Hinduism, before that animism and shamanism have also been found, while the dance is related to Hindu customs. Many aspects of the dance including Sati are alien to Gurung culture but later research found out that Ghatu dance were started to perform around 16th century after the death of Gurung King in that time period Hiduism have started spreading in those region with the influx of aryan people. Though the language of the song is also not in Gurung or any related language but in some Indo-Aryan language close to old Nepali language with influence of Awadhi, Bhojpuri and Tharu languages. It is also speculated that the queen Yambawati may be a woman from the southern plains who brought the song with her. King Pashramu and queen Yambawati are also considered to be the sixteenth century king and queen of the Lamjung kingdom of Nepal.

== Costume and props ==
The dancers are dressed in Gurung cultural dress and jewelries. A crown made of flowers and roasted paddy is also worn by the dancers. Various props such as horse for the king, comb for the queen. bow and arrow are made each year by the people, which are used during the dance.

== Selection of the dancers ==
The dancers of Ghatu dance are known as Ghatusari. Traditionally, Ghatusari are selected on the day of Shree Panchami after a special puja. Prepubescent girls without any scar in their bodies and whose hair has not been trimmed since birth are selected as Ghatusari. The girls are then made to sing Ghatu songs and among them, two of the girls who are possessed by the Ghatu are chosen for the dance.

== See also ==
- Maruni
- Deuda
- Jhijhiya
