= Palam (music) =

Limbu folk song genre

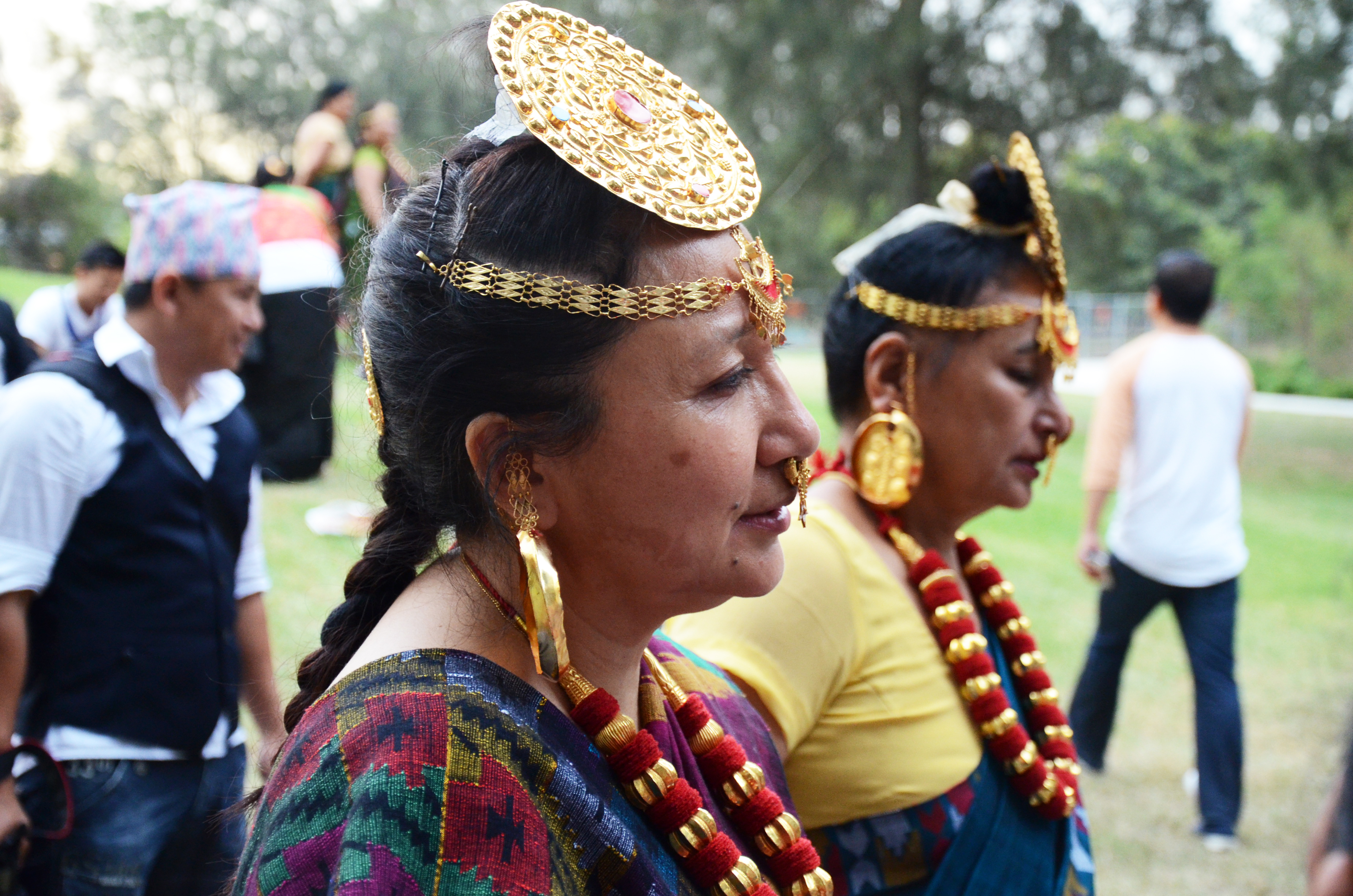
- Women in traditional Limbu outfit
- Native name: पालाम
- Stylistic origins: Folk music
- Cultural origins: Limbuwan region

Palam (Nepali: पालाम) is a Nepalese folk song of the Limbu community. It is sung in various cultural gatherings and events such as weddings, festivals, carnivals, etc. It is typically sung while performing Dhan Nach. It is sung step by step as a question and answer session between the boy and the girl. It contains various subjects such as the origin of creation, from the evolution of human civilization to love.

Traditionally, no instrument were used while singing Palam but nowadays, modern as well as traditional instruments are used.

== See also ==
- Dohori
- Deuda
