= Gauri Habba =

Hindu festival venerating Parvati

- Observed by: Hindus
- Type: Cultural, Seasonal, Religious
- Begins: Bhadrapada Shukla Tritiya
- Date: Varies per Hindu Lunisolar calendar
- Frequency: Annual

Gauri Habba (Kannada: ಗೌರಿಹಬ್ಬ, romanized: Gaurihabba) is a Hindu festival celebrated a day before Ganesh Chaturthi in Karnataka. This festival celebrates the goddess Gauri (Parvati) who is venerated as the mother of Ganesha. It is usually observed by married women and is a significant festival in Karnataka.

It is known as Hartalika in the North Indian states of Uttar Pradesh, Bihar, Jharkhand, Rajasthan, Chhattisgarh, Maharashtra and Madhya Pradesh. Gauri, the mother of Ganesha and wife of Shiva, is worshipped throughout India for her ability to bestow upon her devotees courage and power. Hindu belief has it that Gauri is the incarnation of Mahadevi and the shakti of Shiva. It is believed that on Thadige, or the third day of the month of Bhadra, Gauri comes home like any married woman comes to her parents' house. The next day, typically on Ganesh Chaturthi, Ganesha, her son, comes as if to take her back to her abode of Kailasha.

The Svarna Gauri Vrata (Svarṇagaurīvrata) is performed on the occasion to appease the goddess.

== Svarna Gauri Vrata rituals ==
On this day, Women after bathing, wear new or smart clothes and dress up the girls of the family. Then they do the 'sthapana' of either jalagauri or arishinadagauri (a symbolic idol of Gauri made of turmeric). Painted and decorated clay idols of Gauri can be bought at the local market. The goddess' idol is mounted in a plate, with a cereal (rice or wheat) in it. As this puja or ritual is to be performed with 'shuchi' (cleanliness) and 'shraddhe' (dedication), the women go to temples or to another person's house, where it is performed according to set procedures or they can perform the ritual in their own homes.

A mantapa, generally decorated with banana stem and mango leaves, is built around the idol. The Gauri is decorated with garlands, decorations made of cotton, and women have a 'gauridara' (sacred thread with sixteen knots) tied to their right wrists, as blessings of the goddess and as part of the vrata. Each of the sixteen knots is worshipped with mantras during the performance of the religious practice.

An offering of baagina occurs during the festival. At least five baaginas are prepared as part of the vrata. Each baagina usually contains a packet of arshina (turmeric), kumkum, black bangles, black beads (used in the mangalsutra), a comb, a small mirror, baLe bicchoLe, coconut, blouse piece, dhaanya (cereal), rice, toor dal, green dal, wheat or rava and jaggery cut in a cube form. The baagina is offered in a traditional mora (winnow painted with turmeric). One such baagina is offered to Gauri and set aside. The remaining Gauri baaginas are given to the married women.

== Gauri habbada mangaladravya ==
Another speciality of this festival is that the married woman's parents and brothers (tavaru maneyavaru) send all items required for worship (mangaladravya) to the married daughters of their family. Some send money as a substitute for mangaladravya. This good practice remains unchanged and keeps people closer. Newly-married women give sixteen pairs (jothe) baagina to married women (Sumangalis) and obtain their blessings. One baagina is kept for the Goddess Gauri (Gauramma). The main food items in this festival's feast are the delectable "beLe hoLige" / "Kaayee-hoLige", "Huggi" / "Chitranna" and "Bajji" .

== Customs ==
Newlywed couples are invited to the house of their in-laws and served with festive food. In the olden days, newly-wed couples had to wait till Gauri Habba to consummate their marriage. The logic behind this practice is that if a child is conceived during Gauri Habba, which falls during the winter, the child would be born nine months later, during the summer, when it would be less prone to infections. This practice has been in place for years but has declined in recent times due to modernisation and wide contraceptive options.

Unmarried girls (kanya) in the house also wear a gauridara, but it doesn't have knots, just 16 strand cotton thread dipped in turmeric and a yellow chrysanthemum looped in it. These girls must give a variant of baagina to their own sisters, (and optionally to cousins whose mothers perform the vrata). This children's baagina consists of the decorative ornamental items (metal plastic or glass bangles, metal earrings, wearable necklace, in addition to comb, mirror, biccholay) the food items are omitted. This is given along with kumkuma (vermilion), betel leaf, betel nut, and fruit (small fruit other than coconut), and dakshine in small amount (gift money).

== Gallery ==
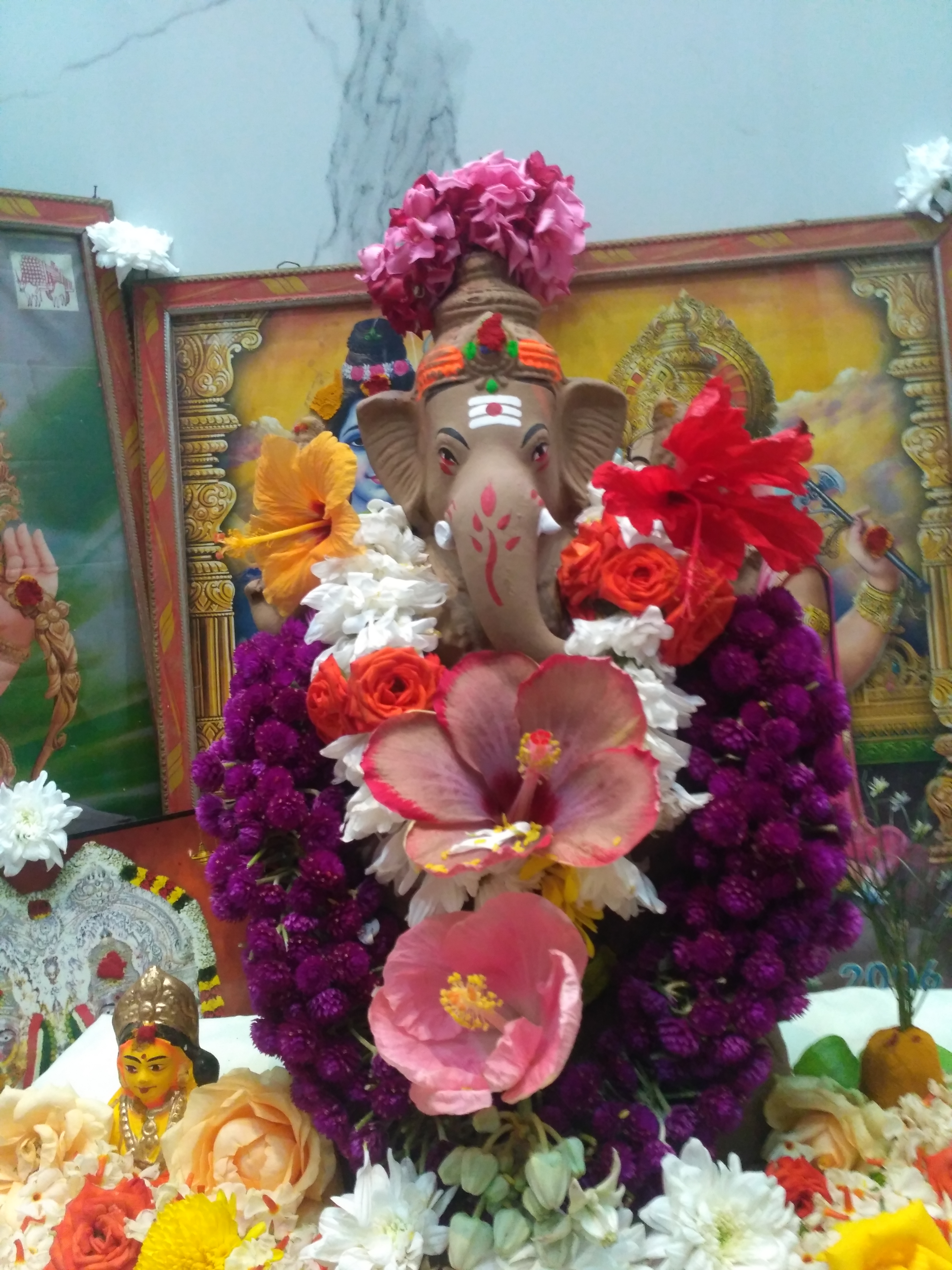
Gauri with Ganesha

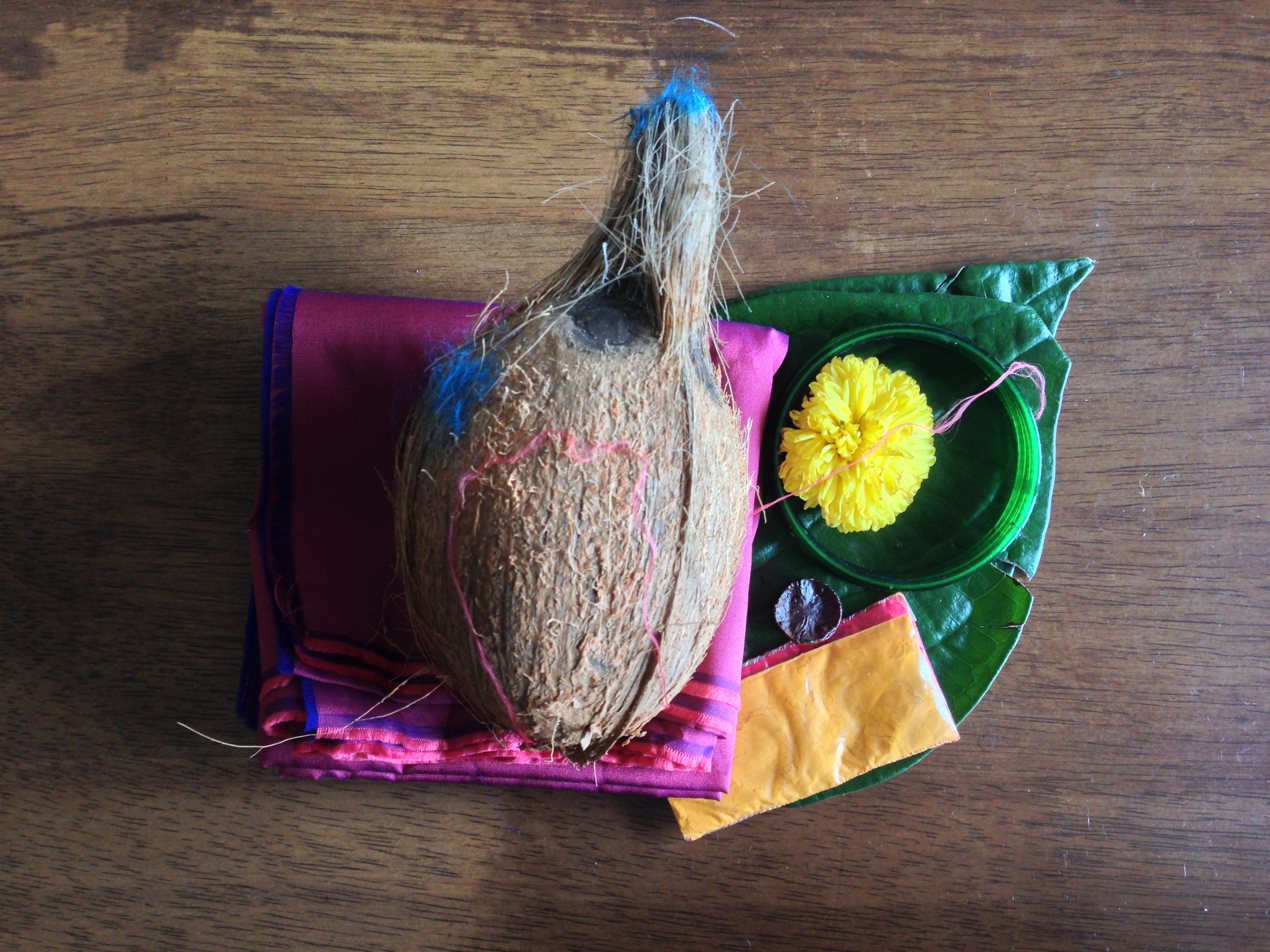
Gauri Baagna contents part 1

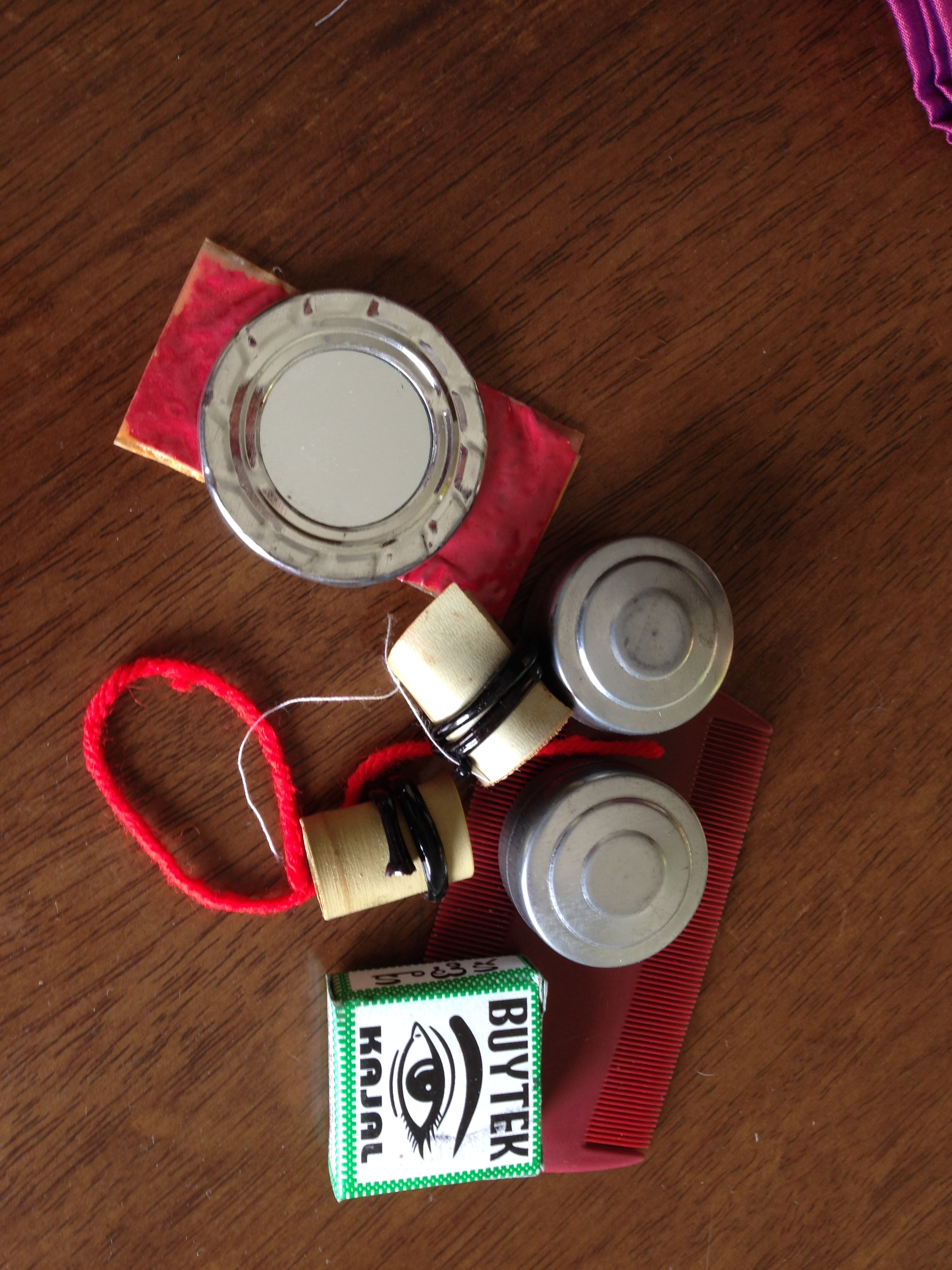
Gauri Baagna contents part 2

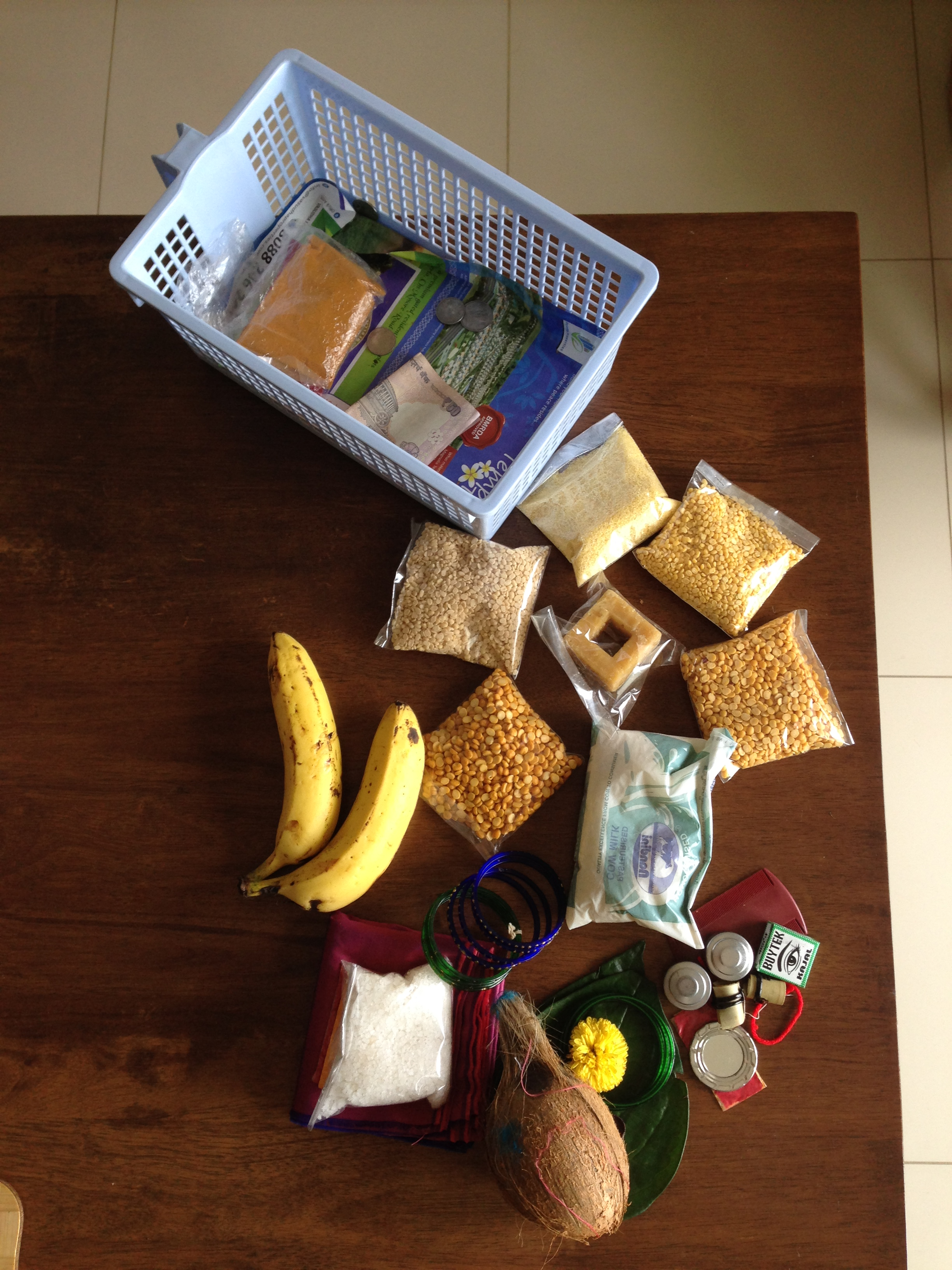
Gauri Baagna contents part 3

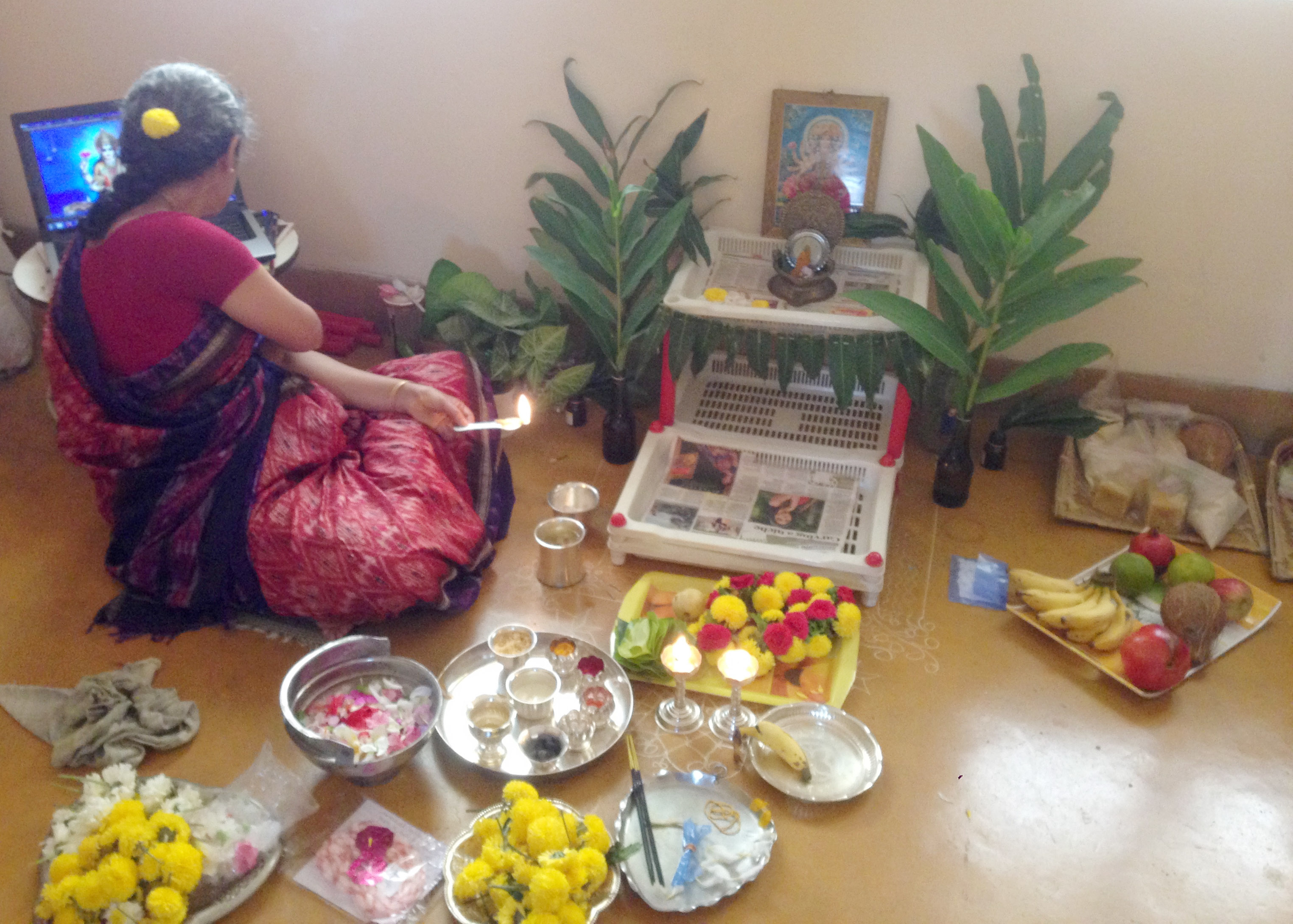
Svarna Gauri Vrata

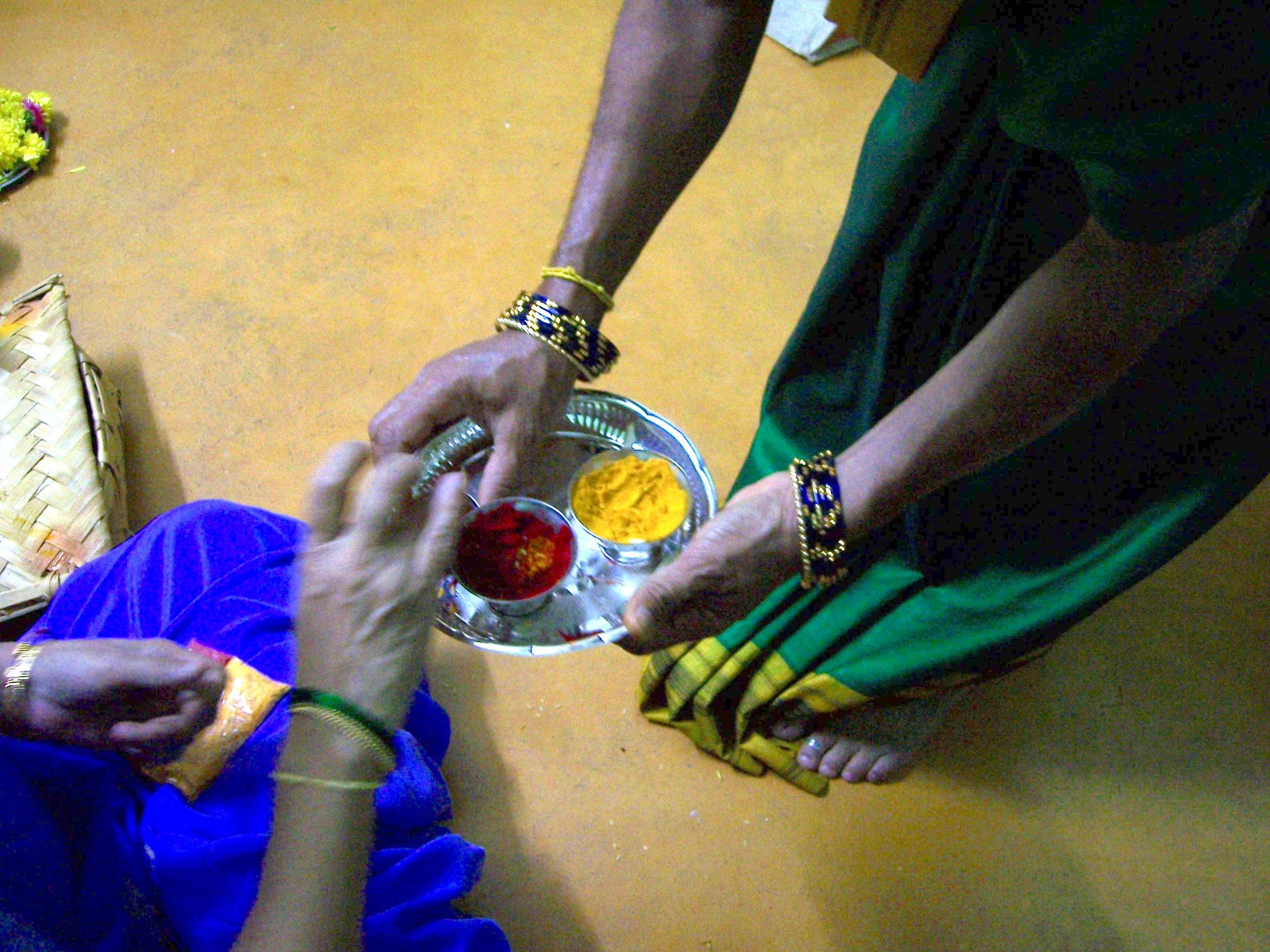
Gauri Habba Protocol - Giving Arashina and Kumkuma

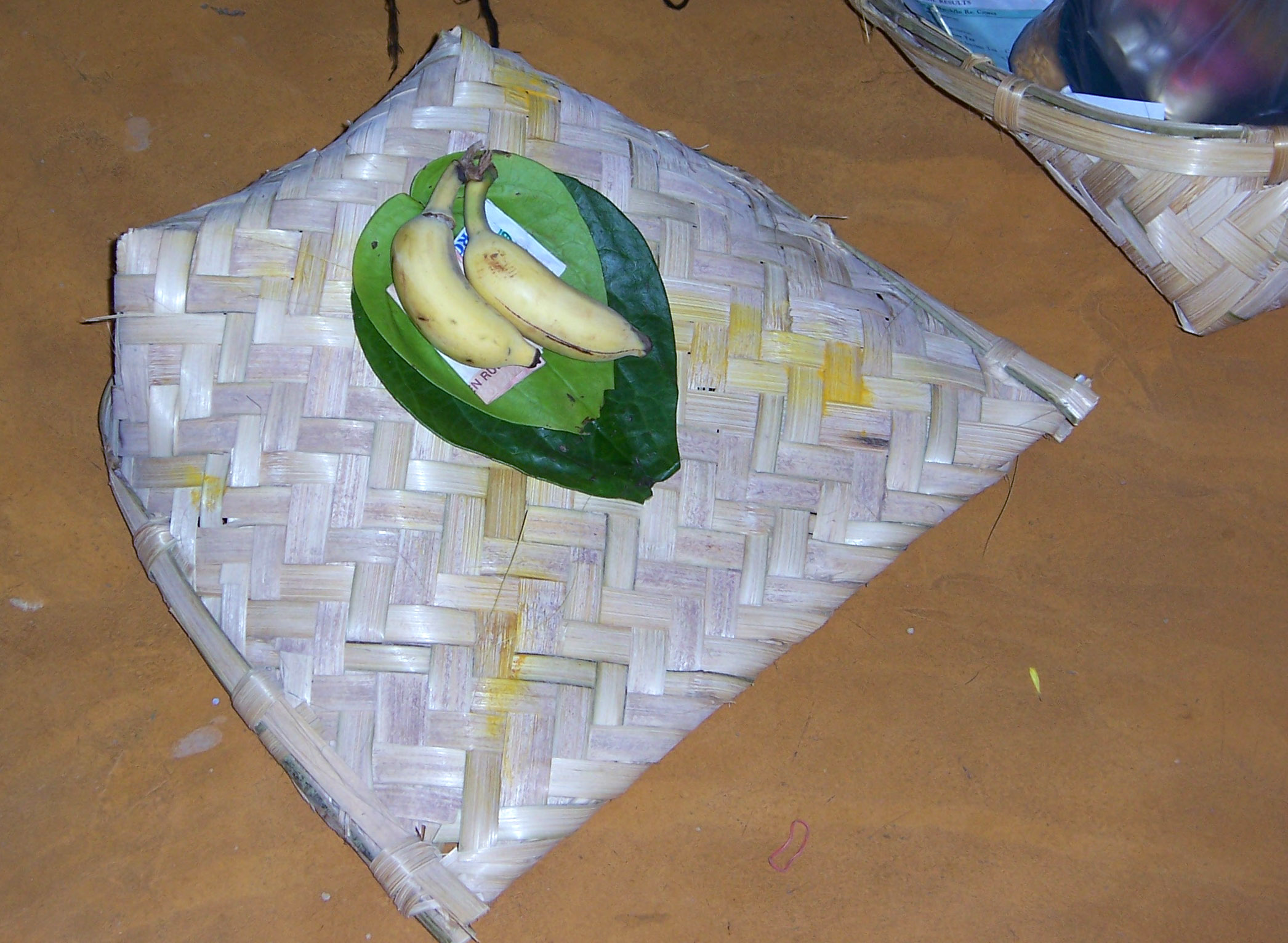
Gauri Baagna Container

== See also ==
- Gaura (festival)
