= Sangini =

Nepalese dance form

- Native name: सङ्गिनी
- Etymology: Female friends
- Genre: Folk dance
- Origin: Hilly region of Nepal

Sangini (Nepali: संगिनी) is a particular type of song and dance performed by the Nepali womenfolk during the religious festival Tihar and Teej. It originated in the hilly regions of Nepal and is performed by women from Nepal and parts of India and Bhutan.

== Description ==
The Sangini dance is performed on other occasions also for entertainment but not on a big scale. The women folk of the village perform Sangini dance in the courtyard of the house or temples amid the green sylvan surroundings. The dancers themselves sing Songs. This dance belong to the high caste of Nepali community among the Brahmin and Chettris. The married away daughters come from afar and assemble in the house of their parents to take part in the dance. They meet their long forgotten friends there and take part in the dance with them. In this dance Ladies perform Sangini dance holding plates of Kalasha or Diyo or carrying Kalash on the head.

== Mythological story ==
The mythological story of Sangini goes back to the mythic story of Hindu god Shiva and goddess Parvati. It was goddess Parvati whose heart was filled with torment and agony to see many of the young widows who lost their husband in the early age. Goddess Parvati pleads to Shiva to save the young married girls from their curse. Shiva advocated Parvati to ask these young married girls to offer puja in his name. Hence, it is possibly believed that they would be saved from being untimely widow if they offer pujas to Lord Shiva.

== See also ==
- Dhan Nach
- Maruni
