= Biruda =

Crop with Hindu significance

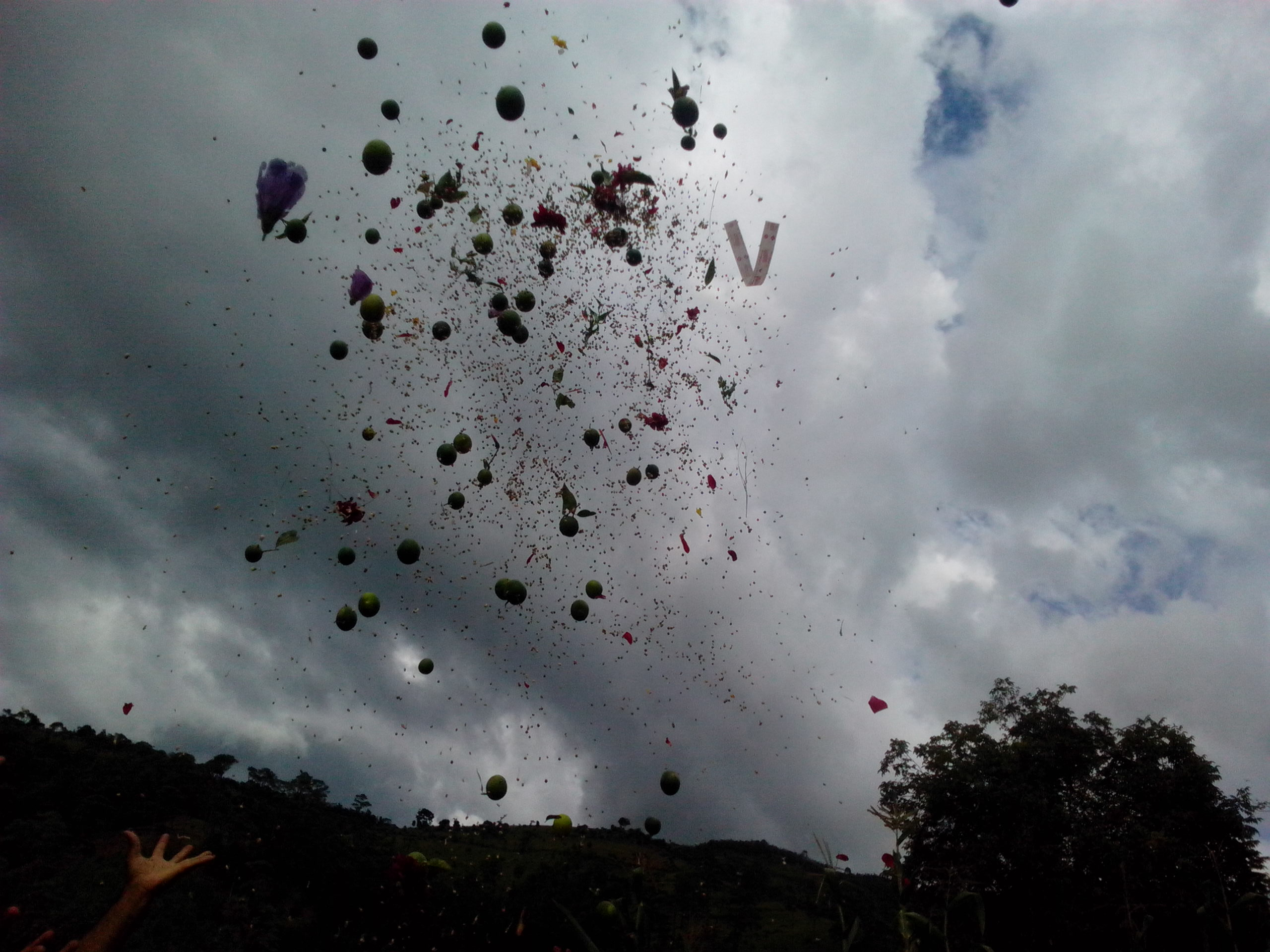
Biruda (soaked grains and beans) being flung up in the air on the final day of the festival. The devotees catch the grains as a prasada.

Biruda (Nepali: विरुडा) is a mixture of five seeds of crops used for worshipping and blessing during the Gaura festival. The mixture is composed up of five different types of grains and pulses (wheat, horse gram, pea, rhododendron and black gram). This festival is mainly celebrated in Sudurpashchim Province of Nepal and the Biruda mixture is mainly eaten in this region. On the event of the Gaura festival, it is believed that the god Mahesh (Shiva) was married to the goddess Gaura (Parvati).

In the day of Panchami, Biruda is kept with water in a copper pot to make them wet. The next day the mixture is washed and water is replaced with full customs and worship of Goddess Gaura. Next day this process recontinues. Finally, fourth day from Panchami called Ashtami, all women who wore a sacred thread dubi dhaga fast for good fortune of them and their family members. Whole day women worship goddess Gaura chanting different mantras and folk songs. At last near to end every one gets up, Biruda and fruits are kept in pieces of cloths and they are thrown towards sky, everyone starts to catch anything they can, it is believed that it is good for fortune to catch these things.
