= Maruni =

Nepalese folk dance

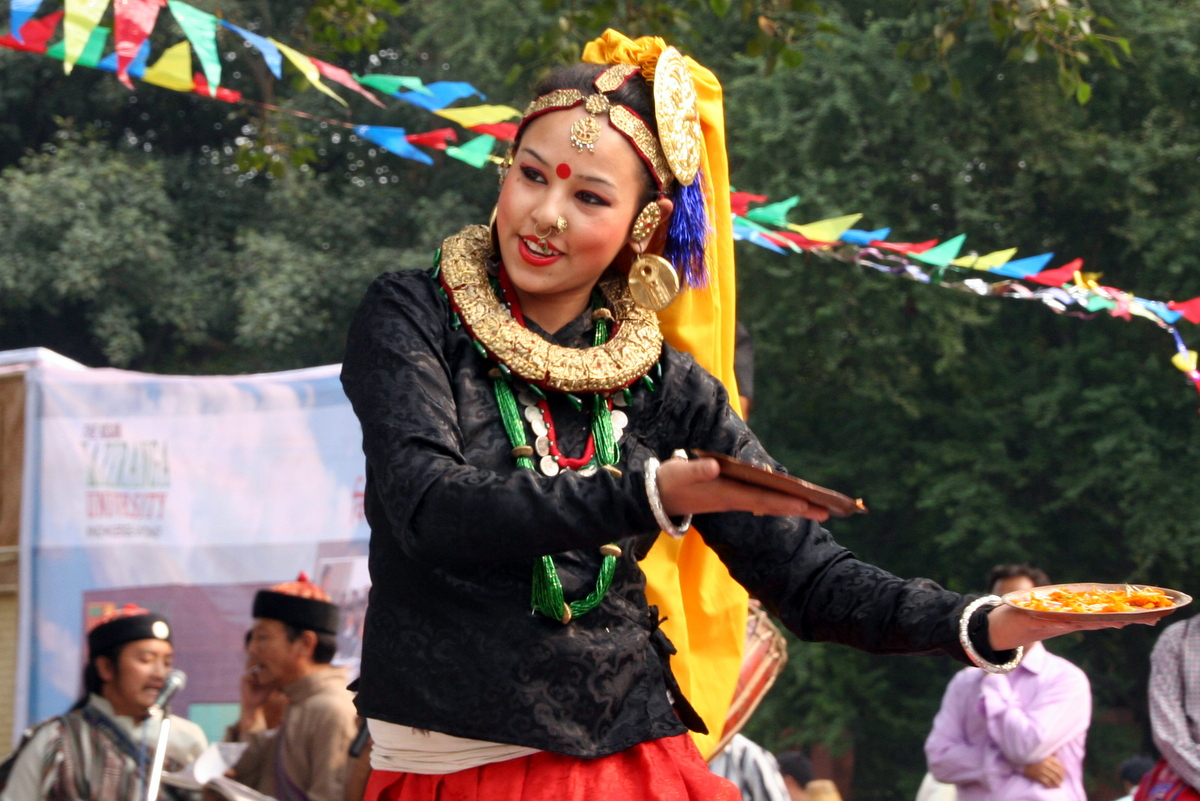
- A young woman from Sikkim performs Maruni dance.
- Native name: मारुनी नाच
- Genre: Nepalese folk
- Inventor: Magars
- Origin: Magarat of Nepal

Maruni is a Nepalese folk dance of the Magar community. It is popular in Nepal and among Nepalese diasporic communities in Bhutan, India (Darjeeling, Assam, Sikkim) and Myanmar. It is one of the oldest and most famous dances of the Nepalese community residing in these regions, originally performed as part of Dashain and Tihar festival. Dressed colorfully with rich ornaments, the dancers dance to commemorate "the victory of good over evil", accompanied by the traditional Nepali Naumati Baja orchestra.

Maruni Nach has been one of the significant identity of the Magar community since from the distant past until the present moment. In recent years, the dance has become in danger of extinction, due to lack of interest by young people in learning it. That fear has begun to mobilize some communities. Today, the community is pushing its young people to preserve the Maruni Nach.

== History ==
The dance originated with the Magar community, and later on, people from the various communities started adopting it. Maruni as danced in Western Nepal is different than in other places. Maruni and Sorathi dances were created in Western Nepal by the Magar community, and Magars who migrated to Eastern Nepal started to make small changes as they performed it there too. Nowadays other communities like Gurung, Kirat, and Khas also dance the Maruni dance on various occasions.

In the Balihang festival, Maruni, Sorathi, and Hurra (dances performed by the eastern Magars also known as Deusi Nach) are performed. It is believed to be originated from Magar Army during the 14th century on the behalf of sick King Balihang Rana Magar of Palpa, Pokhara Butwal. Balihang Rana Magar was a king during the 15th century (of Palpa, Pokhara, Baldeng, Butwal & Gorkhapur) during which the kingdom was extended from Palpa to Butwal and Gorakhpur. Deusi Re means "Priest-King" and Bahilo means "Let us help" which are related to the Balihang Rana Magar.

With time, Maruni was performed even during many personal events, especially marriages. Maruni is performed by both men and women who dress in colorful clothes, shining ornaments, and nose rings. Maruni performed by the Eastern Magars goes through several parts, like "Jhyaure, Saran Maruni, Sorathi Garra, Khyali, Maruni performed for the welfare of the danced house and at the last Maruni performed for accomplishing the dance. The dancers are usually accompanied by a clown who is called 'Dhatu Waray' which means liar but acts as comedian/joker. In the many forms of Maruni, nine unique instruments are used with the dance and this is called the Naumati Baja.

== See also ==
- Sangini
- Dhan Nach
- Ghatu
- Sorathi
