= Naumati baaja =

Nepalese and Himalayan musical instruments

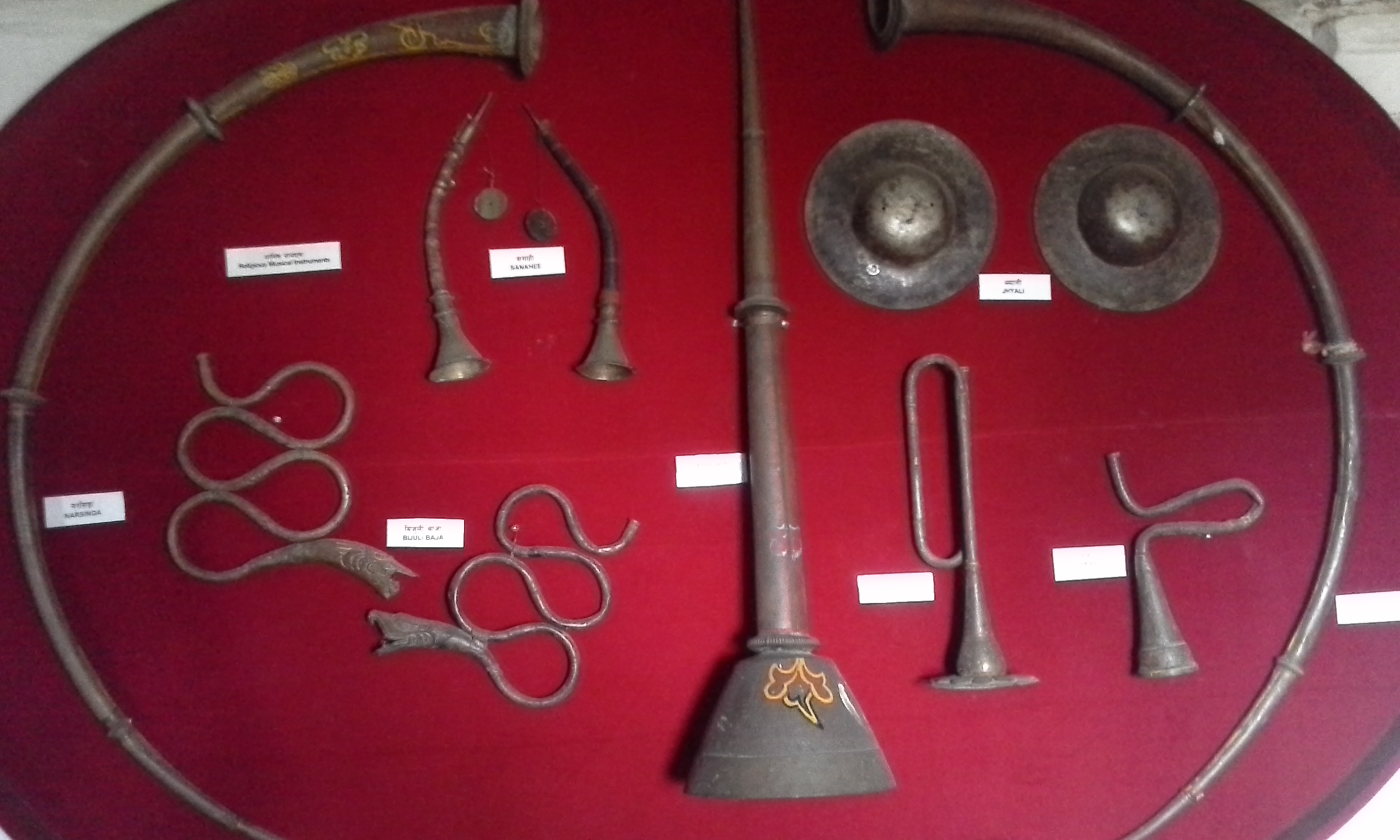
It is a collection of 9 musical instruments played on festivals, marriage ceremony in Nepal.

Naumati Baja (Nepali: नौमती बाजा, lit. 'nine musical instruments') is a group of nine traditional musical instruments played in Nepal and Himalayan region of Sikkim, Darjeeling and Assam during certain auspicious occasions like weddings. It includes the following musical instruments:

Narsingha: a long, C-shaped trumpet

Karnal: a wide-mouthed, straight trumpet with a bell

Damaha: a large kettledrum

Baauntal: one instrument

Sanai: two instruments

Tyamko: one instrument

Dholaki: one instrument

Jhyali/Jhaymta: one instrument

Naumati is a more comprehensive form of the Panchai Baaja. Panchai Baaja (or a band of five instruments) is traditionally played to bring good luck. There is a reference in the scriptures that Panchai Baaja was played in the Dvapara Yuga on the auspicious occasion of the Christening Ceremony of the Lord Krishna. The Panchai Baaja represents the five metals and while designing these instruments, the images of five deities viz; Ganesh, Vishnu, Shiva, Goddess and the Sun were kept as the background. Later, four more instruments were added to this set of five instruments and called Naumati Baaja (nine musical instruments).
