= Dhan Nach =

Limbu folk dance

- Native name: Yalang ᤕᤠᤗᤠᤅ
- Etymology: Paddy dance
- Genre: Folk dance
- Origin: Limbuwan region

Dhan Nach (Nepali: धाननाच) / Yalang (Limbu: ᤕᤠᤗᤠᤅ Yalang) or (English: Paddy dance) is a traditional Limbu folk dance, which originated in the Limbuwan region of Nepal. It is performed by people from Limbu (Yakthung) communities, native to Eastern Nepal as well as Darjeeling, Kalimpong and Sikkim regions of India. The dance is accompanied by a folk song known as Palam.

== Etymology ==
Dhan Nach in Nepali translates to paddy dance (Dhan translates to paddy, and nach to dance). The dance is also commonly known as Yalang. It is known by multiple names among Limbu communities according to their languages. It is known as Chalakma in Chhathare Limbu language, and as Yalakma in Panthare Limbu language. In every language, the name of the dance translates to paddy dance.

== Origin mythology ==
According to local legend, there was a drought in a village and people were dying of starvation. Then Makcharepu (Limbu: ᤔᤠᤰᤆᤖᤣᤐᤢ; transl. paddy bird), a bird brought some seeds of Khaiya type of paddy and gave it to the villager to cultivate it. The villager did so and received a bountiful harvest. But the birds started eating most of the harvest. The villagers tried to shoo the bird away but the birds demanded the harvest since they were the ones who brought the seed. The villagers were unable to refute their claim and agreed. The birds would directly eat the rice as soon as it was thrashed. So, the people started to loudly shout " Ha... Ha... Ha..." to scare away the birds, which later became the rhythmic Palam song. While singing Palam, the people would hold hand dance over the paddy harvest which would separate the husk away from the rice. After which, the people started performing Dhan Nach every year during the month of Mangsir.

== Tradition ==
The dance is performed during multiple occasions such as marriage, festivals such as Udhauli, carnivals and celebrations. It can be performed in pairs or in groups. It is performed by men and women without any blood relations holding hands and dancing either in a straight line or a circulus. Historically, the dance was performed for seven days and seven nights.

In recent days, the dance is on the verge of extinction with young people's lack of participation. However, various cultural organizations are raising awareness for preservation and promotion of this dance form.

== In popular media ==
In 2021, a short film titled Kheda was released to raise awareness about the dance form.

== See also ==
- Lakhey
- Sangini
- Maruni
