= Deuda (genre) =

Nepalese folk song genre

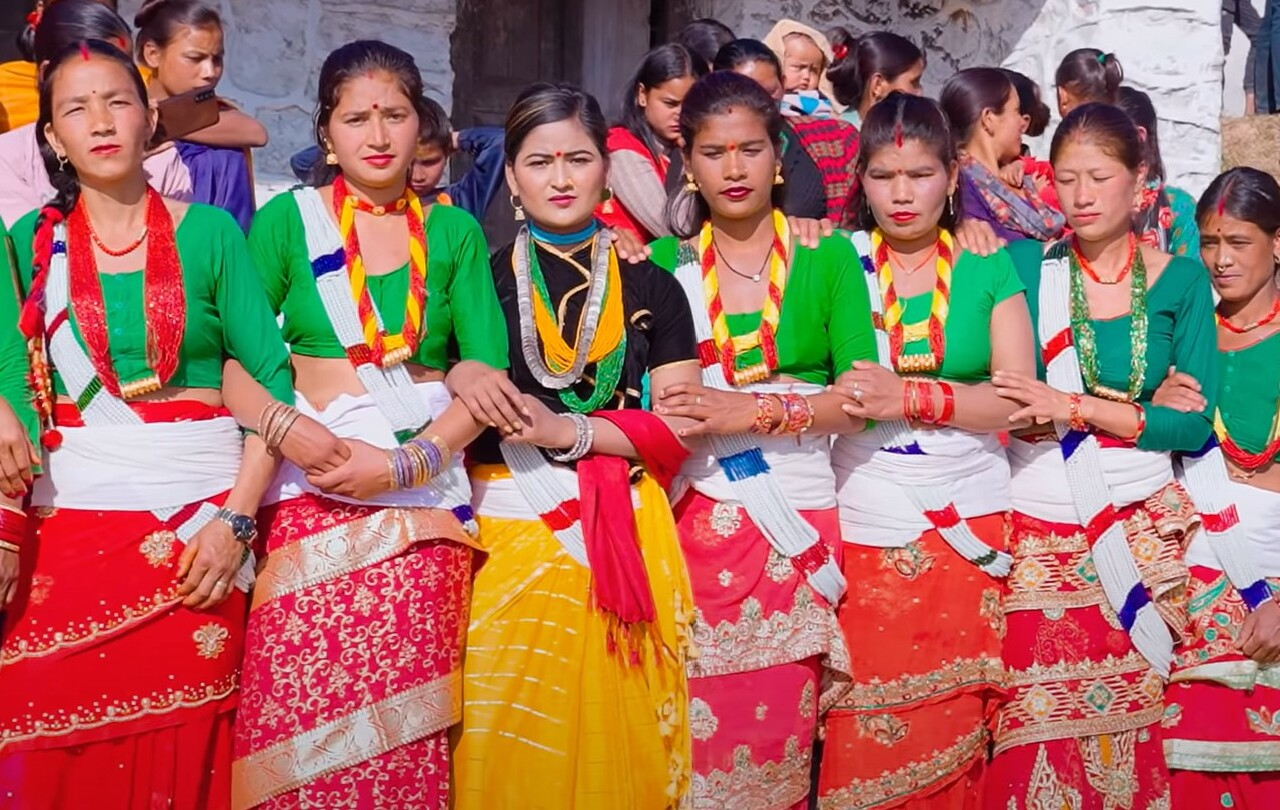
- Women holding hands and performing Deuda
- Native name: देउडा
- Stylistic origins: Folk music
- Cultural origins: Khas people

Deuda (Nepali: देउडा) or Deuda Khel is a Nepali genre of song and dance, originated by Khas community and performed in the Sudurpashchim and Karnali provinces of Nepal, as well as in the Kumaon Division of Uttarakhand state of India. The dance is performed by singing Deuda songs with the participants holding each others' hands and intertwining arms in a circular formulation. It is considered a part of the cultural heritage of Karnali Province.

Deuda songs are very popular in Dailekh, Kalikot, Jumla, Achham, Bajang, Doti, Dadeldhura, Baitadi, Bajura and Darchula. It is performed by group of male and female. It is performed during the feasts and festivals like Gaura Parva.

== Etymology and history ==
The word deuda means one and a half.

The dance is called so because during performance the legs are moved in slanted manners. The song sung during the dance is also known as nyaauli after a bird. The dance is known as Dhacha in Jajarkot district.

The dance form is said to be originated in the historical Khasa Kingdom in Sinja valley of Jumla district. The dance was then spread around the neighbouring regions of the valley.

== Performance ==
Verse of a song

Nepali: "Shanta bibhatsa ra sringar aadi sahayak rasaharu pani.
Pashchima ma Kangra jityeu purba pugyeu Teesta
Singha jastai bir Gorkhali angrez bhaye phista.
Kaag basyo sallika tuwa kalchya basyo khola
Aaja yo khel jitera janchu jeje hola hola."
English: Peaceful, disgusting, and erotic, among other supporting rasas as well.
In the west, we conquered Kangra; in the east, we reached Teesta.
Brave Gorkhalis like lions, while the British became helpless.
Crow perched on the top of the pine tree, blackbird perched by the river.
Today, I will leave only after winning this game, whatever may happen."

The men and women each form a group and hold hands while dancing in a circle. The song is sung without any musical instrument. The songs sung while performing Deuda is in Khas language spoken around the far-western and mid-western regions. The verse of the song alternates between question presented by male/female group and the answer by the opposite group. There are multiple subgenres of Deuda such as Thadi Bhakha, Rateri, Hudkeuli and Dhamari.

=== Song ===
Deuda dance song is sung in folk verse. In terms of letter structure, it consists of 14 syllables in a row. The songs sung during Deuda could be of various types such as political, social, domestic, romantic, etc. The lyrics are lyrical and rhythmic in nature. Some of the lyrics may also contains historical elements such as description of the valor of Nepalese people in past.

== See also ==
- Dhan Nach
- Maruni
