= List of national dances =

This is a list of national dances. This may be a formal or informal designation. Not all nations officially recognize a national dance or dances.

== By country ==
Country	Dance(s)
Afghanistan	Attan
Albania	Shota
Algeria	Chaabi
Angola	Capoeira Angola, Kabetula, Kizomba, Kuduro, Rebita, Semba and Viola
Argentina	Tango, Pericón
Armenia	Armenian dance, Shalakho, Kochari
Australia	Corroboree, Bush dance
Austria	Ländler, Waltz
Azerbaijan	Jangi, Khanchobany, Tello
Bahamas	Quadrille, Rake-and-scrape, Heel and Toe Polka, and Scullin
Bahrain	Ardah, Liwa
Bangladesh	Baul, Bizhu dance, Marma dance, Peacock dance
Belarus	Karahod
Belize	Brukdown
Bermuda	Gombey
Bolivia	Huayno, Caporales, Diablada
Brazil	Samba, Frevo, Maculelê, Carimbó, Capoeira, Siriri, Forró, Maxixe, Coco
Brunei	Zapin
Bulgaria	Rŭchenitsa
Burma	Burmese dance
Cambodia	Romvong, Apsara Dance, Peacock Dance, Chhayam
Canada	None, Canadian stepdance unofficially; Red River Jig for Métis; jingle dance, Fancy dance and First Nations tribal dance styles dominate in areas populated by First Nations.
Cape Verde	Coladeira, Batuque
Chile	Cueca; Rapa Nui: Sau-sau and others
China	Yangge, Lion dance, Dragon dance
Colombia	Vallenato and Cumbia
Cook Islands	Ura
Costa Rica	Punto guanacasteco
Croatia	Linđo
Cuba	Danzón, Rumba, Conga Line
Cyprus	Sousta, Tatsia, Turkish Cypriot folk dances
Czech Republic	Polka
Democratic Republic of the Congo	Soukous
Denmark	Les Lanciers
Dominica	Kwadril
Dominican Republic	Merengue
Ecuador	Pasillo
Egypt	Raqs sharqi and Raqs baladi
El Salvador	Xuc
Eritrea	Quda
Ethiopia	Eskista
Finland	Finnish tango, Jenkka
Fiji	Meke
France	Gavotte, Branle, Farandole, Tambourin, Can-Can
French Polynesia	Tamure
Georgia	Khorumi, Perkhuli
Germany	Schuhplattler, Zwiefacher
Ghana	Adowa dance
Greece	Syrtos, Syrtaki, Zeibekiko, Pyrrhichios, Serra, Pentozali, Kalamatianos, Tsamiko, Ballos, Sousta
Guadeloupe	Gwo ka
Guatemala	Baile de la Conquista
Guyana	Soca
Haiti	Meringue, Compas, Kadans
Honduras	Punta
Hungary	Czardas Kalocsai
Iceland	Vikivaki
India	Bharatnatyam, Chhau, Kathak, Kathakali, Kuchipudi, Manipuri, Mohiniyattam, Odissi, Sattriya, Bhangra.
Indonesia	Legong, Pendet, Barong Ket, Ronggeng, Kebyar duduk, Saman dance
Iraq	Kurdish dance, Chobi, Khigga
Iran	Persian dance, Kurdish dance, Azerbaijani dances
Ireland	Irish stepdance
Israel	Israeli folk dancing
Italy	Tarantella, Furlana, Liscio, Monferrina
Jamaica	Quadrille
Japan	Nihon-buyō
Jordan	Dabke
Korea	Buchaechum, Ganggangsullae
Kosovo	Shota
Kuwait	Ardah, Liwa
Lebanon	Dabke
Liechtenstein	Liechtensteiner Polka
Madagascar	Hiragasy
Malaysia	Joget
Martinique	Bélé
Mauritius and Réunion	Sega
Mexico	Jarabe tapatío
Moldova	Hora
Mongolia	Biyelgee
Morocco	Reggada and Gnawa
Mozambique	Tufo
Nicaragua	Palo de mayo
Nepal	Newa dance
Netherlands	Klompendansen
New Zealand	Haka
North Macedonia	Osogovka, Teshkoto, Kopacka, Belomorski biser, Tresenica, Belomorska kitka, Pousteno, Bajrace, Berance, Berovka, Bufcansko, Vleceno, Vodensko, Gajdarsko, Gluvonemo, Dracevka, Dude Drne, Ibraim odza, Jeni jol, Kavadarka, Kalajdzisko, Komitsko, Krstacko, Lesnoto, Lisolaj, Malesevka, Oroto pocna, Pajdusko, Pembe, Postupano, Potrcano, Potrculka, Ramnoto, Ratevka, Rusalii, Rusinsko, Ratevka, Sitnoto, Skudrinka, Staro oro, Starskoto, Tikvesko, Toska, Sopkata, Cetvorka, Toska, Sopka, Tropnalo oro, Zensko camce
Norway	Hallingdans
Oman	Al-Bar'ah
Pakistan	Jhumar, Khattak, Bhangra
Palestine	Dabke
Panama	Tamborito
Papua New Guinea	Sing-sing
Paraguay	Paraguayan bottle dance, Paraguayan polka
Peru	Marinera
Philippines	Cariñosa and Tinikling
Poland	Krakowiak, Kujawiak, Mazur, Oberek, Polonaise
Portugal	Vira
Puerto Rico	Danza, Bomba and Plena
Qatar	Ardah
Romania	Căluş, Hora, Ciuleandra (dance)
Russia	Barynya, Kamarinskaya, Kozachok, Tropak, Khorovod
Saint Lucia	Kwadril
Samoa and American Samoa	Taualuga
Saudi Arabia	Ardah, Khaleegy, Mizmar
Senegal	Mbalax
Serbia	Kolo
Seychelles	Kanmtole
Slovakia	Čardáš, Karička, Odzemok
Somalia	Dhaanto
Somaliland	Saylici, Jaandheer
South Africa	Gumboot dancing and Indlamu; Volkspele among Afrikaners
Spain	Flamenco, Malagueñas (Andalusia), Jota (Aragon), Sardana (Catalonia), Pasodoble
Sri Lanka	Kandyan dance, Lowcountry dance, Sabaragamu dance
Sudan	Tambour dance
Suriname	Kaseko
Sweden	Polska, Hambo
Switzerland	Ländler
Syria	Dabke
Thailand	Thai dance
Tonga	Lakalaka
Trinidad and Tobago	Limbo, Soca, Calypso
Turkey	Zeybek, Halay, Horon
Turkmenistan	Kyushtdepdi
Turks and Caicos	Ripsaw dance, Rake-and-scrape
Ukraine	Hopak, Arkan, Tropak, Metelytsia, Kozachok, Khorovod and Kolomyjka
United Arab Emirates	Yowlah, Khaleegy and Ardah
United Kingdom	(England) English Country Dance, Rapper Sword Dance, Morris dance, English clogging, Hornpipe. (Scotland) Scottish highland dance. (Wales) Welsh clogging. (Northern Ireland) Irish stepdance.
United States	No national dance, swing and square dancing unofficially; see List of U.S. state dances; hoop dance, Grass dance, jingle dance, Fancy dance and Native American tribal dance styles dominate in areas populated by Native American tribes.
Uruguay	Tango, Pericón, Candombe
Uzbekistan	Lazgi, Tanovar
Venezuela	Joropo
Virgin Islands	Quadrille
Yemen	Al-Bara', Sharh
