= Arab folk dances =

Traditional folk dances of the Arab world

Arab dance
- Medium: Dance
- Types: Ardah · Ayyalah · Belly dance · Dabke · Fann at-Tanbura · Khaleegy · Khigga · M'alayah · Mizmar · Raqs Sharqi · Razfah · Yowlah
- Originating culture: Arab culture

Arab folk dances (Arabic: رقص عربي, romanized: raqs ʿarabiyy), also referred to as Oriental dance, Middle-Eastern dance and Eastern dance, are the traditional folk dances of the Arabs in Arab world. Arab dance has many different styles, including the three main types of folklore, classical, and contemporary. It is enjoyed and implemented throughout the Arab region, from North Africa to the Middle East.

The term "Arabic dance" is often associated with belly dancing. However, there are many styles of traditional Arab dance and many of them have a long history. These may be folk dances, or dances that were once performed as rituals or as entertainment spectacle, and some may have been performed in the imperial court. Coalescence of oral storytelling, poetry recital, and music has a long-standing tradition in Arab history. Among the best-known of the Arab traditional dances are the belly dance, the ardah, and the dabke.

Traditional dancing is still popular among expatriate Arabs and has also been successfully exported to international folk dance groups all over the world. All dancers wear the traditional costume to embody the history of their culture and tell their ancestors stories.

== History ==
Historically, dance has always been an important part of the Arabic culture. Some examples of the various social dances enjoyed in the Arab world are Debke (Arabic: دبكة, also spelled Dabkeh), Raqs Baladi (Arabic: بلدي, romanized: baladī; relative-adjective "of town", "local", "rural", comparable to English "folk", with a lower-class connotation), and religious sacred dances.

In Spain and the Iberian Peninsula, the idea of exotic dancing existed throughout the Islamic era and sometimes included slavery. When the Umayyads conquered Spain, they sent Basque singers and dancers to Damascus and Egypt for training in the Middle Eastern style. These dancers came to be known as Al-Andalusian dancers. It is theorised that the fusion of the Al-Andalus style with the dances of the Spanish Gypsies led to the creation of flamenco.

The courtly pleasures of the Umayyad, Abbasid and Fatimid caliphs included belly dancing, soirée, and singing. Belly dancers and singers were sent from all parts of the vast empire to entertain.

During the French campaign in Egypt and Syria in 1798, Europeans were interested in the Arab world, folk dances and music of each country.

In the middle of the 19th century, the eastern side of the Arab world; Arabia, Egypt, the Levant and the Mesopotamia were collectively referred to as 'Al Sharq' or 'Mashreq'; meaning 'East'. The Middle East attracted European painters and writers described as Orientalists, who specialized in Oriental subjects; among the most prominent personalities are Jean-Léon Gérôme, Eugène Delacroix and Jean-Auguste-Dominique Ingres.

Arabic dance was performed in the United States in 1893 at the World's Columbian Exposition, which included an exhibition entitled "The streets of Cairo". The exhibition was attended by dancers from Egypt and several other Arab countries from the Middle East and North Africa, including Syria and Algeria. The term "belly dancing" is often credited to Sol Bloom, its entertainment director, but referred to the dance as danse du ventre, the name used by the French in Algeria. In his memoirs, Bloom states, "when the public learned that the literal translation was "belly dance", they delightedly concluded that it must be salacious and immoral...I had a gold mine."

== Types of dance ==
Arabs have their own diverse and rich music and dances which is part of their identity. There are a lot of Arab traditional dances as the Arab world is a vast area. Men are also as involved as women. Here are four kinds of traditional dances.

=== List of classic dances ===
These dances date from the antiquity and have not ceased to evolve in history and in time.

==== Belly dance ====
Belly dance also referred to as Egyptian dance (Arabic: رقص شرقي, romanized: Raqs sharqi) is an Egyptian expressive dance, which emphasizes complex movements of the torso. Many boys and girls in countries where belly dancing is popular will learn how to do it when they are young. The dance involves movement of many different parts of the body; usually in a circular way. Both women and men can belly dance.

==== Shamadan ====
Shamadan (Arabic: شمعدان) is a large candelabrum balanced on top of a dancer's head, in a tradition unique to Egyptian dance. This dance prop is historically used in the Egyptian wedding procession, or zeffah. The wedding procession traditionally occurs at night, winding its way through the streets of the neighborhood from the home of the bride's parents to her new home at the groom's house. This is the official moving of the bride and is led by a dancer, musicians and singers, followed by the wedding party and their friends and family.

==== Raqs Sharqi ====
Raqs Sharqi (Arabic: رقص شرقي) is the classical Egyptian style of oriental dance that developed during the first half of the 20th century. This dance is pre-Islamic and is an oral tradition which has changed over the centuries. Some people believe that it originated as a fertility or Goddess worshipping dance, and in North Africa it can still be used to help during childbirth.

==== Baladi ====
Baladi (Arabic: بلدي) means "of the country" and is a style of Egyptian folk dance from the early 20th century which is still very popular. Thus, ‘Egyptian Beledi’ means ‘of the country of Egypt’ It came about when farmers moved to the city and began dancing in small spaces. Egyptians have Baladi people, Baladi bread, Baladi rhythms, Baladi music and Baladi dance. It is a folk/social form of bellydance. It is more stationary than raqs sharqi, with little use of the arms, and the focus is on hip movements. Baladi dance has a 'heavy' feeling, with the dancer appearing relaxed and strongly connected to the ground. It is performed to baladi or folk music.

==== Almeh ====
Almeh (Arabic: عالمة, romanized: ʕálma IPA: [ˈʕælmæ]; the sublime dance in the past is ʕálme or ʕālme, plural عوالم ʕawālim Egyptian Arabic pronunciation: [ʕæˈwæːlem, -lɪm], from Arabic: ʻālima, from علم "to know, be learned") was the name of a class of female entertainers in Egypt, women educated to sing and recite classical poetry and to discourse wittily. unlike the ghawazy, the awalim performed only for women and for the high class in their homes.

==== Ouled Nail ====
Ouled Nail (Arabic: أولاد نايل) originated a style of music, sometimes known as Bou Saâda music after the town near their homeland. In belly dancing, the term refers to a style of dance originated by the Ouled Naïl, noted for their way of dancing. Which involves small, rapid foot movements paired with vigorous torso and hip movements.

==== Ghawazi ====
Ghawazi, Ghawazy (Arabic: غوازي) (also ghawazee) dancers of Egypt were a group of female traveling dancers. The Ghawazee perform solo or in small groups, unveiled for heterogenic audience, in the public streets, in festivals, in cafe houses and in the Upper Egypt mawalid (local Islamic ceremony), the term itself sometimes accompanied sexual-acts in the local culture and was sometimes used as an insult. Their dancing has little of elegance; its chief peculiarity being a very rapid vibrating motion of the hips, from side to side.

=== Folk dances ===
Those dances are performed during the civil celebrations or events as birth, death, wedding or a social ascent and sometimes during religious festivals.

==== Dabke ====
Dabke (Arabic: دبكة), is a Levantine folk dance event forming part of the shared sociocultural landscape of Jordan, Palestine, Lebanon and Syria. Twice, Dabke was made into a fixed canon of movement patterns and steps which, through repeated execution, served to consolidate behavioral norms and cultural meanings.

==== Deheyeh ====
Deheyeh (Arabic: الدحية), Is a Bedouin dance practiced in Palestine, Jordan, northern Saudi Arabia, some of the Gulf states, the Syrian desert. It was practiced before the wars to stir up enthusiasm among the members of the tribe, and at the end of the battles in ancient times describe the battle and the tournaments, but now it is practiced on occasions such as weddings, holidays and other celebrations.

=== Popular dances ===
Popular dances involve all forms artistic expressions of a people.

==== Khaleegy ====
Khaleegy (Arabic: خليجي) is a dance performed in the countries of the Arabian Peninsula. A long "Thawb" is worn which the dancer holds up in front. There is a step with it, but the main feature is the hair tossing as the head swings from side to side. The name of the dance literally means "gulf" in Arabic and it is danced by local women in weddings and other social events. Khaleegy is a joyful, lively, expressive, gestural and delicate dance performed in events involving happiness and celebration (like weddings). Women dance in complicity and it is often started with one of them standing alone in the dance floor to begin the dance, and then the others join her. The main body parts involved in the dance are the hands, the head and the "Thawb" itself. The hair, apart from the "Thawb" is the main element used to dance Khaleegy: women let their long hair "dance" moving it from side to side, back and forth, in circle and making other figures. Recently it has become very popular among belly dancers.

The Khaleegy dance is most commonly performed to a hypnotic 2/4 rhythm with two heavy beats and a pause, called the Saudi, khaliji, or adany rhythm (from Yemen). There is not one khaliji rhythm but hundreds, as this dance represents many countries of the Gulf area.

==== Ardah ====
Ardah (Arabic: العرضة, romanized: al-‘arḍah) is a type of folkloric dance in Arabia. The dance is performed with two rows of men opposite of one another, each of whom may or may not be wielding a sword or cane, and is accompanied by drums and spoken poetry. In the Emirates, the local version is called the ayyalah.

The term 'Ardah' is thought to derive from the Arabic verb ard meaning 'to show' or 'to parade'. It was so named because its purpose was to publicly display the fighting strength of a tribe and boost morale before an armed engagement. Although there are regional variations of the particular rendition of ardah, the purpose it serves is nearly identical throughout the Arabian Peninsula.

==== Hagallah ====
Hagallah (Arabic: هجاله) is a folkloric dance of celebration known as the hagallah is performed by the settled Bedouin (bedu) of Mersa Matruh in Western Egypt and is often performed during the date harvest, which is the wedding season in that area. Hagallah is also known in areas of neighbouring Libya and is related to kaf (clapping) dances in other regions of the Middle East., hagallah is performed by the bedouin of western Egypt. It has been described as a wedding dance and also as a girl's coming-of-age dance.

==== Schikhatt ====
Schikhatt (Arabic: شيخات): in Classical Arabic, the word sheikha (Arabic: شيخة) is the feminine of sheikh: a person with knowledge, experience, wisdom. In Maghrebi (Moroccan Arabic), "sheikha" limits its meaning to specify a woman with carnal knowledge extensive enough to teach others. It is an erotic women-only dance, originally performed for the bride before her wedding, with the idea of teaching her how she would be expected to move in the marriage bed.

==== Guedra ====
Guedra (Arabic: كدرة) is a dance from the desert region of Morocco's south west, performed to induce an altered state of consciousness, with a solo performer beginning the dance with hand movements, then swinging the head and torso until a trance state is reached. Guedra dancers are single or divorced women. Sometimes men from the audience will enquire with a view to marriage.

==== Yowlah ====
Yowlah (Arabic: اليولة) or ayyalah is traditional dance in the United Arab Emirates. It involves spinning and throwing a rifle dummy made entirely of wood and metal plating.

=== Sacred dances ===
Those sacred dances are related to the dominant religion of the Arab world which is Islam. They are particularly linked to Sufism which is the heart of the Islamic tradition inaugurated by the Prophet Muhammad.

==== Tanoura ====
Tanoura (Arabic: التنورة) Is an Egyptian folk dance with obvious Sufi origins, which today became an important ritual of the celebration rituals performed on many occasions. The dance is a rhythmic dance performed collectively by circular movements, which stems from the mystical Islamic sense of philosophical basis. It sees that the movement in the universe starts from a point and ends at the same point and therefore reflects this concept in their dance. Their movements come as if they are drawing halos, drenched in space. The word tanoura or tannoura refers to the colorful skirt worn by the whirler, with a color representing each Sufi order.

==== Zar ====
Zār (Arabic: زار) is a dance performed to drive away evil spirits. It originated in the Sudan but is also popular among women in Egypt.

== Gallery ==
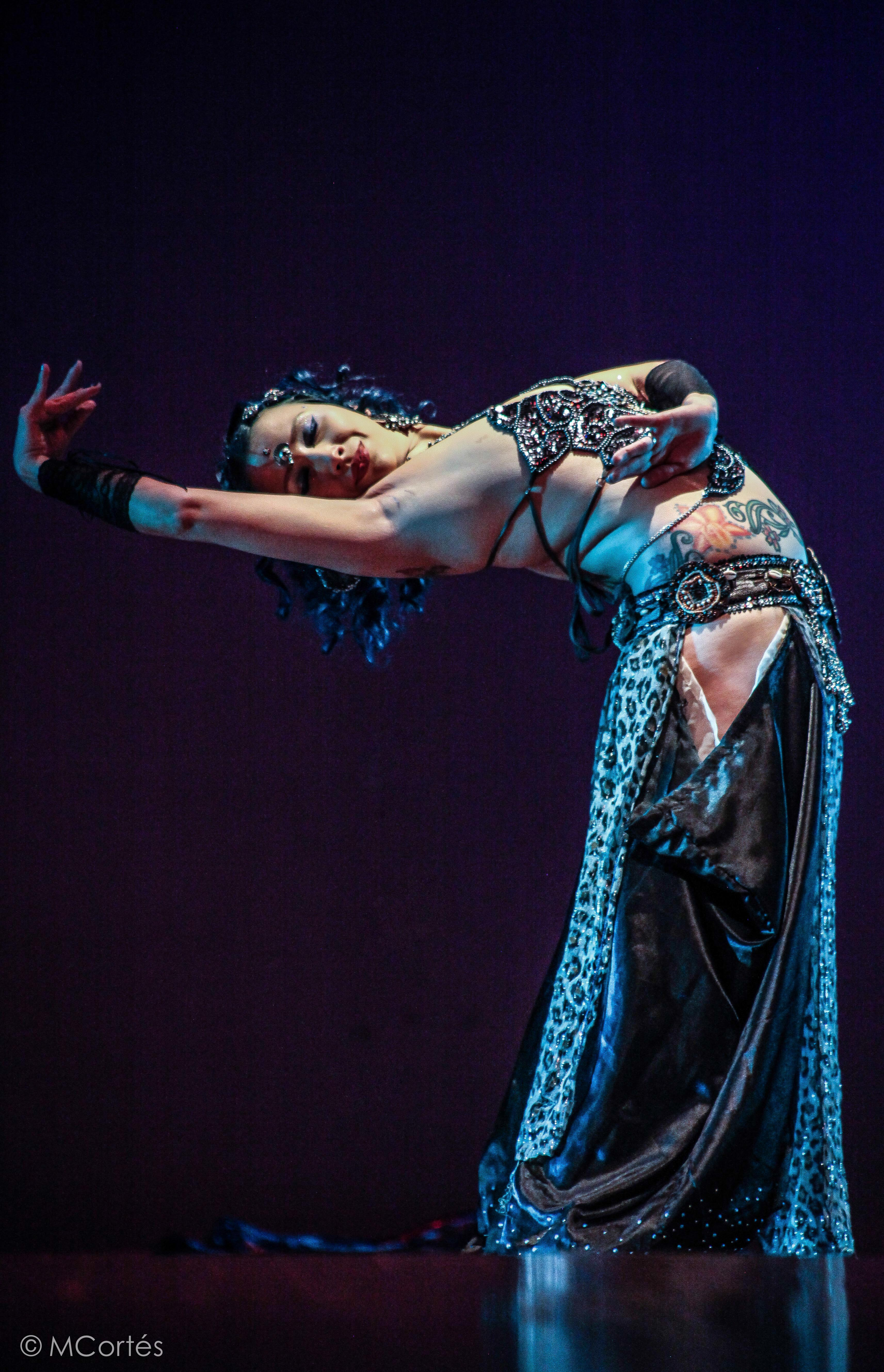

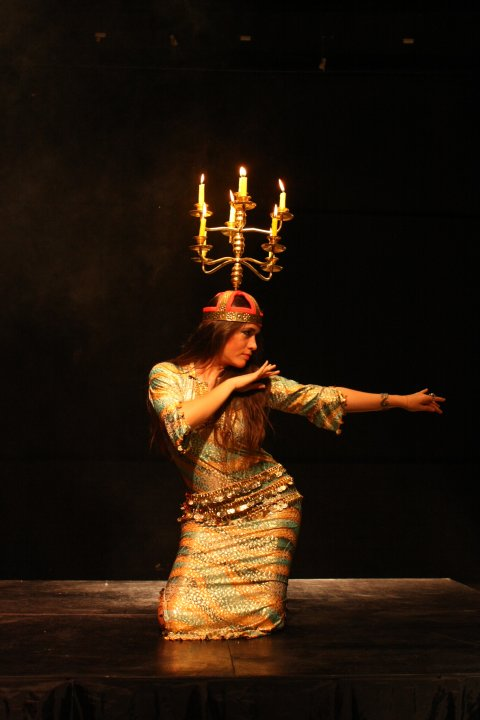

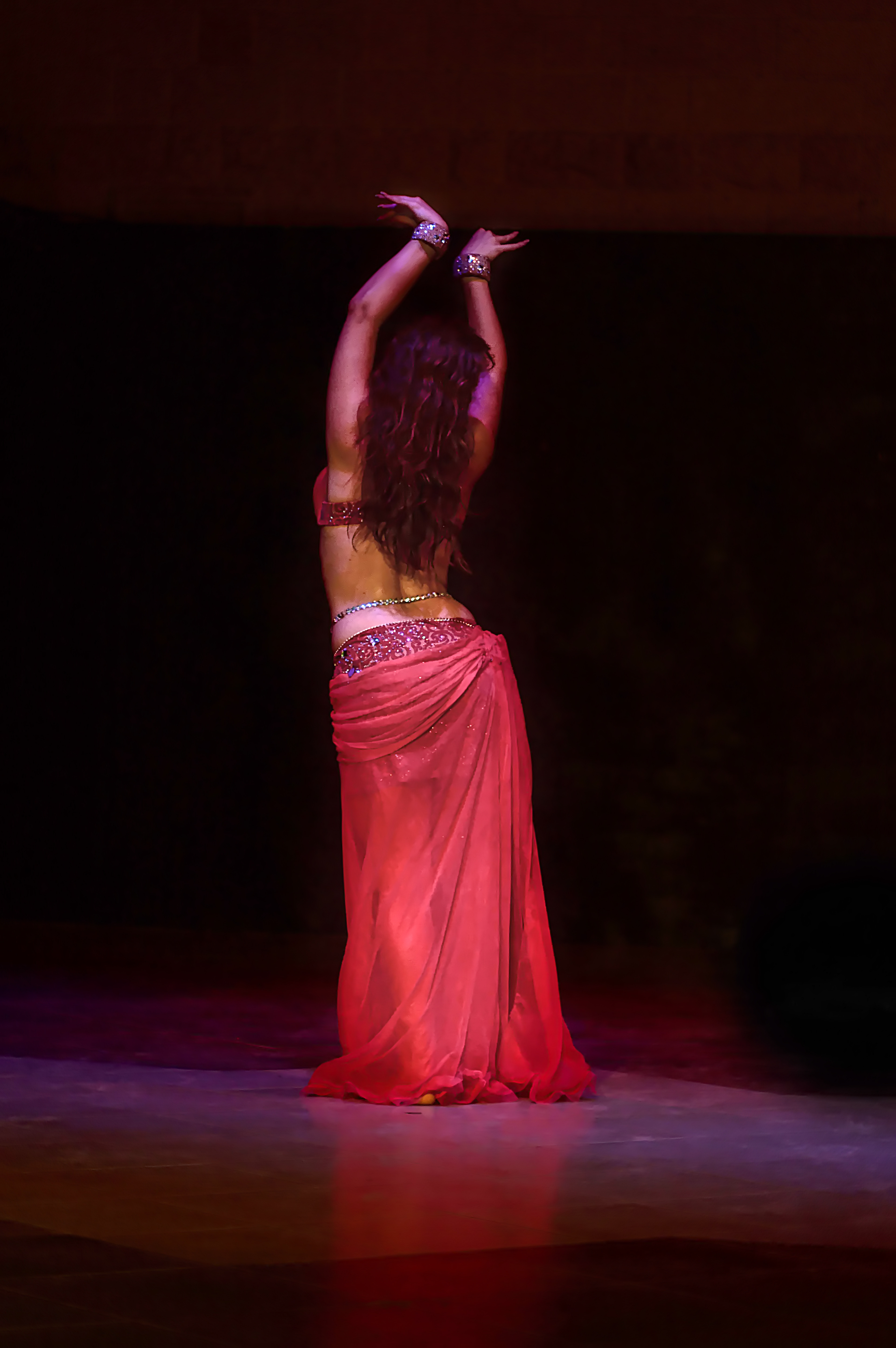

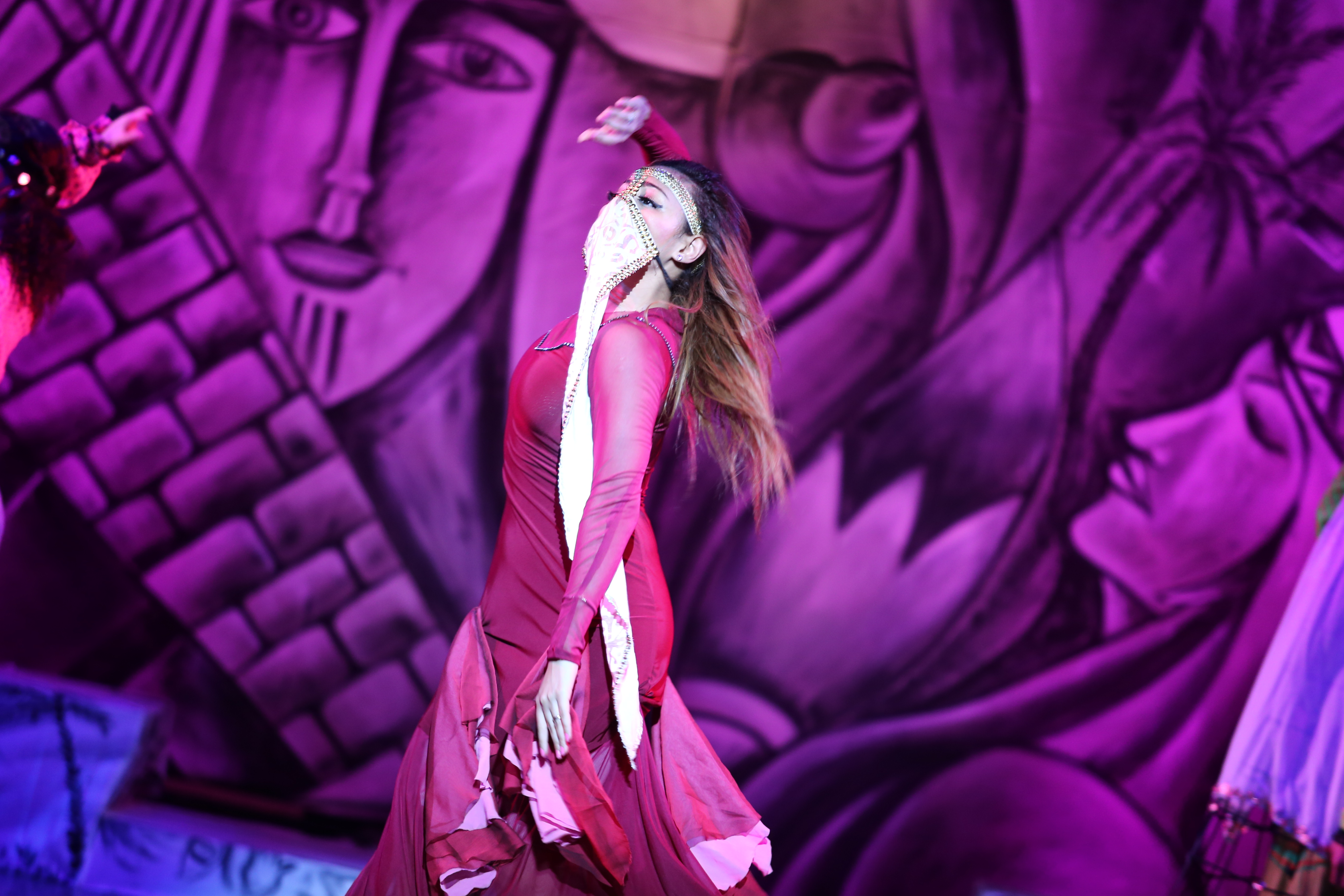

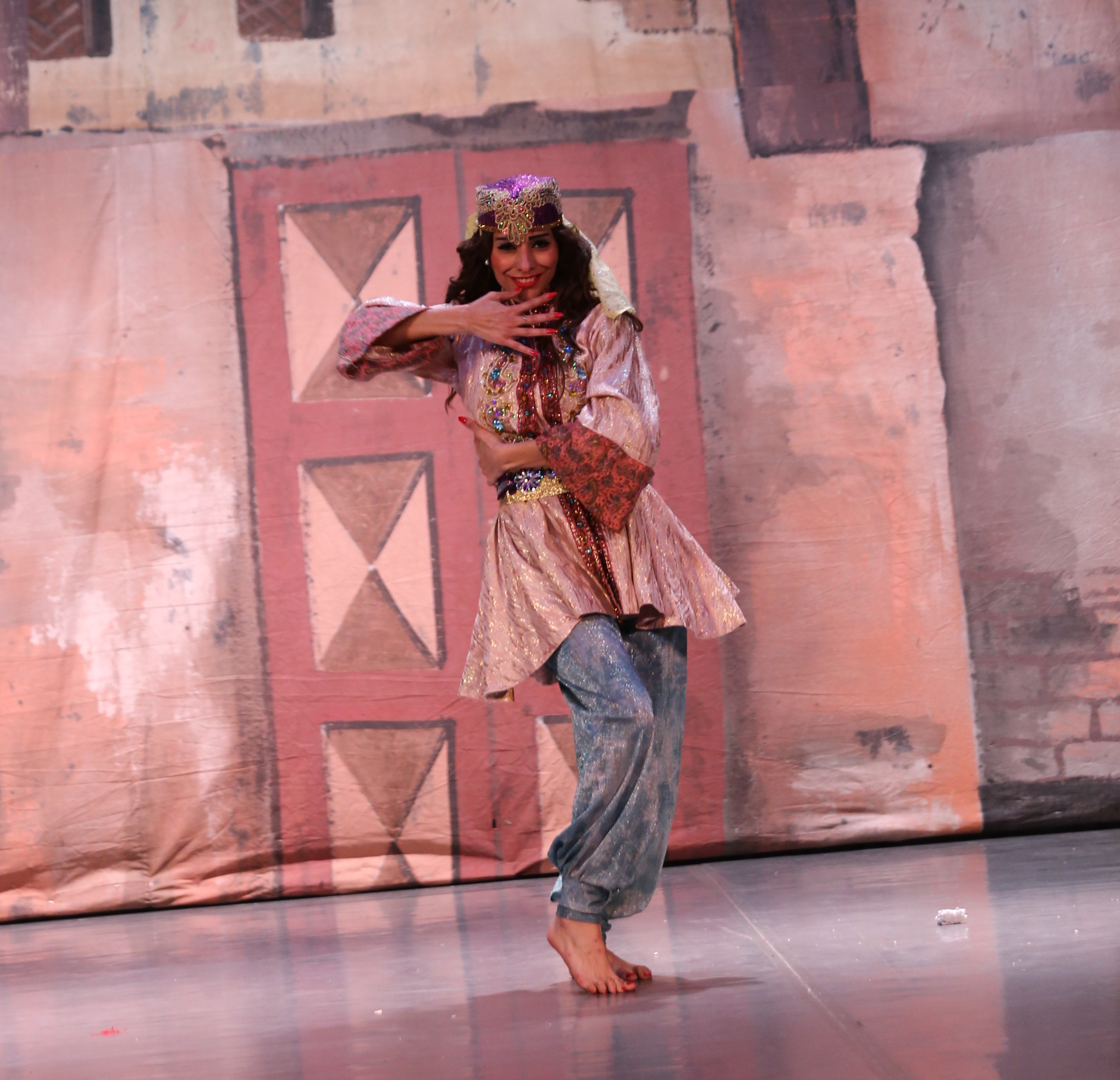

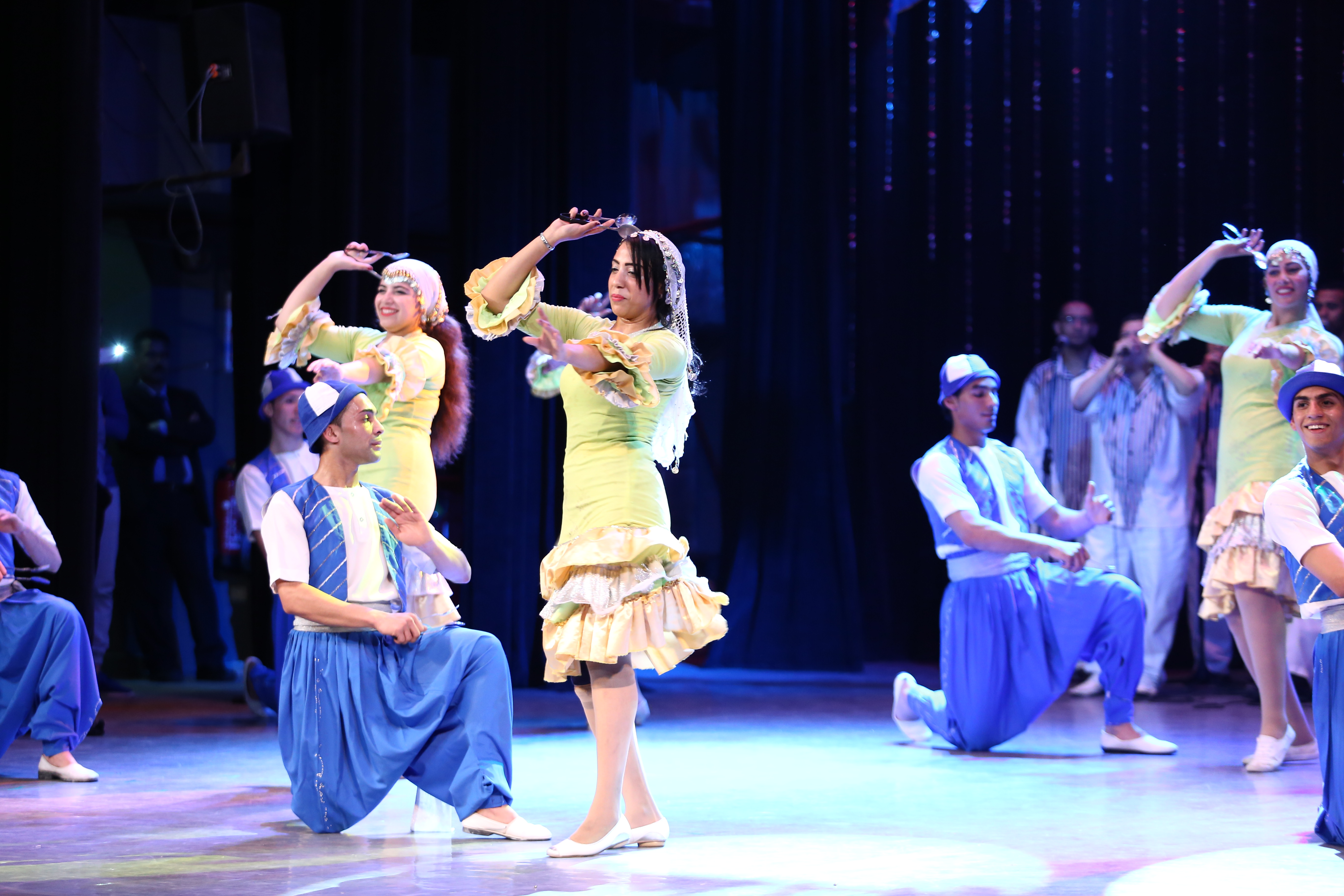

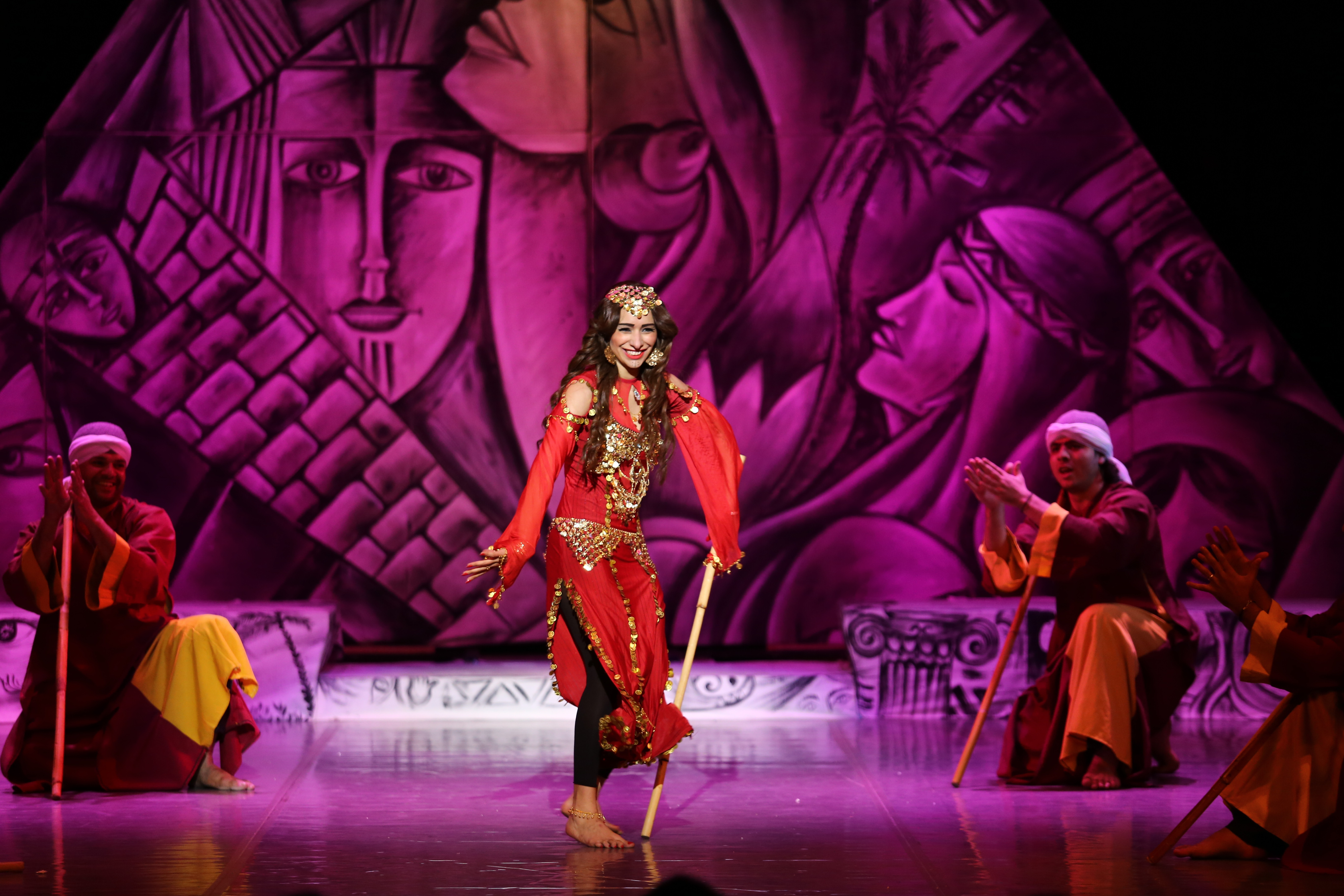

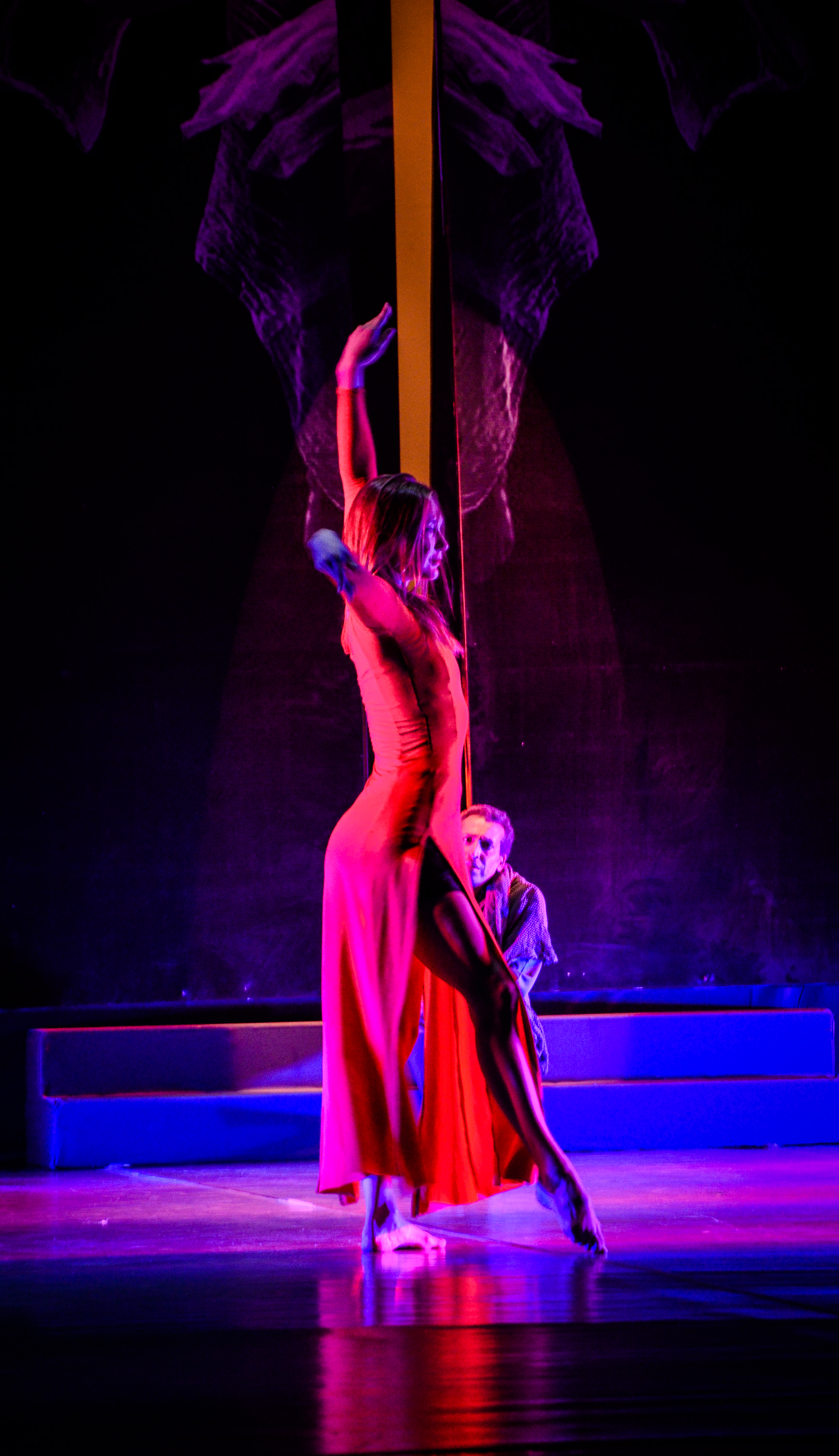

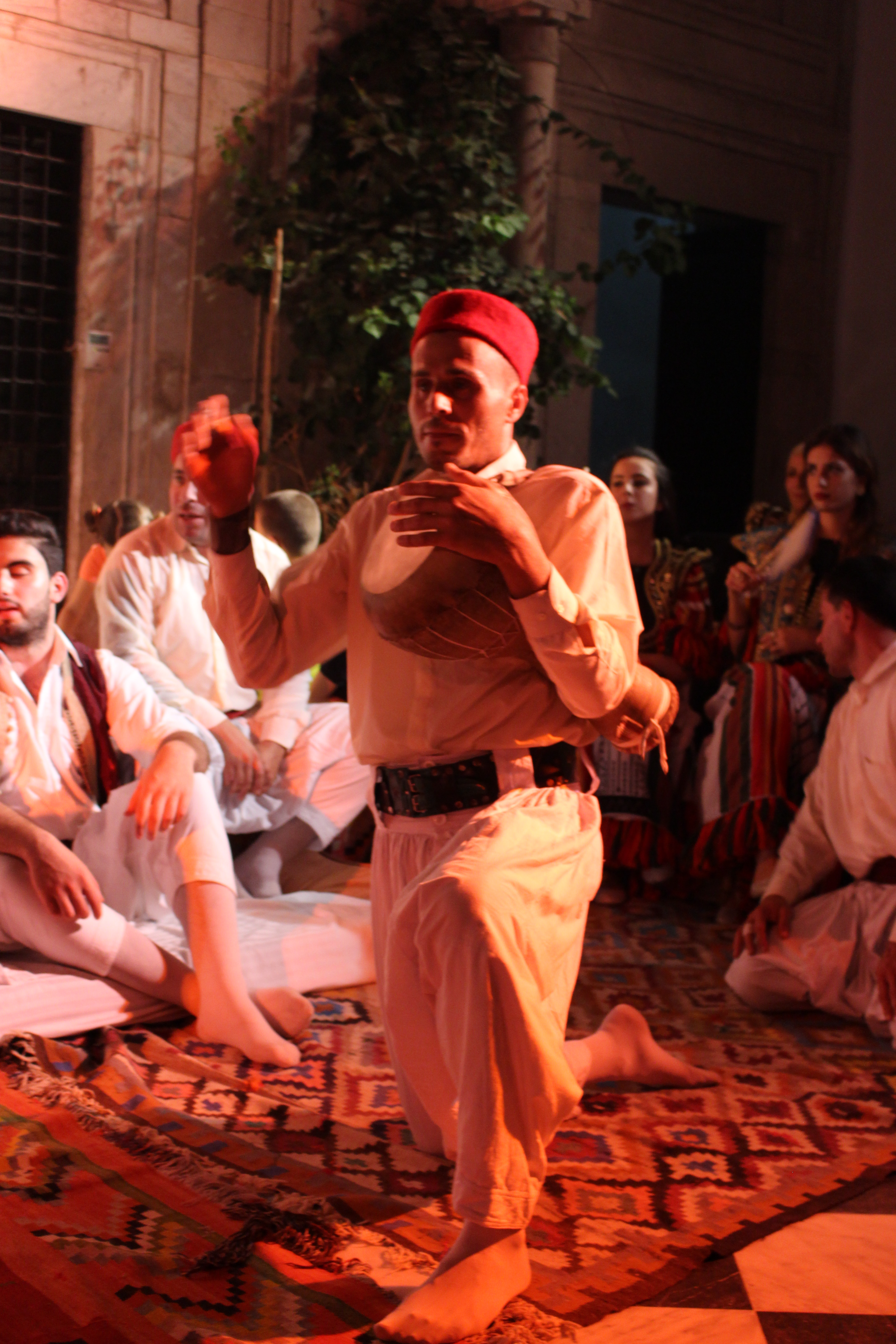

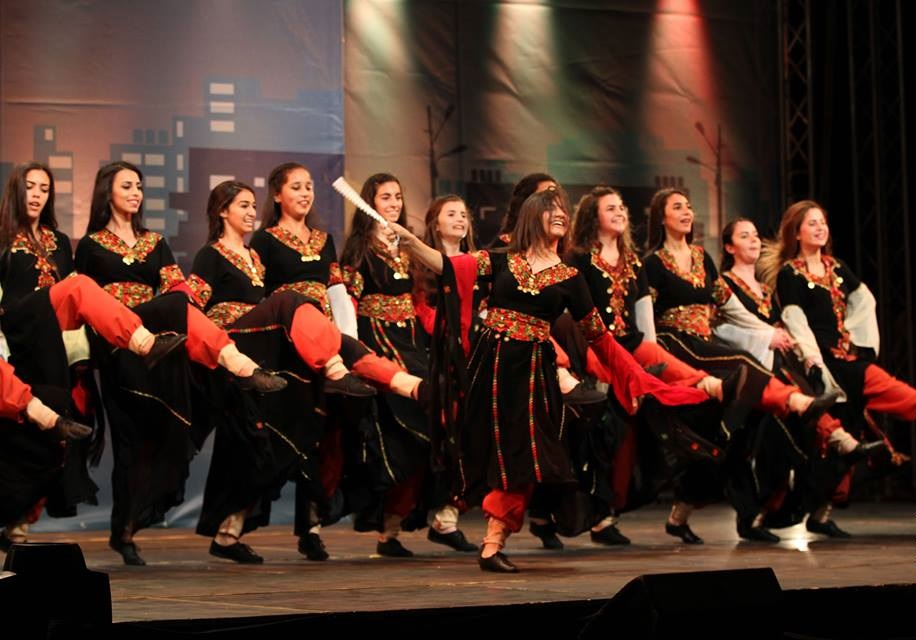

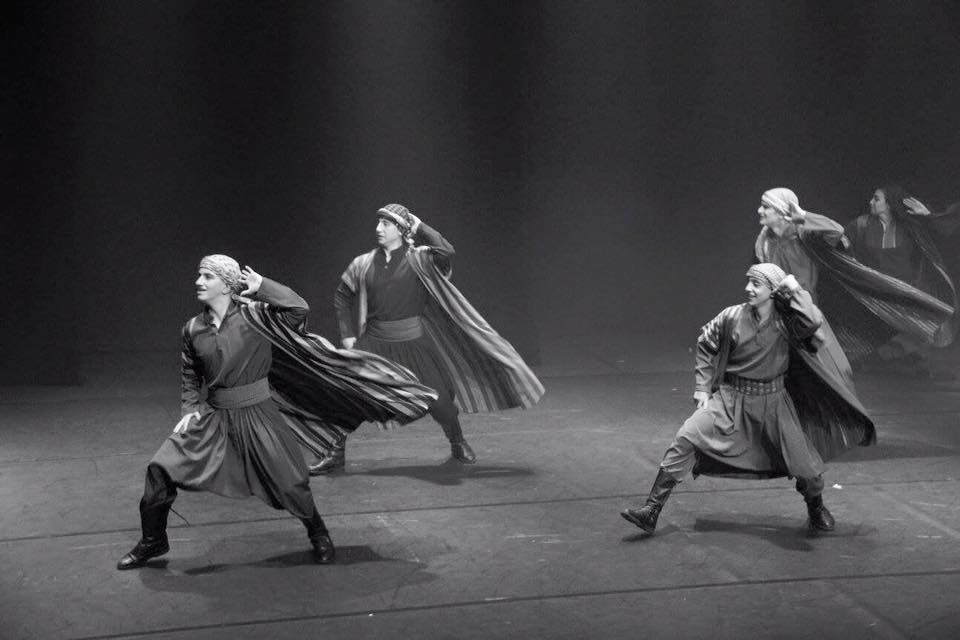

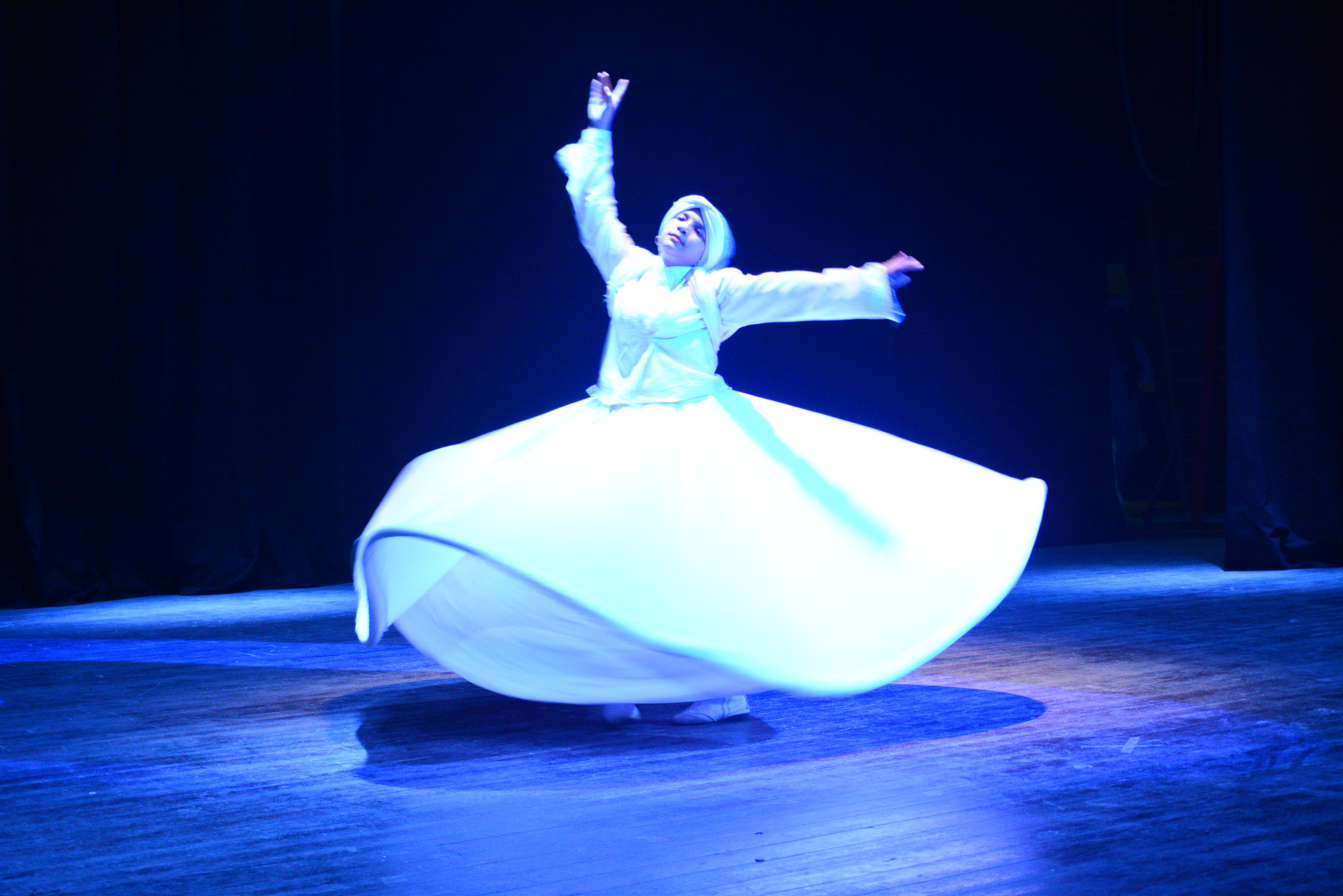

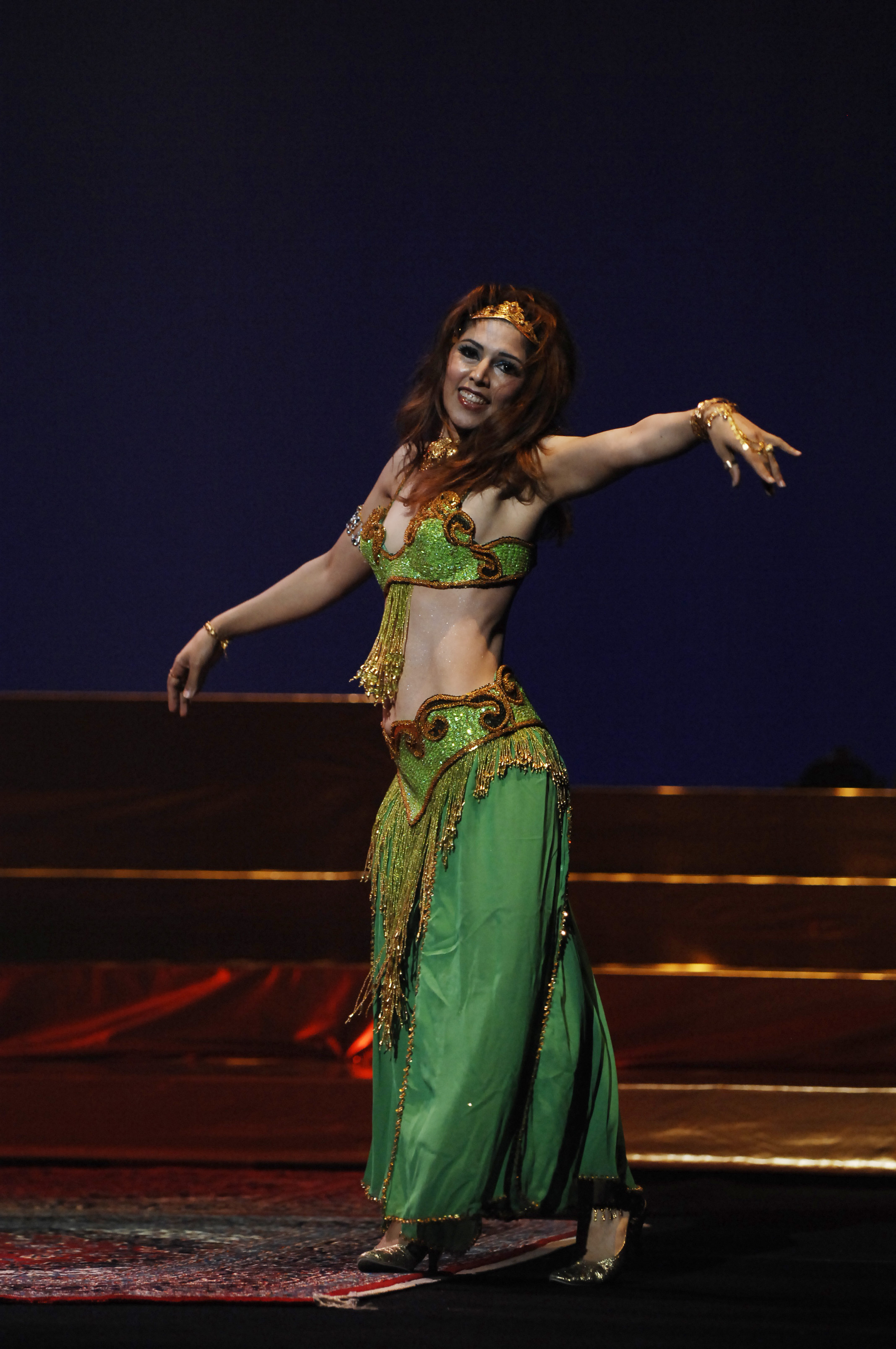

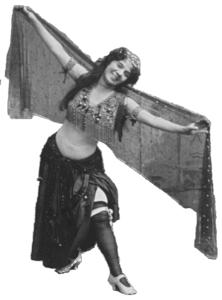

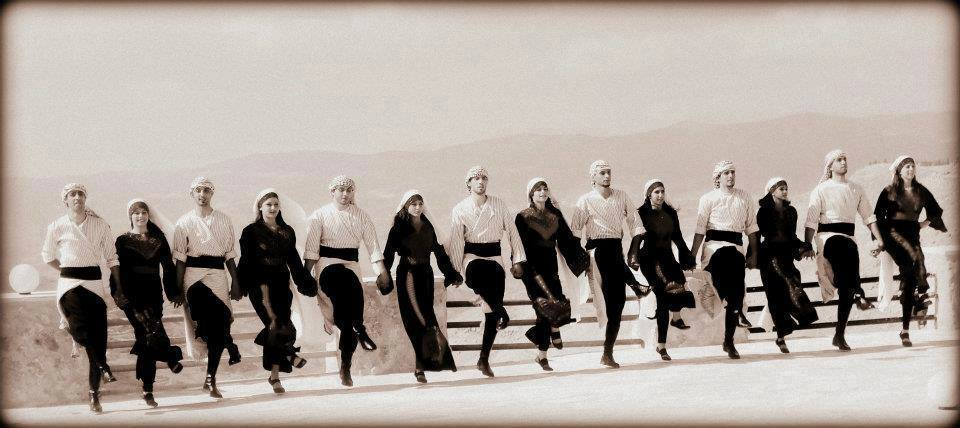

== See also ==
- Middle Eastern dance
- M'alayah
