= Hosa =

HOSA may mean:

- HOSA (organization), HOSA—Future Health Professionals (formerly the Health Occupations Students of America)
- Hydroxylamine-O-sulfonic acid, chemical
- Hosa (folk tradition)
- Hosa Ice Hockey Team
- Chief Little Raven (c. 1810–1889), also known as "Hosa" (Young Crow), American Indian chief of the Southern Arapaho
