= Journey Down The Nile =

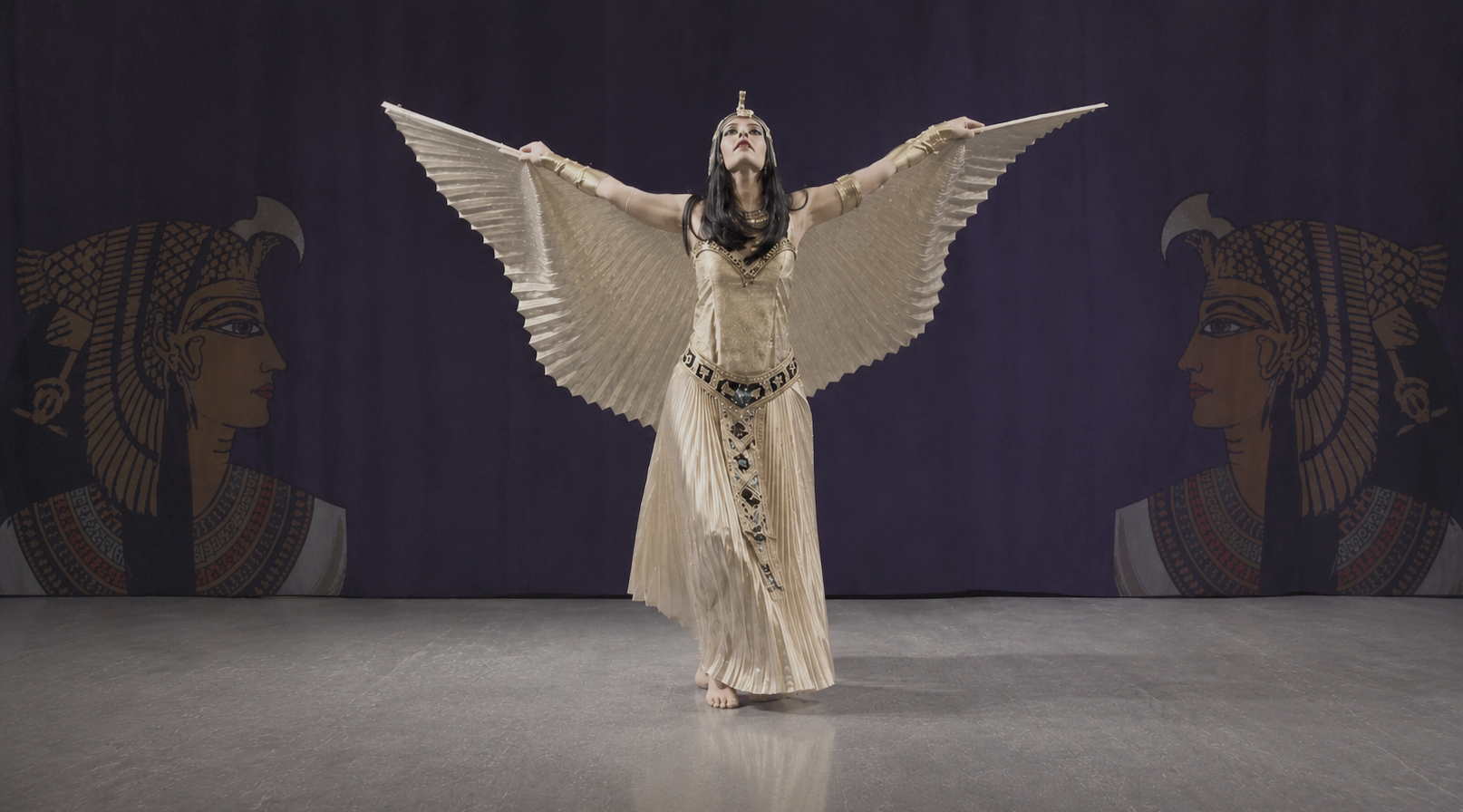
The Cleopatra VII segment of Journey Down the Nile.

Journey Down the Nile is an Egyptian educational cultural program that incorporates film and dance related to Egyptian history, regional traditions, and Egyptian art.

The program is organized into five segments: Cleopatra VII Philopator, Sa'idi cane, raqs al-sharqi, raqs al-saïf, and ancient shamadan. Documentary films accompany each segment.

A segment of the program centers on Cleopatra VII Philopator and has been discussed in connection with modern cultural depictions of the Macedonian queen.
