= Wedding traditions in Iraq =

Wedding traditions in Iraq encompass a variety of cultural norms that dictate the rituals of wedding ceremonies within Iraqi society. This aspect of Iraqi life also mirrors the relationships between individuals and the methods they employ to establish enduring social connections.

== Overview ==
Specifically, most marriages are traditionally arranged by parents without the bride and groom having met beforehand, although there are cases where a boy might notice a girl, and the boy's mother intervenes. Then, the girl's family is contacted to propose marriage, presenting her family and the boy to spark the curiosity of the girl's family. Subsequently, the girl's family will contact the boy's family and request that the groom come with his mother. Some families might even allow the bride and groom to get to know each other better before the wedding, deciding on the next steps accordingly. However, this entire process might not take place in some rural areas where the bride and groom could even be cousins.

=== Mashaiya ===
The next step after the initial arrangements is called "Mashaiya", during which the groom’s family brings the eldest person from the family along with a number of male relatives and friends. The eldest person from the groom’s family then asks the bride’s father for her hand in marriage, followed by the groom’s father making the request on behalf of his son. Desserts are usually served, and this formality typically takes a short time.

Following this, the engagement party takes place, where the bride and groom exchange rings. This party is organized by the bride’s family and attended by close relatives of both parties. If the venue is too small, only women might participate in the celebration.

=== Formalizing the marriage ===
Then, the couple is supposed to marry legally in the presence of an authority, although they might not live together immediately afterward. In this phase, the man agrees to provide financial support or material compensation to the wife in the event of divorce or death. This arrangement usually takes place at a court, but some families might invite the judge to the bride’s home for a traditional ceremony. For Sunnis, the bride wears a white dress or Jallabiya, and seven cups filled with white foods such as sugar, yogurt, cream, and honey, along with the Quran and a mirror, are placed in front of her. The judge then asks the bride if she agrees to the marriage through a series of traditional questions, repeating them three times before receiving her answer. The groom is then asked the same question only once.

For Shias, the bride wears a white dress, and seven plates are placed in front of her with various spices arranged beautifully. A Shia cleric, rather than a judge, conducts the ceremony. During this, two women hold a strip of cloth over the bride while a third sprinkles sugar on it, and the bride keeps her feet in a basin of water with dried flowers.

=== Nishan and Henna ===
Following this ceremony is the "Nishan" party, which is another celebration organized by the bride’s family at their home or at a venue. During this party, the groom’s family gives the bride jewelry, either gold or diamonds, depending on their financial means, and the groom helps her adjust the jewelry.

Before the wedding day, separate parties are held at both the groom’s and the bride’s homes, where they invite their close ones, and "henna" is applied to the guests' hands. The Henna party is a special ritual that adds charm to the wedding, which traditionally lasts for seven days. During this party, the groom’s family gives the bride an expensive gift called "Sanchaq", and the bride’s hands and feet are painted with henna (henna ceremony).

Then comes the actual wedding celebration, which can vary in scale. Some families might hold a party with a band at the bride’s house, while others might prefer a venue.

These traditions can, of course, vary depending on the environment (urban, rural), financial means, and location. In Mosul, for example, the wedding party is held on the fourth day after the ceremony. It is usually held at the groom’s parents' house, with invitations coming only from the bride's side, and it is expected that women will bring gifts for the newlyweds. Only the bride typically participates in this party, with the groom waiting in a separate room until all the guests have left. The bride wears a party dress, sometimes multiple outfits, or starts the party in the white dress and changes outfits during the event.

Currently, despite the difficult situation in the region, weddings still take place, albeit with slight adjustments to the timing of the ceremonies. Instead of an evening celebration, families might now hold the event at noon to ensure the safety of their guests. Most newlyweds are no longer accustomed to spending their wedding night in Baghdad’s hotels but might opt for staying at home or traveling to Kurdistan, for example.

== See also ==
- Arab wedding
- Hosa (folk tradition)
