= Kurdish dance =

Group of traditional dances among Kurds

Kurdish dances (Kurdish: Govend, Dîlan, Dawet, Helperkê, Şayî; دیلان, گۆڤەند, داوەت, ھەڵپەڕکێ, شایی) are a group of traditional dances among Kurds. It is a form of a circle dance, with a single or a couple of figure dancers often added to the geometrical center of the dancing circle. At times musicians playing on a drum or a double reed wind instrument known as a zurna, accompany the dancers. Often there are dancers twirling handkerchiefs who lead the half-circled group of dancers. The dancers, generally women, but also, on occasions, men, wear traditional Kurdish clothes. The Kurds dance on several occasions such as Kurdish festivals, birthdays, New Years, Newroz, marriage, and other ceremonies and the dances have several names which often relate to local names and traditions. Its noteworthy that these folkloric dances are typically mixed-gender which distinguishes the Kurds from other neighbouring Muslim populations. On March 3, 2023, Iranian police shut down a sports centre over mixed-gender Kurdish dances.

== Types and styles ==
Kurdish dances are each performed with a specific melody and style, some of which are named as follows:

- Şêxanî
- Bagiyê
- Şamîranê
- Til Mercan
- Lorke
- Evdîşo
- Koçerî
- Rewendî
- Bêriyokê
- Milanê
- Axişte (Serhed Region)
- Dim Dime (Urmia to Duhok)
- Akmelî
- Lo Mîro
- Baso
- Lê Gulê
- Hicrokê
- Navçeliyê
- Çoxo
- Eyşokê
- Mîrkut
- Geliyê Başkala (Suka Hewlêrê)
- Zêrînê
- Reyhanî
- Sûrçiyanî
- Herkiyanî
- Hey Borî
- Welato
- Emer Axayo
- Siyarkî (Swarkî)
- Hoy Narê
- Hey Dîlan
- Meraan Axa
- Kurtê
- Helize
- Nalbendan
- Sê pê
- Royne
- Daxe
- Geryan
- Çepî
- Sê car

== See also ==
- Middle Eastern dance
- Kurdish traditional clothing
- Armenian dance
- Assyrian folk dance
- Dabke (a form of Arabic dance)
- Syrtos (Greek)
- Turkish dance
