= Middle Eastern dance =

Traditional dancing styles of Middle Eastern ethnic groups

Middle Eastern dance, sometimes called oriental dance, comprises a variety of dancing styles historically associated with ethnic groups in the Middle East. It may include influences from other parts of the world, such as Western dance, and may also be present in regions that have overlapping or shared ethnic or cultural demographics with the Middle East (namely North Africa, which is part of the Arab world) per se. The Middle East is generally understood as a region that comprises the majority of West Asia, albeit including Egypt and excluding the Caucasus.

== Tentative list ==
=== Arab ===
Middle Eastern Arab dance encompasses historical dancing styles among Arabs in the Arabian Peninsula and the Levant, as well as Iraq and Egypt. It includes the following: ardah, baladi, belly dancing, dabke, deheyeh, Fann at-Tanbura, hosa, khaleegy, mizmar, raqs sharqi, shamadan, tahtib, tanoura, and yowlah.

=== Armenian ===
The Armenians are an ethnic group who, while indigenous to the Armenian highlands, have historically inhabited and culturally impacted parts of modern-day Turkey, Lebanon, and Iran, among other countries. Consequently, Armenian dance has been present in the Middle East for centuries, including: berd, kochari, shalakho, tamzara, and yarkhushta.

=== Assyrian ===
Assyrian folk dance: khigga.

=== Cypriot ===
See: Greek Cypriot dance and Turkish Cypriot dance.

=== Kurdish ===
Kurdish dance: dilan.

=== Persian ===
A highly stylized, graceful form that evolved from 19th century Qajar court dances. It emphasizes fluid upper body movements, intricate hand and finger work and expressive facial gestures. Modern versions often incorporate elements of ballet.

Iranian dance: Classical Persian dance.

=== Turkish ===
Turkish dance is a diverse art form shaped by Central Asian roots, Anatolian history, Islamic influence, and the expansion of the Ottoman Empire. It ranges from highly spiritual rituals to high energy regional folk dances.

Turkish dance: Çiftetelli, halay.

=== Jewish ===
Jewish dance: Hora, Tza'ad Teimani, Israeli folk dance

== See also ==
- Sufi whirling, among Muslim practitioners of Sufism
- Zaffa, an Egyptian wedding march
