= Samoon =

Type of bread

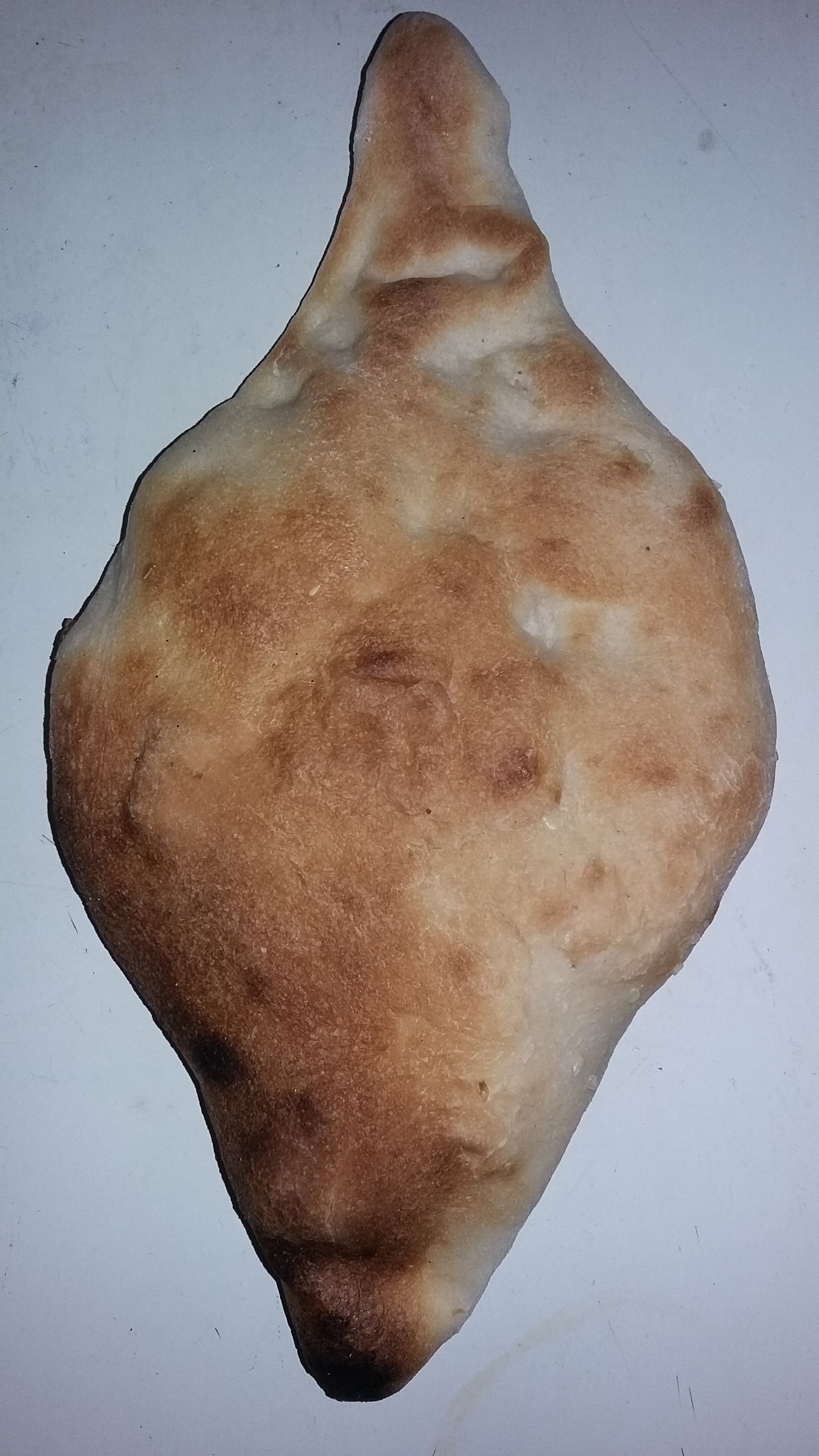
- Type: Bread
- Place of origin: Iraq
- Region or state: Iraq, Middle East
- Main ingredients: Dough

Samoon (Arabic: صمون) is a type of yeast bread that is consumed mainly in Iraq. It is baked in traditional stone ovens. This bread is one of the most widespread breads in Iraq, along with khubz. It is usually served with a variety of foods such as hummus, kebab, and shawarma. It is one of the most popular breads used in Iraq and across the Levant and variants can be found in Syria and Lebanon. It can be also found in other Middle Eastern and European countries. A key differentiator in most samoon is the use of live-culture yogurt as a leavener. Otherwise, the process of making it is relatively similar to pita, as it made from flour, yeast, water, and sometimes a pinch of salt. After kneading, the dough is left to rest before being shaped into its characteristic diamond form. It is then baked in a high-temperature brick oven, resulting in a crunchy crust and a soft, steaming interior.

== Etymology ==
The term samoon is believed to originate from an Armenian word, which itself is rooted in the Greek term for bread. The modern diamond shape of samoon is thought to have been developed by Iraqi bakers in the early 20th century.

== See also ==
- Khubz al-ʾAbbas
- Iraqi cuisine
- Culture of Iraq
