= M'alayah =

Dance in East Africa and Eastern Arabia

The M'alayah (Arabic: معلايه or معلاية / ALA-LC: ma‘alāyah) is a popular Arab dancing art that is performed at weddings. It originates in northern Oman, as well as the northeast United Arab Emirates. The M'alayah dance is based on rapid movements of the hips and buttocks, the dance is usually harmonised with local popular folk songs. It is the precursor of Belly dancing.

== See also ==
- Belly dance
- Makossa
- Mapouka
