= Khubz al-ʾAbbas =

Iraqi flatbread

Khubz al-‘Abbās
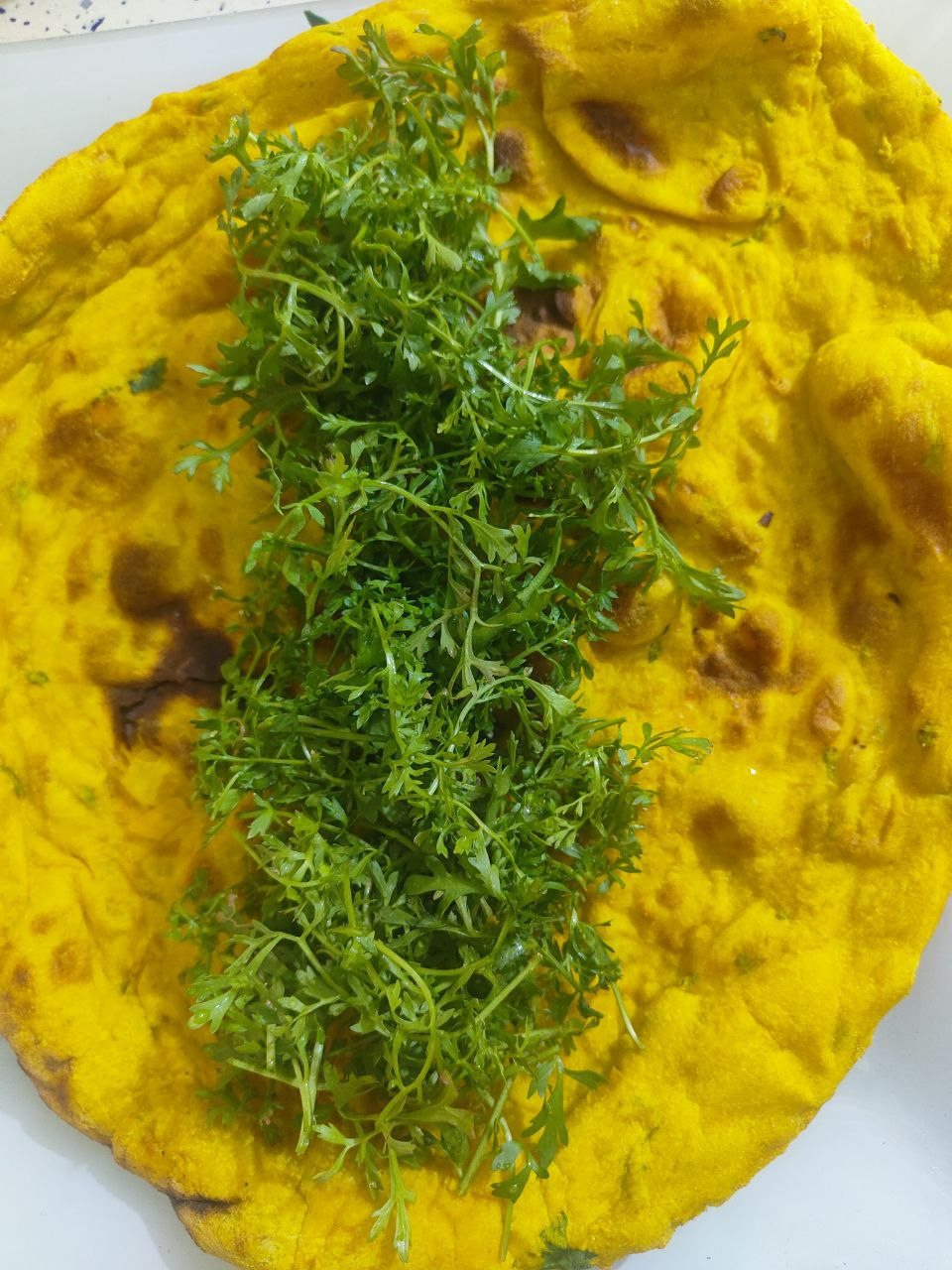
- Place of origin: Iraq
- Region or state: Lower Mesopotamia
- Associated cuisine: Iraqi cuisine

Khubz al-ʾAbbas (Arabic: خبز العباس, lit. 'bread of Abbas,') is a type of flatbread originating in southern Iraq. It is commonly offered as an act of charity during religious ceremonies, and various occasions of celebration or mourning. Its namesake is a reference to Abbas ibn Ali, also known by the kunya Abu al-Fadl (Arabic: أَبو الْفَضْل, lit. 'father of virtue'). The khubz is baked similarly to common bread, but is often served with added vegetables such as celery, parsley, mint, basil leaves, or garden cress. It may also be prepared with meat, cheese, vegetables, and onion.

The name gained popularity on social media through a viral Iraqi video in September 2024, featuring the hosa refrain, "Don't go too far, we'll bake you like khubz al-'Abbas." The phrase refers to the slap of the palm, a key part of the bread’s preparation method.

== See also ==
- Abbas ibn Ali
- Samoon
- Hosa (folk tradition)
