= Nadba =

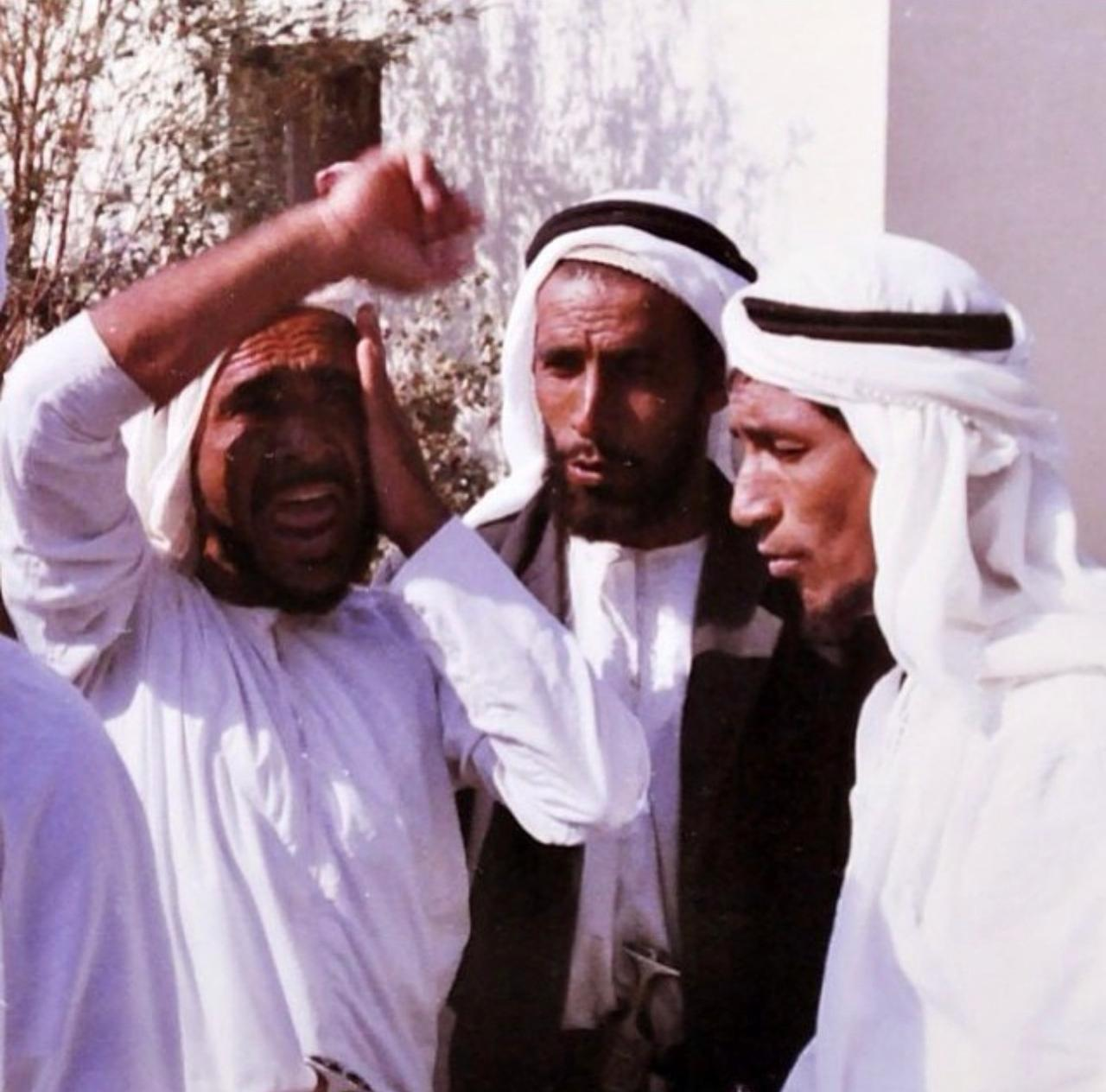
- Tribesmen performed Nadba.
- Native name: الندبة
- Genre: Cultural ceremonial
- Origin: Arabian Peninsula, United Arab Emirates Oman

The Nadba (Arabic: الندبه) is a cultural ceremonial battle cry native to the Shihuh, an Arab tribe that inhabits Ruus Al Jibal (Musandam Peninsula) in eastern Arabia. It is a famous cultural dance in the United Arab Emirates and the Sultanate of Oman. Although a battle cry, its use is not restricted during time of combat but today is commonly performed in ceremonies, weddings, feasts, and to honor guests.

It is performed by a group of tribesmen, who usually pick a leader (called the Nadeeb - Arabic: النديب) to lead the battle cry. The battle cry is performed by the leader raising his left arm across his chest to his mouth and his right arm bent above and behind his head, then straightening and bending the raised hand as he howls in an ascending and descending scale in Arabic to the lyrics of "Al Shehhi Al Mayhob" while the surrounding tribesmen, who form a circle around the leader (called Kabkub - Arabic: كبكوب), chant to the lyrics of "Ho..Ho..Ho" (shortened word of Allahu). The members performing the ceremony are call Ridida (Arabic: الرديدة).

== See also ==
- Culture of the United Arab Emirates
- Video of the Nadba on YouTube
