= Yowlah =

Traditional group dance of the United Arab Emirates and Oman

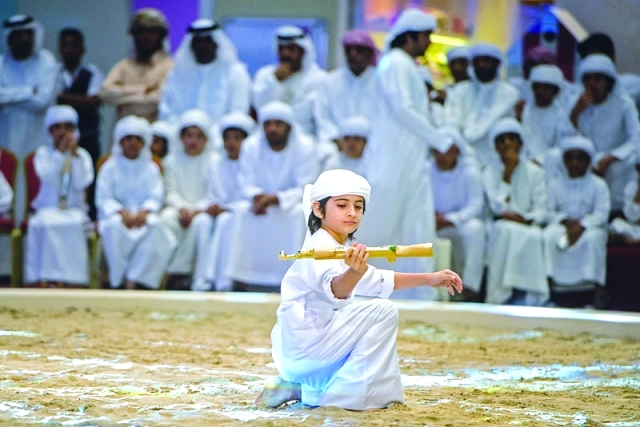
An Emirati child performing Yowlah.

The yowlah /ˈjaʊlə/ (Arabic: اليولة, al-yawlah, or العيالة, al-ʿayyalah or al-ʿiyyalah), is a weapon dance of the United Arab Emirates and Oman, traditionally performed during weddings, celebrations, and other events. The dance is accompanied by traditional music (drums and other instruments), and men and women are represented in separate groups of dancers. The yowlah originated as a Bedouin war dance where men would spin rifles after victory in a battle. There is also a variation from the standard yowlah known as the razfah (Arabic: الرزفة al-razfah, الرزفة العيالة al-razfat al-ʿayyalah, or العيالة أهل البحر al-ʿayyalat ʾahl al-baḥr); and the ardah is sometimes considered a form of the yowlah (as العرضة العيالة al-ʿarḍat al-ʿayyalah).

== Dance routine ==
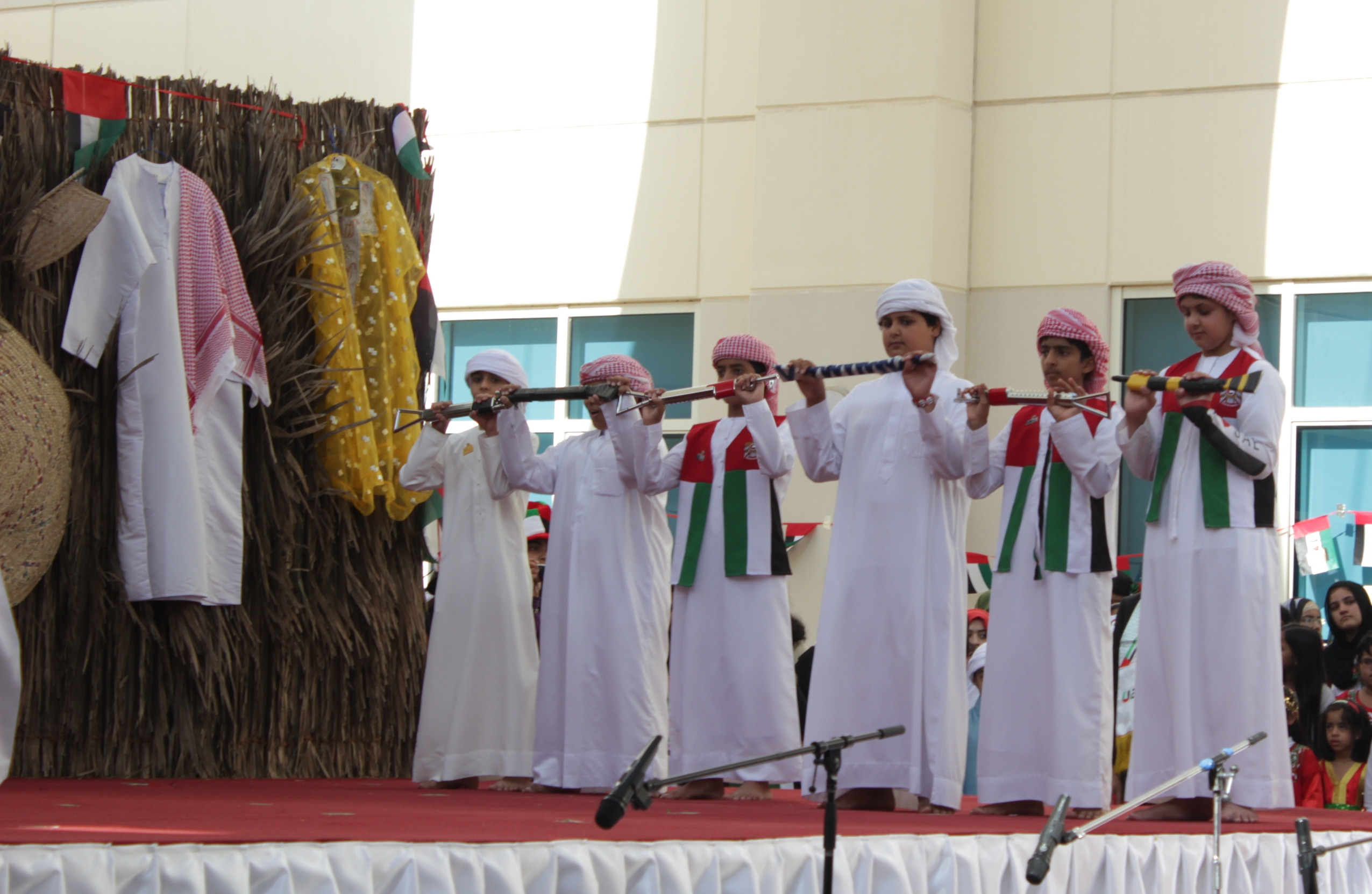
The yowlah.

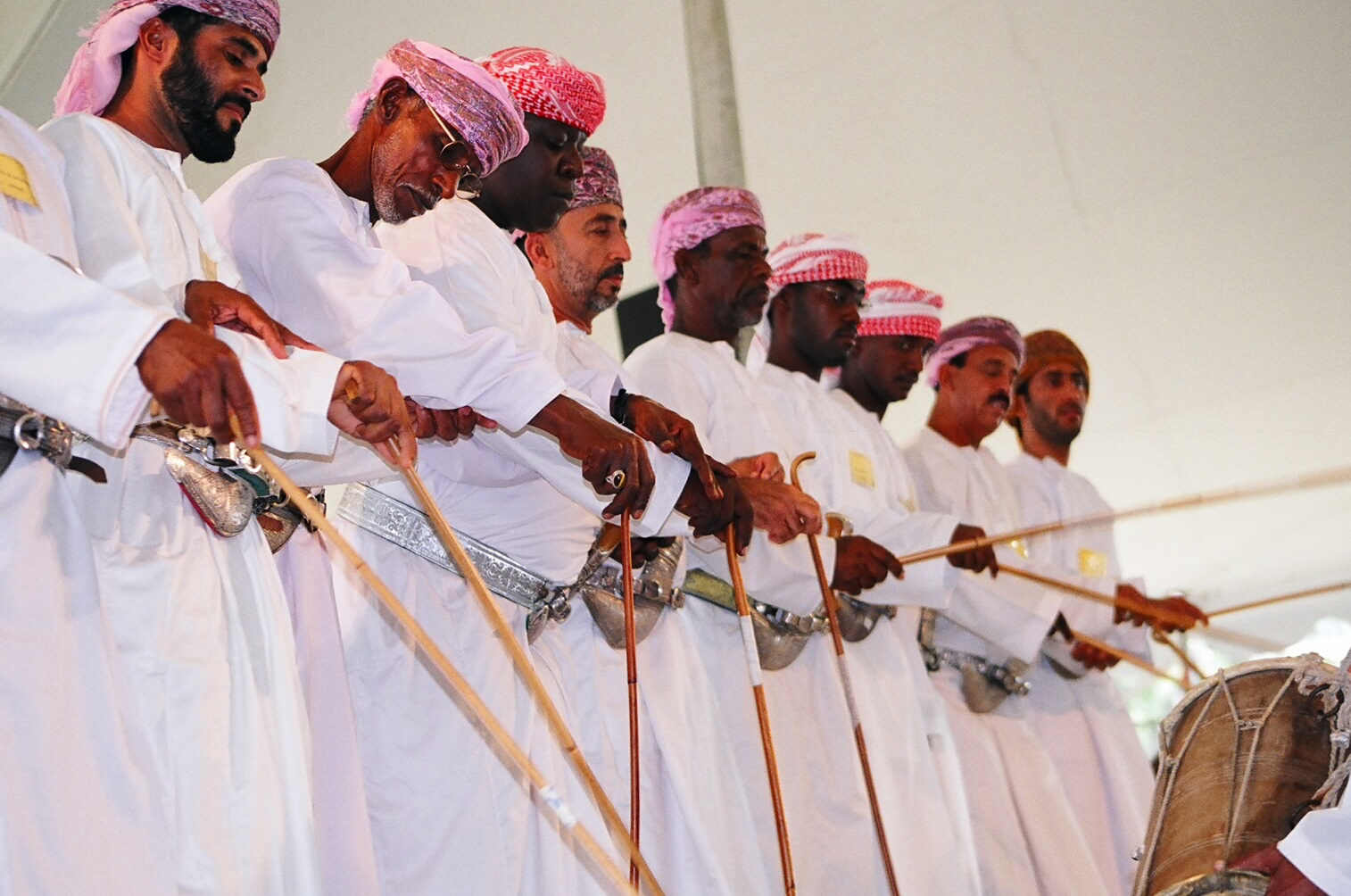
an Omani Razfa dance

The yowlah, or Al Ayyala dance, involves dance, drum music, and chanted poetry; its routine is meant to simulate a battle scene. Two rows of about twenty men face each other, carrying thin sticks of bamboo to signify spears or swords. (The performance can alternatively make use of dummy rifles made entirely of wood and metal plating or real rifles, swords, or spears.) Between the rows musicians play Emirati music on large and small drums and tambourines, brass cymbals, leather bagpipes, or flutes. The rows of men move their heads and sticks in and up and down synchronously with the drum rhythm while chanting poetic lyrics, and other performers move around the rows holding swords or guns, which they spin, throw, and perform tricks with. In the United Arab Emirates, girls wearing traditional dresses stand at the front, tossing their long hair from side to side.

The melody has seven tones in an irregular repeated pattern, and the chanted poetry varies according to the occasion.

The yowlah is performed during weddings and other festive occasions in the Sultanate of Oman, Qatar and the United Arab Emirates. Performers come from diverse backgrounds and age groups. The lead performer is usually an inherited role and is responsible for training others performers. The yowlah is inclusive of all ages, genders and social classes.

== History ==
The yowlah is considered a victory dance, and it used to be performed after a victory in a tribal war or after returning from a successful pearl diving.

The highly successful reality series Al Meydan on Sama Dubai took the yowlah (which was not widely known at the time) and created competition similar to the format American Idol whereby viewers can vote on the best dancers.

The yowlah is recorded (as al-ayyala) on UNESCO's Representative List of Intangible Cultural Heritage Items of Humanity in November 2014. It is hoped that being a part of this important list will contribute towards reviving and promoting the yowlah as part of the region's national identity and the heritage of humanity as a whole. Additionally, this listing is thought to help in transferring knowledge, skills, and the values of the yowlah from one generation to another—and to contribute towards achieving respect, mutual understanding, and peace amongst the people of the UAE.

== In popular media and politics ==
The Dubai Department of Tourism and Commerce Marketing since 2002 has organized the Shaikh Hamdan bin Mohammed bin Rashid Al Maktoum Championship, which includes the Yowlah Championship.

According to Guinness World Records, the largest yowlah dance as of 2019 took place in Fujairah on 26 November 2010, with 285 participants from three different tribes taking part in a traditional sword competition performed for the Crown Prince of Fujairah.

== See also ==
- Ardah
- Mezmar
- Middle Eastern dance
- Nadba
- Fijiri
- Sawt (music)
