= Berovka =

- Genre: Folk dance
- Time signature: 2/4
- Origin: Berovo, North Macedonia

Berovka (Macedonian: Беровка; English: Dance from Berovo) is a traditional Macedonian Oro, folk dance, from the town of Berovo in the region of Maleševo.

It is a women's dance with fast movements on a half feet with many jumps. The dancers are holding hands and begin their dance in a position of a half circle. The dance rhythm is 2/4.

== See also ==
- Music of North Macedonia
