= Skudrinka =

Skudrinka (Macedonian: Скудринка) is a traditional Macedonian Oro, folk dance, from region of Dolna Reka, region along the river of Radika in western part of North Macedonia.

It is a dance with steady movements on half feet with jumps and turnings around. The dancers are holding for a stick that is placed between the dancers and hold their hands in horizontal position. They begin their dance in a position of a half circle. The dance rhythm is 2/4.

Video of the Skudrinka folk dance by the ensamble "Orce Nikolov" on YouTube, the Skudrinka dance begins around 5min after the beginning of the video

== See also ==
- Music of North Macedonia
