= Osogovka =

Macedonian folk dance

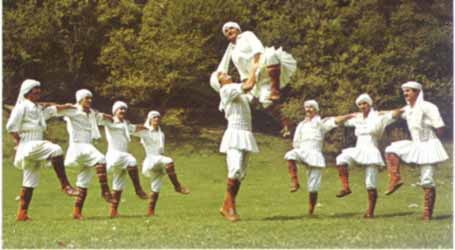
Men performing the Osogovka dance

The Osogovka (Macedonian: Осоговка) is a Macedonian folk dance.

It is an energetic line dance performed by men wearing white costumes. The dance is characterised by complex steps coupled with jumping and shouting; the leader lifts the last dancer.

The accompaniment is played on the gaida and tambura.
