= Hosa (folk tradition) =

Iraqi folk dance

Hosa هوسة
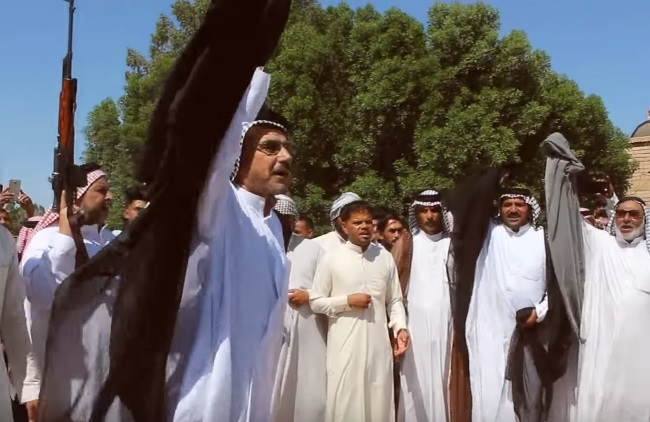
- Iraqi men performing traditional hosa
- Medium: Circle dance and chant
- Types: Variations
- Originating culture: Mesopotamian

Hosa (Iraqi Arabic: هوسة), also known as Raddasa (ردسة), is a genre of Iraqi folk poetry. It combines poetry and rhythmic dancing, and is performed during both celebratory and mournful occasions. Hosaat are most common in southern Iraq, particularly in the marshlands and rural regions.

The performance begins when a muhwaal (chant leader) recites verses in the Iraqi dialect, typically consisting of four lines. The first three serve as an introduction to the refrain (rabbat), which is considered the essence of the chant. The leader concludes by repeating the last words, raising their voice, jumping, and forcefully stomping a foot on the ground, intending to evoke enthusiasm within the audience. The surrounding participants join in by mimicking these actions, and together they form a circle, chanting the refrain in unison.

The hosaat are largely improvised and vary depending on the occasion, such as welcoming leaders or guests, funerals, weddings, wars, victories, threats, and commemorating historical events. Occasionally, participants carry decorative sticks, banners, or weapons as threats or symbols of courage.

In September 2024, hosa gained popularity on social media through a viral video shot in Amarah, Iraq, featuring the line "La tatmāda, nakhbuzak khubz al-‘Abbās" (don’t go too far, we’ll bake you like the bread of Abbas.)

== Etymology ==
The term hosa (هوسة) is believed to derive from the Arabic word hawas (هوس), which refers to a state of intense enthusiasm or ecstasy, rather than madness in the clinical sense. It is also used in Egyptian colloquial Arabic to refer to loud singing or enthusiastic vocalizations, and it is believed to have roots in Coptic or the ancient Egyptian language, where similar terms signified vocal expressions of joy or fervor.

== History ==
The exact origins of hosa in Iraq are uncertain, as no historical texts definitively date its emergence. However, Iraqi folk poetry, in its current form, is believed to be no older than two centuries. It is thought to have been developed by tribes situated in the Euphrates region.

The earliest known hosa is attributed by Anastase-Marie al-Karmali to the Al-Hindiya tribes of Karbala, who reportedly chanted "Rise, Wadi, for Baghdad is shaken!" to boost morale in resistance to Ottoman grand vizier Midhat Pasha circa 1869.

By the mid-19th century, hosa became common practice in tribal disputes and resistance against Ottoman rule. The practice was later documented in British Mandatory Iraq, particularly in the context of the Iraqi Revolt.

== Variations ==
Hosa is divided into three categories based on the region associated with each type, namely the southern, Euphrates, and western regions of Iraq. It is often inspired by religious elements.

Among the most common ahazeej (chants) in hosaat are: al-Hosa al-Hajimiya, al-Akiliya, al-Zat al-Ribatayn, al-Tajliba, al-Darmi, al-Muwashah, al-Majzou’ al-Hazaj (popular long verse poetry), and al-Hawashi, or al-Sari.

=== Various Hosa Chants ===
- "La tatmāda, nakhbuzak khubz al-‘Abbās."

"Don’t push it, we’ll bake you like the bread of Abbas."

- "Akhwān Sunnah w-Shiʿah hadha al-waṭan ma nbiʿah."

"Sunnis and Shi'ites are brothers, we will never sell this homeland."

- "Ṣalawātak ya Nabina, ḥelwa hal-laylah ʿalayna."

"O Prophet, your blessings make this night joyful for us."

== See also ==
- Middle Eastern dance
- Arabic poetry
- Maddahi
- Wedding traditions in Iraq
