= Ardah =

National dance of Arabs

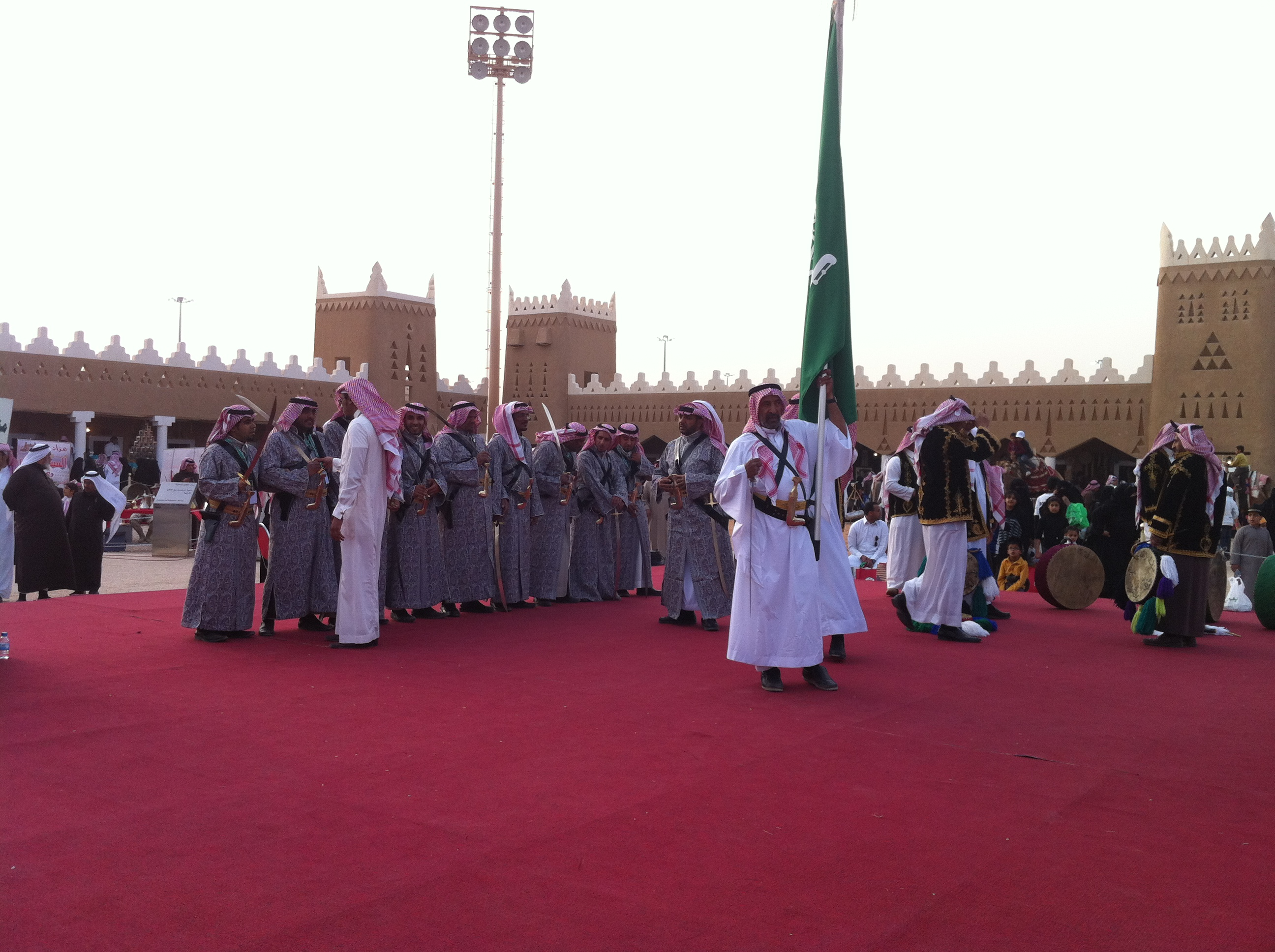
- Ardah at Jenadriyah
- Native name: العرضة
- Genre: Folkloric group dance
- Origin: Arabian Peninsula

Alardah Alnajdiyah, dance, drumming and poetry in Saudi Arabia
- UNESCO Intangible Cultural Heritage
- Country: Saudi Arabia
- Reference: 01196
- Region: Arab States

Inscription history
- Inscription: 2015 (10th session)
- List: Representative

Ardah (Arabic: العرضة / ALA-LC: al-‘arḍah) is a type of folkloric group dance in the Arabian Peninsula, in most countries located in the Gulf Cooperation Council. The dance is performed with two rows of men opposite of one another, each of whom may or may not be wielding a sword or cane, and is accompanied by drums and spoken poetry.

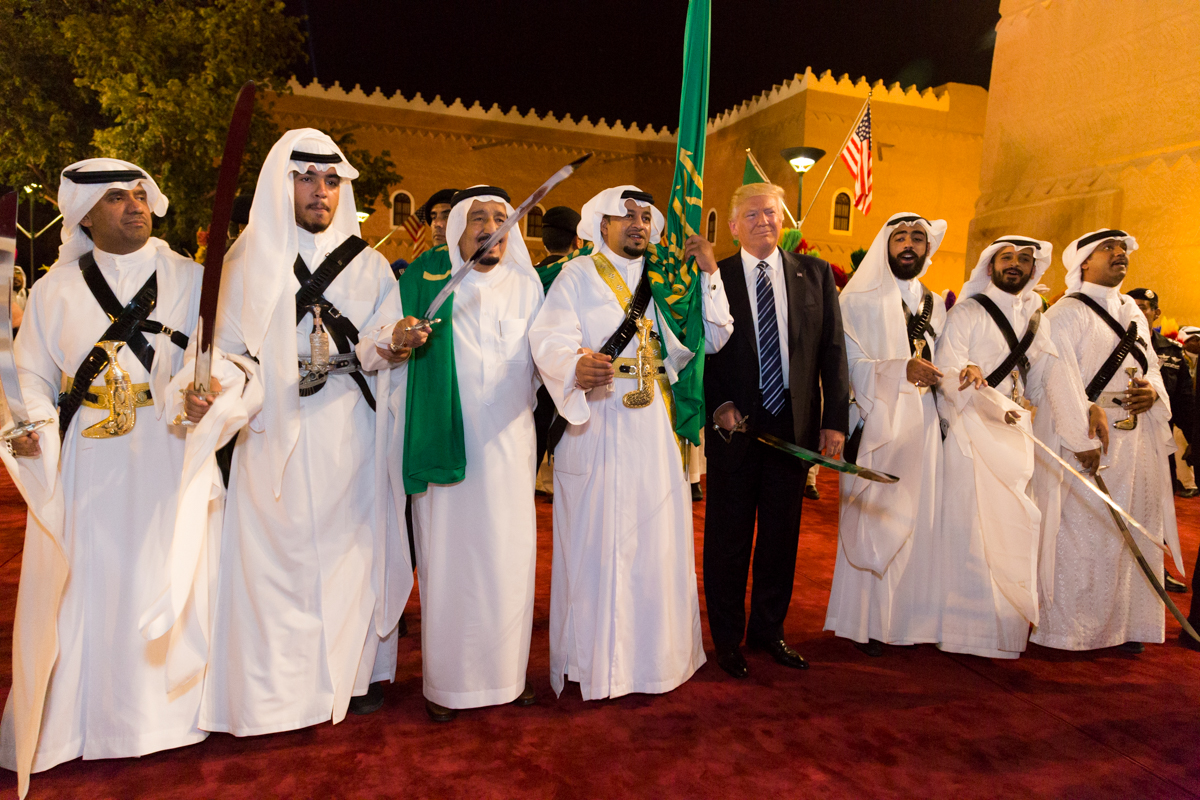
King Salman of Saudi Arabia and U.S. President Donald Trump dance the Najdi ardah at the Murabba Palace in Riyadh, 2017.

Originally, the ardah was performed only by males of tribes of the Arabian Peninsula before going to war, but nowadays it is done at celebrations, weddings, and national and cultural events by males of all tribes. There currently exists various types of ardah across the Arabian Peninsula.

It was inscribed on UNESCO's Intangible Cultural Heritage of Humanity in 2015 as Alardah Alnajdiyah.

== Variations ==
The term ardah (عَرْضَة) is thought to derive from the Arabic verb ard (عَرَضَ) meaning 'to show' or 'to parade'. It was so named because its purpose was to publicly display the fighting strength of a tribe and boost morale before an armed engagement. Although there are regional variations of the particular rendition of ardah, the purpose it serves is nearly identical throughout the Arabian Peninsula.

=== Nejdi ardah ===
Najdi ardah is the most common variant of ardah in Saudi Arabia. It is also the most practiced and highly televised male folkloric dance in the entire country. The Saudi government changed its name to 'Saudi ardah' in the 21st century. However, there are numerous variations of ardah distinct from Najdi ardah throughout the country, notably in the regions of Najran, Asir and Jizan.

== See also ==
- Middle Eastern dance
- Mizmar
- National symbols of Saudi Arabia
- Yowlah
