= Mezmar =

Traditional group performance and stick song-dance

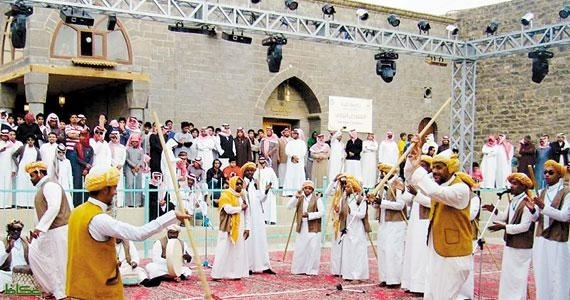
- Native name: مزمار
- Genre: Folk dance
- Origin: Hejaz, Saudi Arabia

Almezmar, drumming and dancing with sticks
- UNESCO Intangible Cultural Heritage
- Country: Saudi Arabia
- Reference: 01011
- Region: Arab States

Inscription history
- Inscription: 2016 (11th session)
- List: Representative

Mezmar or mizmar (Arabic: مزمار al-mizmar) is a traditional group performance and stick song-dance that is performed by in the Hejaz region in western Saudi Arabia for festive occasions such as wedding and national events. Almezmar is performed by about 15–100 practitioners in festive occasions such as wedding and national events, they twirl long sticks (bamboo cane), beat drums and clap to songs that can pertain to a variety of topics such as heroism, praise, chivalry, love and generosity. In the past, the ritual was associated with battle or competition. It closely resembles the tahtib dance practiced in Egypt and Sudan.

'Mizmar' is actually the generic term for almost any wind instrument found in the Hejaz or Asir, from the end-blown flute to the dual-piped boos. But the name of the art mizmar is confusing because the mizmar song-dance does not call for any wind instrument—there is no mizmar in mizmar, just drums."

In 2016, Almezmar was inscribed on the UNESCO's Representative List of the Intangible Cultural Heritage of Humanity, considered as cultural expression representing the community identity.

== See also ==
- Middle Eastern dance
- Ardah
- Yowlah
