= Khaleegy (dance) =

Folkloric dance in eastern Arabia

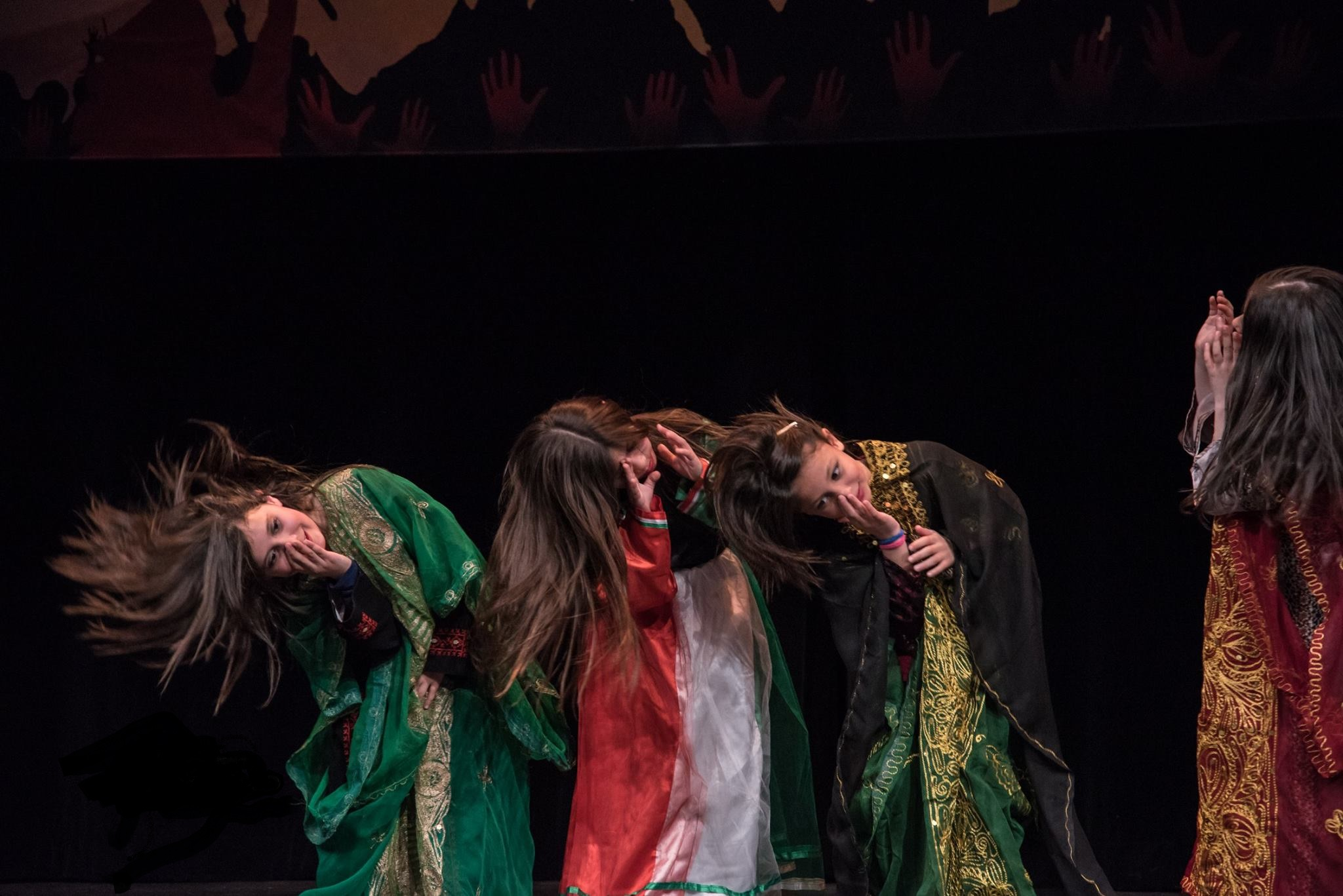
Arab girls performing Na'sh. A group of girls performing the dance are called Na'shaat.

Khaleegy (Arabic: خليجي) is a traditional pre-Islamic folkloric dance in eastern Arabia. It is a cultural dance in the countries of Saudi Arabia, Kuwait, Oman, Bahrain, Qatar and the United Arab Emirates. The name of the dance literally means "gulf" in Arabic and it is performed by young girls at weddings and other social events.

This dance entails rows of young girls in close proximity to one another who move in a slow, shuffling fashion while rhythmically swaying their hair. The young girls hips mainly remain stationary while performing this dance. Khaliji music, which accommodates the dance, has roots going back more than 1,000 years, to the Islamic period, under the Umayyads.

== Costume ==
The costume is an important aspect of this dance. It is associated mostly with colorful embroidered garments, but many regional variations of this dance are practised.

The traditional costume for khaleegy is composed of two pieces or dresses. The bottom or shift dress is molded to the figure and is made of a sturdier fabric than the top dress. It is usually not adorned or embroidered and when it is, the ornaments are very simple. The colors often contrast with the ones of the top dress to create nice color combinations.

The top dress is a long, wide, rectangular tunic-like dress called a thobe. It is traditionally made of sheer fabric to create a translucent effect and let a hint of the shift dress be seen, it is heavily embroidered from the centre and the extreme wide shoulder parts with beads, thread embroidery or anything shiny. The neckline is also beautifully ornamented. The thobe can be any color, but very bright solid tones are the most used. Additional accessories for the costume include necklaces, bracelets, and big shiny earrings. It is danced barefoot.

== Composition and meaning of the dance ==
Khaleegy is a gestural and delicate dance performed at weddings and other events involving happiness and celebration. The dance is often started with one dancer standing alone on the dance floor to begin the dance, and then the others join her.

The main movements of Khaleegy are done in a very feminine and rhythmical way. The main body parts involved in the dance are the hands, the head and the thobe itself; dancers move it to create undulating figures resembling the sea waves. The hands also make figures with different meanings: representing sea creatures like fish or turtles or they also can represent feelings. The hair, apart from the thobe is the main element used to dance Khaleegy: young girls let their long hair "dance", moving it from side to side, back and forth, in circle and making other figures.

The meaning of this dance is related to the sea and water and showing the region's beauty and richness.

== Music ==
Khaleegy is often danced to traditional Arabian Peninsula music. The most used rhythms are Adani (from the Arabian Peninsula, original from Saudi Arabia) and Nagazy. The songs have lyrics and a good dancer must know their meaning in order to express the real significance of the song in their dance. Music is accompanied with hand clapping.

Khaliji music, which accommodates the dance, has roots going back more than 1,000 years, to the Islamic period, under the Umayyads.

== See also ==
- Middle Eastern dance
