= Raqs sharqi =

Egyptian dance

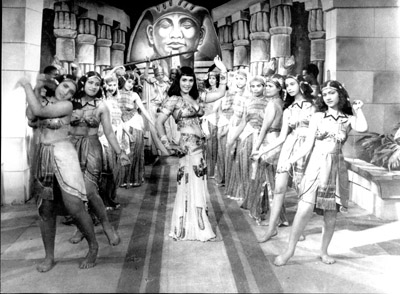
Taheyya Kariokka

Raqs sharqi (Arabic: رقص شرقي, [ˈɾɑʔsˤ ˈʃæɾʔi]; literally "Oriental dancing" or "Eastern dancing") is the classical Egyptian style of belly dance that developed during the first half of the 20th century.

== History ==
Raqs sharqi emerged as a stage/cabaret adaptation of existing Egyptian dance traditions such as social/folk dances, as well professional dance entertainers who danced at weddings and other social events.

It was popularized by Taheyya Kariokka, Samia Gamal, Naima Akef, Zeinat Olwi, and other dancers who rose to fame during the golden years of the Egyptian film industry. This has come to be considered the classical style of dance in Egypt by the 1950s. These dancers were famous not only for their role in Egyptian films, but also for their performances at the "Opera Casino" opened in 1925 by Badia Masabni. This venue was a popular place for influential musicians and choreographers from both the US and Europe, so many of the developments pioneered here can be considered new developments in the dance.

Later dancers who were influenced by these artists are Soheir Zaki, Nagwa Fouad, Fifi Abdou, and Dalilah. All rose to fame between 1960 and 1980, and are still popular today. And later generations, such as Dina, some of these later dancers were the first to choreograph and perform dances using a full 'orchestra' and stage set-up, which had a huge influence upon what is considered the 'classical' style.

Though the basic movements of raqs sharqi are unchanged, the dance form continues to evolve. Nelly Mazloum and Mahmoud Reda are noted for incorporating elements of ballet, and their influence can be seen in modern Egyptian dancers who stand on relevé as they turn or travel in a circle or figure eight.

== Costume ==
Since the 1950s, it has been illegal in Egypt for belly dancers to perform publicly with their midriff uncovered or to display excessive skin. It is therefore becoming more common to wear a long, figure-hugging lycra one-piece gown with strategically placed cut-outs filled in with sheer, flesh-coloured fabric and the skirt is sometimes embroidered. A sheer body stocking covers the midsection. Contemporary raqs sharqi costumes have evolved in design and materials.

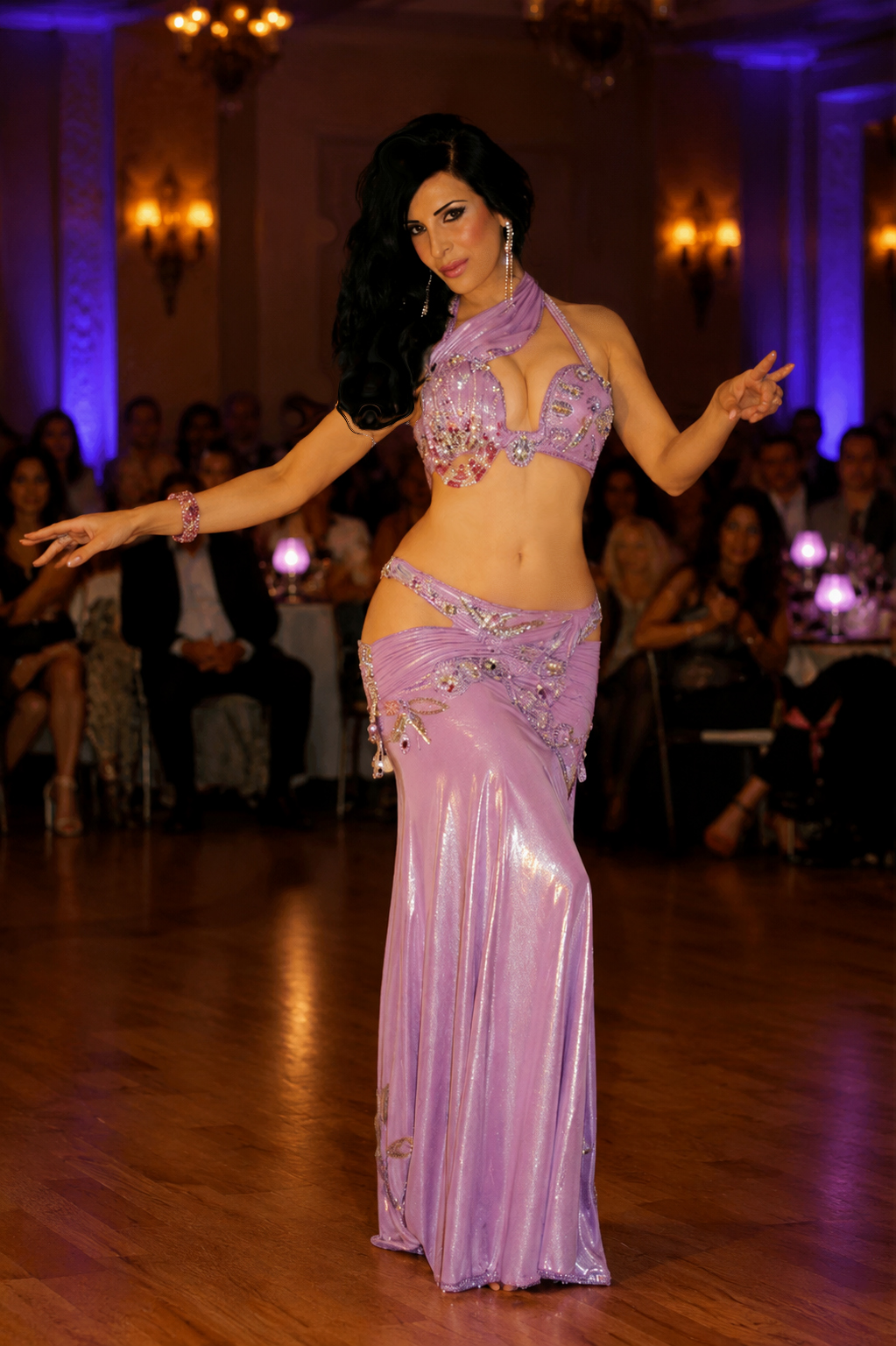
Contemporary raqs sharqi costume worn by Layla Taj

Egyptian dancers traditionally dance in bare feet, but these days often wear shoes and even high heels.

== Respectability in Egypt ==
Generally, Egyptians do not consider Raqs Sharqi to be a respectable profession. but many Egyptians continue to employ native Egyptian dancers for special events. Strict moral laws prevent a lot of local Egyptian dancers from performing in public spaces so many dancers performing for tourists in nightclubs today are foreigners.

Professional belly dancers in Egypt are subject to governmental restrictions placed on their costume and movements. Most notably, no floor work is permitted and the dancer's midriff must be covered. Dancers must be registered with the Egyptian "moral police". However, many Egyptian nightclubs don't necessarily follow the government guidelines.

In 2009, a plan to establish a state institute to train belly dancers in Egypt came under heavy fire as it "seriously challenges the Egyptian society's traditions and glaringly violates the constitution", said Farid Esmail a member of the parliament, a thing that was widely viewed by many Egyptian celebrities and dancers as hate against Egyptian arts.

== See also ==
- Turkish cultural dance
- Middle Eastern dance
