= Dabke =

Levantine folk dance

Dabke دبكة
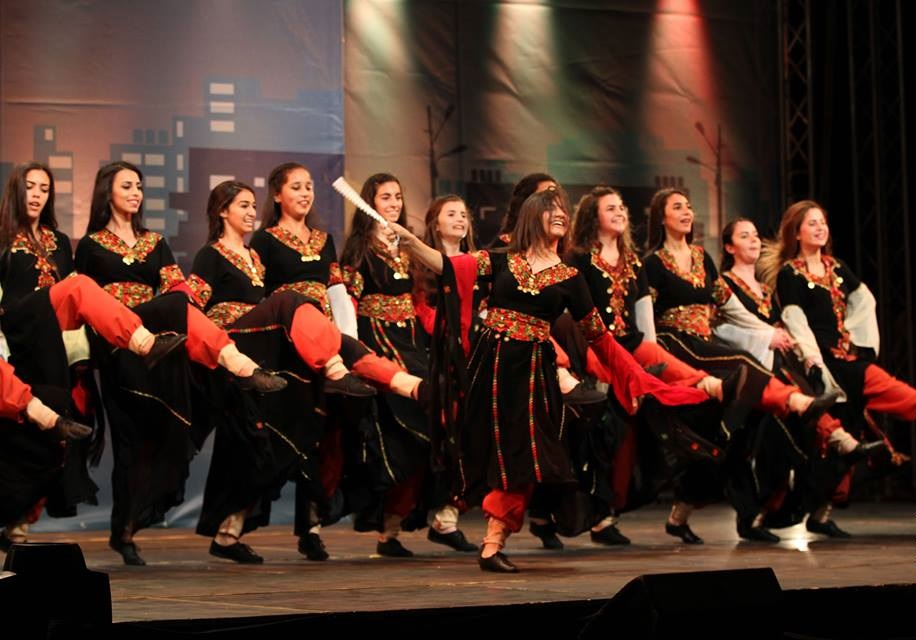
- Palestinian girls dancing traditional dabke
- Medium: Circle dance and line dancing
- Types: Variations
- Originating culture: Levantine

Dabke (Arabic: دبكة also spelled dabka, dabki, dubki, dabkeh, plural dabkaat) is a Levantine folk dance, particularly popular among Lebanese, Jordanian, Palestinian, and Syrian communities. Dabke combines circle dance and line dancing and is widely performed at weddings and other joyous occasions. The line forms from right to left and the leader of the dabke heads the line, alternating between facing the audience and the other dancers.

== Etymology ==
The etymology of 'dabke' is uncertain but is thought to be derived from the Levantine Arabic word dabaka (Arabic: دبكة) meaning "stamping of the feet" or "to make a noise".

== History ==
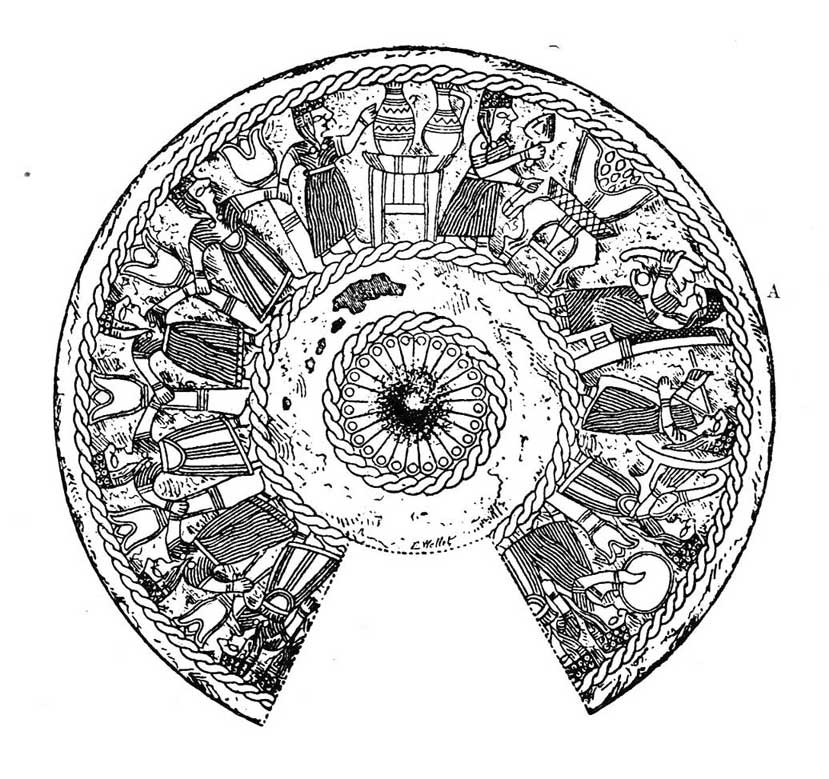
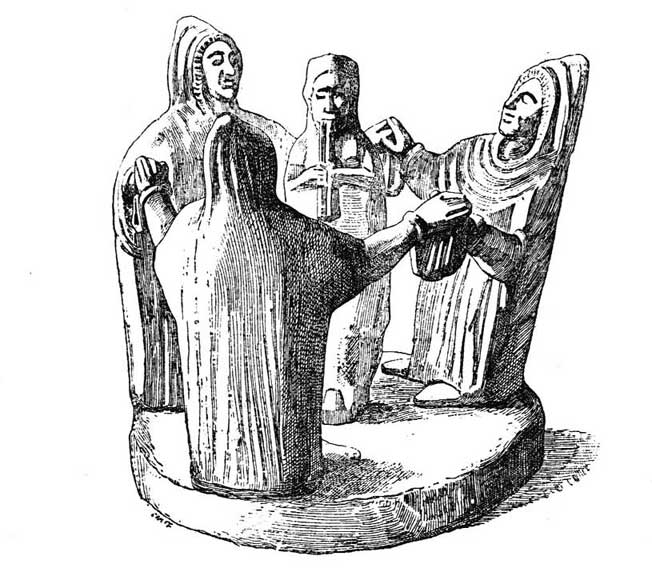
Depictions of Phoenicians dancing in a circular fashion have been found in Cyprus with images of a double-pipe aerophone and frame drum being present.

According to Youssef Ibrahim Yazbec, a Lebanese historian, journalist, and politician, the dabke descends from Phoenician dances thousands of years old. According to Palestinian folklorists Abdul-Latif Barghouthi and Awwad Sa'ud al-'Awwad, the dabke jumps may have originated in ancient Canaanite fertility rituals related to agriculture, chasing off evil spirits and protecting young plants.

Another theory is that the stomping part of dabke started out as a way of solidifying roofs made of mud. People would stomp on the rooftops of houses together to help compress the material to compact it to prevent cracks from forming. This eventually evolved into the dancing form of dabke that is known today.

== Variations ==
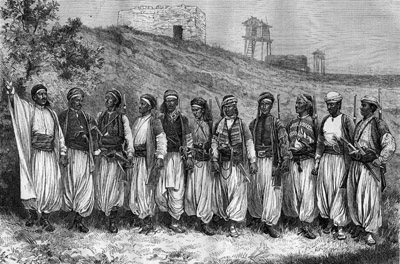
Alawite men dancing dabke, 1880

Dabke is popular across the Levant, Each type of dabke dance has its own corresponding set of songs, the theme of which is often love there are six main types of dabke:

1. Al-Shamaliyya in Palestine (الشمالية): It consists of a lawweeḥ (لويح) at the head of a group of men holding hands and formed in a semicircle. The lawweeh is expected to be particularly skilled in accuracy, ability to improvise, and quickness (generally light on his feet). Typically, the dabke begins with a musician playing a solo on the mijwiz or yarghoul of a Dal Ouna piece, often with two singers accompanying his music. The dancers develop a synchronized movement and step and when the singers finish their song, the lawweeh breaks from the semicircle to dance on his own. When the leader of the dabke sees that the men's steps are one, in sync, he instructs the dancers to slow down and begin a movement crossing their right foot in front of the opposite one (their left foot). The lawweeh continues to inform the dancers of their basic rhythms, and at this point other guests at the wedding or event occurring will join in the dabke line. This is the most popular and familiar form of dabke danced for happy family celebrations, such as weddings, circumcisions, the return of travelers, release of prisoners, and also for national holidays, in which dabke becomes a demonstration of national personality. It has six measure phrases.
2. Al-Sha’rawiyya (الشعراوية): is limited to men and is characterized by strong steps or stomps. It is one of the simplest types of dabke and very close to the normal one. The lawweeh is the most important element in this type of dabke. It has six measure phrases.
3. Al-Karaadiyya (الكرادية) also known as Al-Ṭaiyyara (الطيارة): is characterized by a lack of a lawweeh and slow movement with an azif (عازف) (flute player) in the middle of the circle. In Palestine, it is characterized by its fast rhythm in an open circle, and it is performed from left to right. It has square phrases (of four or eight measures).
4. Al-Farah (الفره): is one of the most active types of dabke and therefore requires a high degree of physical fitness.
5. Al-Ghazal (الغزل): is characterized by three strong stomps of the right foot, and is usually tiring for those dancing.

=== Regional varieties ===
There are about twenty types of dabke, including but not limited to:

- Habel Mwadea’ (حبل مودع): is the Jordanian dabke of any type performed by men and women jointly.
- Al-Tas’awiyya (التسعاوية) also known as Al-Ma’aniyya (المعانية): It Is performed in Ma'an city in South Jordan.
- Al-Darrazi (الدرازي): It is played on Mijwiz, widely famous in Jordan and Palestine.
- Al-’Askariyya (العسكرية):
- Al-Joufiyya (الجوفية): it consists of two groups stand in opposition to each other: the first group sings and the second responses with Jordanian folkloric songs.
- Al-Ghawarneh (الغوارنة) also known as Deir ’Ala (دير علا): performed in Jordan Valley, and it's one of the fastest types of dabke.
- Abu ’Alanda (أبو علنده)
- Al-Aqabawiyya (العقباوية): It is performed in Aqaba in South Jordan.
- Al-Ramthawiyya (الرمثاوية): It is performed in Ar-Ramtha in North Jordan.
- Al-Sahja (السحجة): is a popular Palestinian and Jordanian dance. Al-Saḥja belongs mostly to northern and central Palestine, and in the south has two kinds: As-Samir (السامر) and Al-Dahiyya (الدحية). As-Samir's form involves 2 rows of men on opposite walls, competing with folk poetry, sometimes improvised and even exchanging insults, competing in cleverness of retorts. Al-Daḥiyya is a Bedouin version of the same kind in which there is a professional dancer that dances between the two opposing walls of men who are competing for her attention, and at times give her money. Al-Sahja usually occurs the night before the wedding party of the groom (zafat al-'arees), with most of the men in the village participating, especially those who will be attending or are directly involved in the other wedding festivities.
- Al-Daḥiyya (الدحية) limited to men: It is close to Al-sahja dance. It's performed by southern Palestinians and Southern Jordanians.
- Al-Ḥashi (الحاشي) limited to women
- Al-Farradiyya (الفرّادية) limited to women
- Al-Jamma’iyya (الجمّاعية) also limited to women
- Al-’Adiyya (العادية) also known as Al-Dalo’una (دبكة الدلعونا) is a type of dabke danced in Palestine, Lebanon, Syria, and Jordan.
- Dabke niswaniyyah, danced specifically by women in Palestine.

== Song genres ==
There are numerous kinds of songs that are sung during and specifically for dabke, by both men and women respectively, depending on the occasion, song, and audience. Some of the most popular of these songs, such as Dal Ouna (دلعونا), Al Jafra (الجفرا), Al Daḥiyya (الدحية), and Ẓareef il-Ṭool (ظريف الطول), are actually entire genres in themselves, in the sense that lyrics can vary significantly in each performance but the basic rhythm of the music is consistent and recognizable. This variation can be seen in the hundreds of lyrical variations heard and recorded of these songs which regardless of specific lyrics, are recognized by their rhythm and at times, a single phrase, as in Ala Dal Ouna, Jafra, and others. For example, even though one might have heard Ala Dal Ouna sung previously telling a different story in this famous love song, people will still call another song ascribing to the same rhythm and theme as Dal Ouna.

The majority of dabke music, being folk songs, is on maqam Bayati musical mode.

== Instruments ==
The Oud (عود), from which the English word "lute" comes, is shaped like half a pear with a short non-fretted neck. It has six courses of two strings and played with a plectrum, usually a trimmed eagle's feather. This instrument creates a deep and mellow sound.

The mijwiz (مجوز), which means "double" in Arabic, is very popular in Levantine music. It is a type of reed clarinet that is played by breathing smoothly through a circular aperture at the end and by moving the fingers over the holes down the front of the tube in order to create the different notes. The minjjayrah is similar to the mijwiz, an open ended reed flute played in the same style.

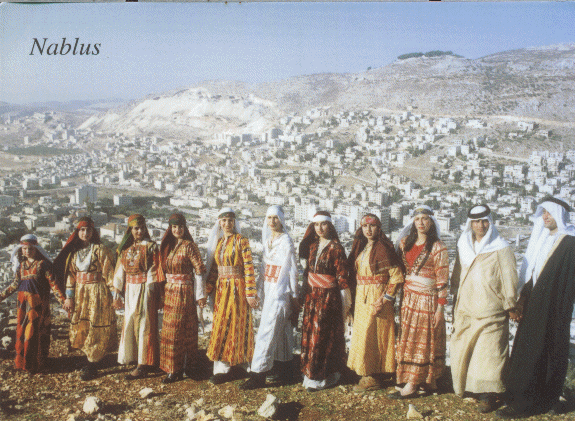
Dabkeh band on Mount Gerizim in Nablus

The ṭablah (طبلة) is a small hand-drum also known as the durbakke. Most tablahs are beautifully decorated, some with wood, tile or bone inlay, etched metal, or paintings in designs typical of the Near East. One of the most commonly played of the percussion instruments; the tablah is a membranophone of goat or fish skin stretched over a vase-shaped drum with a wide neck. Usually made of earthenware or metal, it is placed either under the left arm or between the legs and struck in the middle for the strong beats and on the edge for the sharp in-between beats. Though today fishskin heads are rarely used due to the climate. When the fishskin becomes loose, the drum head is heated to retighten the membrane, retune the instrument, and thus restore its correct sound. The membrane or head of the drum is now made out of plastic. The most commonly produced heads are from Alexandria, Egypt.

The daff (دف), also known as the Riq (رق), is similar to the tambourine. It consists of a round frame, covered on one side with goat or fish skin. Pairs of metal discs are set into the frame to produce the jingle when struck by the hand. The sounds of this percussion instrument set the rhythm of much Arab music, particularly in the performances of classical pieces.

The arghul (يرغول), also known as the yarghoul, is commonly used in solos, often accompanied by singers, that begin dabke performances. Unlike the mijwiz, it only has finger holes in one of its pipes/reeds. (see Al-Shamaliyya, under Types).

The Shubabeh (شبابة) is a woodwind instrument traditionally made from reed cane. It differs from the Mijwiz and Arghul in that it does not have a reed, instead the musician blows against the side of the instrument at an angle to produce the tone. The Shubabeh is traditionally played by herders in the wilderness.

== Competitions and performances ==
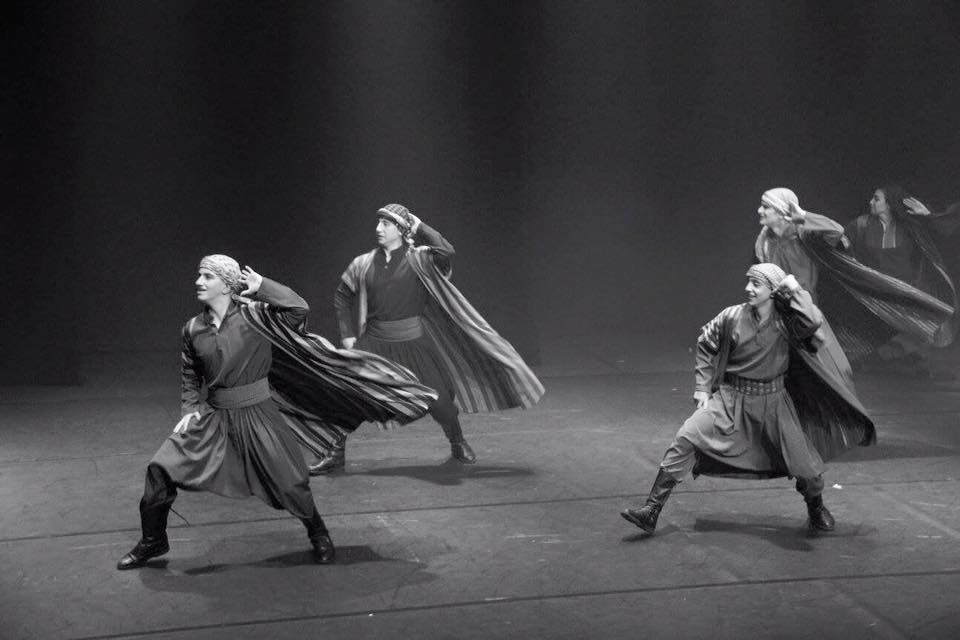
Palestinian men dancing dabke

Dabke competitions or shows often consist of different cultural dances and various troupes performing dabke.

Many universities host events called Arab Night or a title to that effect. When these shows occur, dabke is either performed on stage (inside or outside), in a hall on the floor, or outside on the floor. There are different steps that comprise the Dabke dance: the belbel, the inzel, shemmel and taxi; a combination of each of these steps as well as the occasional jump and turn make the dance complete.

In America, the tradition has persisted and is held in the same kind of communal spaces as it would in the Levant. Dance music is also commonly played in America at Arab-community cultural centers and conventions such as Lebanese American festivals around the country and the annual convention hosted by the American Federation of Ramallah Palestine.

In her study titled Syrian Radical Dabka, ethnomusicologist Shayna Silverstein described the changes in social interpretations and performances of dabke as performed in Syria. In the 20th century and beyond, dabke has both been interpreted as an element of nationalist ideologies or as a modern and aesthetic form of folk dance, performed by academically trained dancers from the Higher Institute of Dramatic Arts. To reinforce these interpretations and the continuation of dabke in rural as well as in urban settings, performances have been promoted countrywide by government-sponsored folk dance ensembles as well as in educational programs disseminated by the Ministry of Culture. Since the beginning of the Syrian Civil War, dabke performances as a manifestation of community gatherings have further accompanied protest meetings and demonstrations against the ruling government of Syria.

== World records ==
In August 2011, a group in a Lebanese village Dhour El Choueir, Lebanon set a new world record. Organized by Dhour El Choueir Summer Festival, a human chain of 5,050 was made and currently holds the world record. This event broke the record set by Tollab, the Lebanese Student Federation in Montreal, with the participation of "La Troupe Folklorique Les Chevaliers du Liban" that had made a human chain of 4,475 people dancing the dabke for more than five minutes straight at Montreal's Marcelin Wilson Park. Tollab had itself broken a record of 2,743 set by a group of Israeli Arabs in Acre, Israel. An earlier record of 1,700 had been set in Toronto.

== See also ==
- Halay
- Hora (dance)
- Middle Eastern dance
- Sirtaki
- Syrtos
