= List of anthropology journals =

Academic anthropological knowledge is the product of lengthy research, and is published in recognized peer-reviewed academic journals. As part of this peer review, theories and reports are rigorously and comparatively tested before publication. The following publications are generally recognized as the major sources of anthropological knowledge.

== Four-field journals ==
These journals publish articles in the four fields of anthropology: archaeology, biological, cultural, and linguistic.

- American Anthropologist: premier journal of the American Anthropological Association, incorporating all four fields
- Annual Review of Anthropology: published by Annual Reviews; releases an annual volume of review articles
- Current Anthropology: published by the University of Chicago Press and sponsored by the Wenner-Gren Foundation for Anthropological Research
- Journal of Anthropological Sciences: published by the Istituto Italiano di Antropologia

== Archaeology ==
- See List of archaeology journals

== Cultural anthropology journals ==
- American Ethnologist: published by the American Ethnological Society, a sub-section of the American Anthropological Association; quarterly journal concerned with ethnology in the broadest sense of the term
- Anthropological Forum: since 1963, published by Taylor & Francis and hosted by the University of Western Australia
- Anthropological Quarterly: since 2001, published by the George Washington University's Institute for Ethnographic Research
- Cultural Anthropology: quarterly journal published by Wiley-Blackwell and the American Anthropological Association on behalf of the Society for Cultural Anthropology
- Ethnology: published by the University of Pittsburgh, specializes in ethnographic articles and cross-cultural studies
- HAU: Journal of Ethnographic Theory: since 2011, published by the Centre for Ethnographic Theory (SOAS, University of London)
- Public Culture: published by Duke University Press for the Institute for Public Knowledge; seeks to address "the cultural transformations associated with cities, media and consumption, and the cultural flows that draw cities, societies and states into larger transnational relationships and global political economies"

=== Journals on cultural anthropology topics ===
- Anthropology of Consciousness: publication of the Society for the Anthropology of Consciousness, by the American Anthropological Association since 1990
- Human Organization: journal of the Society for Applied Anthropology; primary objective is the scientific investigation of the principles controlling the relations of human beings to one another and the wide application of these principles to practical problems
- Journal of Contemporary Ethnography: published by SAGE Publications; covers research in ethnography
- Medical Anthropology Quarterly: published for the Society for Medical Anthropology by the American Anthropological Association; addresses topics in human health and disease from anthropological perspectives
- Ñeʼẽ. Revista de Investigación Lingüística y Cultural: published by Fundación Yvy Marãe’ỹ; covers research in linguistics, cultural anthropology, sociolinguistics and related fields
- Visual Anthropology Review: publication of the Society for Visual Anthropology, by the American Anthropological Association

=== Historical anthropology journals ===
- Comparative Studies in Society and History: published quarterly by Cambridge University Press on behalf of the Society for Comparative Study of Society and History
- Ethnohistory: published quarterly by Duke University Press on behalf of the American Society for Ethnohistory
- History and Anthropology: published quarterly by Routledge; addresses the intersection of history and social sciences, focusing on the interchange between anthropologically-informed history, historically-informed anthropology and the history of ethnographic and anthropological representation

=== Journals by geographic area of coverage ===
- Africa: Journal of the International African Institute: published by Cambridge University Press on behalf of the International African Institute
- Anthropological Journal of European Cultures: published by Berghahn Books; covers research addressing the cultural and social changes of the societies in contemporary Europe
- The Australian Journal of Anthropology: published triannually by Wiley-Blackwell on behalf of the Australian Anthropological Society; covers anthropological topics including theoretically focused analyses and ethnographic reports in the Pacific and Asian regions neighbouring Australia
- Bijdragen tot de Taal-, Land- en Volkenkunde: published in English by the Royal Netherlands Institute of Southeast Asian and Caribbean Studies; focuses on linguistics, anthropology, and history of Southeast Asia, and more specifically of Indonesia
- Journal de la Société des Américanistes (Journal of the Society of Americanists): covers the cultural anthropology of the Americas
- Oceania: publishes contributions in the field of social and cultural anthropology; primary regional orientation is to the peoples of Oceania, primarily comprising Australia, Melanesia, Polynesia, Micronesia and southeast Asia

== Social anthropology journals ==
- Anthropological Theory: critical journal published by SAGE, bringing social anthropology into contact with social theory
- L'Homme: Revue française d'anthropologie: French anthropological journal established as a French counterpart to Man and American Anthropologist
- Journal of the Royal Anthropological Institute: published by Wiley-Blackwell on behalf of the Royal Anthropological Institute of Great Britain and Ireland
- Social Analysis: published by Berghahn Books; presents contributions directed toward a critical and theoretical understanding of cultural, political, and social processes
- Social Anthropology: published since 2007 by Wiley-Blackwell on behalf of the European Association of Social Anthropologists; established in 1992; originally published by Cambridge University Press
- Journal of the Anthropological Society of Oxford: published by the Anthropological Society of Oxford; established 1970
- Journal of Early Modern Studies: published by Zeta Books; established 2012
- Revue Européenne des Migrations Internationales; published by University of Poitiers (France); established 1985
- Sociologus: German anthropological journal; published since 1925 by Duncker & Humblot Publishers, Berlin
- Ethnography: Interdisciplinary journal that bridges sociology and anthropology and concentrates on the ethnographic study of social and cultural change

== Anthropological linguistics ==
- Anthropological Linguistics (journal)
- Manuscript Studies

== Others ==
- African Anthropologist, a professional journal
- American Journal of Physical Anthropology, a professional journal
- Anthropological Index Online, a professional journal indexing service
- Anthropological Literature, an online database of citations to journal articles and articles in edited volumes and symposia held by the Tozzer Library
- Anthropology Today, a professional journal
- Economic Anthropology, a professional journal
- Evolutionary Anthropology (journal), a professional journal
- Journal of Anthropological Archaeology, a professional journal
