= Holkham Bible =

14th-century Norman French illustrated Bible produced in England

- London, British Library, Additional MS 47682
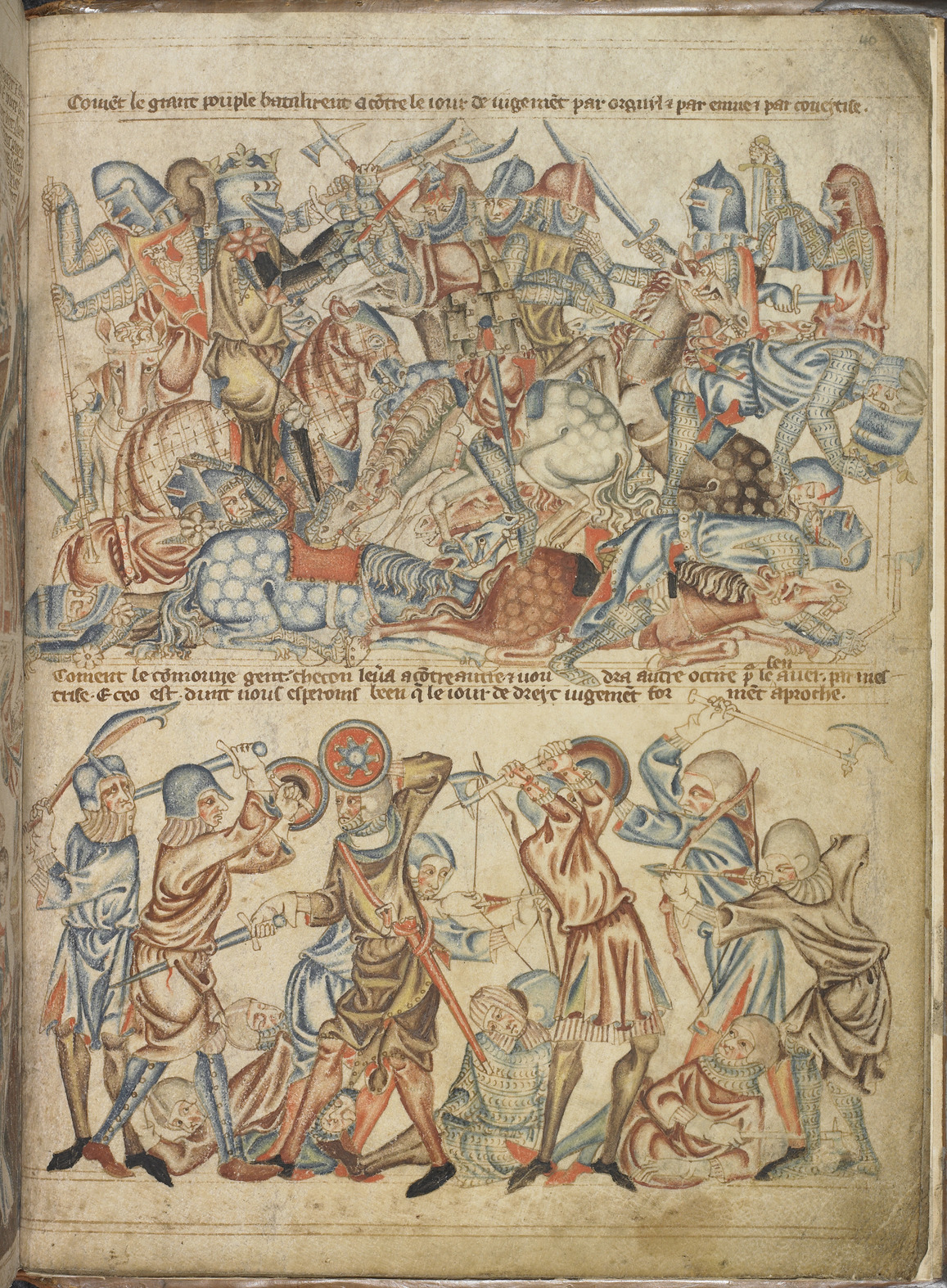
- Holkham Bible, f. 40r
- Also known as: Holkham Bible Picture Book
- Date: c.1327–1335
- Place of origin: England, S.E. (London?)
- Language: Anglo-Norman French with some Middle English
- Patron: Likely commissioned by a Dominican friar
- Material: Parchment, ink, coloured washes
- Size: 285 × 210 (265 × 200) mm
- Script: Gothic and Gothic cursive
- Illumination(s): 231 miniatures; initials with penwork decoration
- Previously kept: Norfolk, Holkham Hall, MS 666

The Holkham Bible (London, British Library, Additional MS 47682) is an illustrated collection of biblical and apocryphal stories in Norman French. The picture book was produced in England during the decades before 1350 for use by an unidentified Dominican friar. Its illustrations depict the stories in contemporary English settings, making it a visual source on medieval English society.

== Contents and decoration ==
The Holkham Bible is a biblical picture book consisting of 42 parchment leaves bearing 231 pen-and-ink drawings, usually two per page. Each drawing is tinted with coloured washes consisting of pigments of reds, blues, browns, yellows, and greens. Short explanatory captions in Anglo-Norman French, sometimes in verse, typically appear above each miniature, though some captions are situated below or incorporated into the miniature itself (e.g., f. 11r–11v). After opening with a presentation miniature (f. 1r) and a representation of the Wheel of Fortune (f. 1v), the miniatures turn to their primary subject. They cover,

1. the Book of Genesis, from Creation to the Flood (ff. 2r–9r);
2. genealogies of Mary and Jesus via two Jesse Trees (f. 10r–10v);
3. representations of the Four Evangelists with their symbols (ff. 10v–11v);
4. the Life of Christ, from the Annunciation to the Ascension (ff. 11v–38r); and
5. the ‘Last Things’, fifteen signs which precede the Second Coming and Last Judgment (ff. 39r–42v).

(Note that ff. 9v and 38v are blank.)

In the Genesis section (ff. 2r–9r), the miniatures include a red ink diaperwork background with vine and oak leaves, fleur-de-lis, and floral motifs, and the captions open with enlarged decorative initials in red or blue with penwork decoration—details not included elsewhere in the manuscript. Majuscules heightened by a stroke of red ink appear throughout the codex.

== History and provenance ==
Internal evidence suggests that Holkham Bible was likely commissioned by or for an unidentified Dominican friar. Occupying the manuscript's opening leaf is a miniature depicting a friar standing next to a seated scribe or limner with a banderole or ‘speech scroll’ extending from each man's mouth. The scrolls show the friar saying “Ore feres bien e nettement car mustre serra a riche gent” (‘Now do [it] well and thoroughly for it will be shown to important people’), to which the artisan replies “Si frai voyre e Deux me doynt vivere Nonkes ne veyses un autretel Liuere” (‘I will do so truly, if God grants me to live; never will you see another such book’). The nature of the exchange, together with the miniature's placement at the opening of the codex—i.e., at f. 1r, functioning as a frontispiece—suggest that it is a type of presentation miniature: a symbolic representation of a manuscript's patron or donor being presented with the finished book in which the miniature appears, or, as here, in the act of commissioning the book. Such miniatures are not unusual in medieval illuminated manuscripts.

Although of English origin, the manuscript was in continental Europe by 1816 when William Roscoe, writing to Thomas Coke, 1st Earl of Leicester, of Holkham, reported that it had just returned to England from the Continent; over a century later, M.R. James speculated that it may have “been taken abroad in the sixteenth century by some Catholic family … leaving England under the stress of the Reformation”. According to Roscoe's letter, the auctioneer Winstanley “bought [the book] from a Catholic priest … for £28”, and Roscoe could purchase it on Coke's behalf for £30. Apparently Coke agreed: a note added on a flyleaf (f. i v) states that he obtained the codex from "Mr Roscoe" in 1816. As MS 666, it remained part of the library of Holkham Hall, Norfolk, until 1952 when it entered the collections of the British Library (then the British Museum) with several other Holkham Hall manuscripts.

== Editions and facsimiles ==
In 1954, W.O. Hassall, Bodleian Library staff member and Librarian to the Earl of Leicester, edited and introduced a facsimile edition of the Holkham Bible for the Roxburghe Club. The British Library published an updated facsimile edition, edited by Michelle P. Brown, in 2007.

A digital surrogate of the manuscript can be viewed online via the British Library's Digitised Manuscripts site.

== See also ==
- Bible moralisée
- Biblia pauperum
- Block book
- Velislai biblia picta
