= Assyrian weddings =

Marriage ceremonies of the Assyrian people

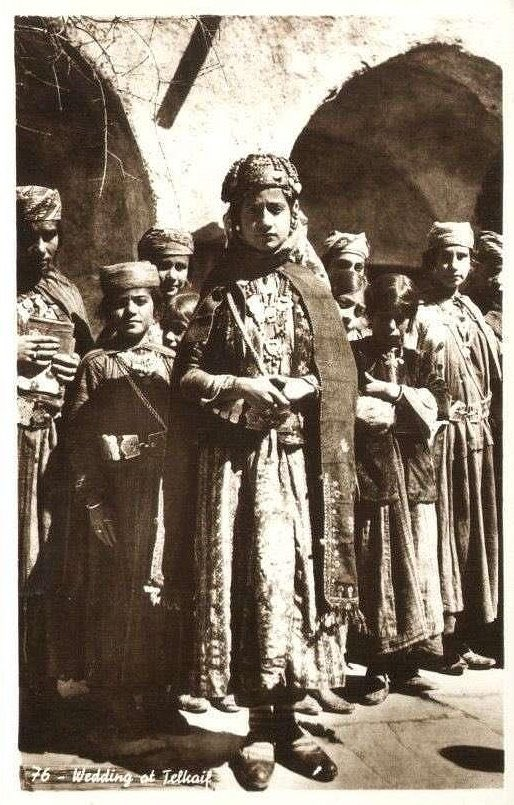
Assyrian wedding in Tel Keppe, mid-1950s

Assyrian weddings are marriage ceremonies that contain influences of Assyrian culture or other practices traditionally performed by the Assyrian people. Modern wedding celebrations are a combination of various Assyrian traditions and aspects of modern culture, such as music, that have increased popular discussions within the community.

== Traditional views ==
Among Assyrian marriages, such as those in Midyat, monogamy between man and woman are favored and divorce is forbidden, such being rare until greater moves to diaspora. The most common forms of marriage are those that are either arranged or where the couple fall in love naturally, though the older generations typically have a greater say in how the marriage proceeds. In the past, the marriage age for individual Assyrians was a lot younger due to threats of kidnapping/rape from neighboring Muslim populations.

In the past, some weddings would span over seven whole days, but in the modern era are typically much shorter and are dedicated to a single day. Wedding celebrations often involved entire villages as the streets were filled with people showering the to-be couple with flowers and blessings. Families of to-be wedded couples emphasize following traditions from the homeland, especially as marriage is taken very seriously. (Note: Many community members feel that identity will be lost if traditions are not explicitly followed as they were in the past) However, most wedding traditions have been abandoned. Assyrian generally emphasize marrying within their own community and interracial marriages are uncommon.

== Pre-wedding traditions ==
=== Before wedding day ===
Traditionally in the Assyrian community, it is not considered polite to just go to the house of a girl one likes, so the family of the to-be groom begins to look for a potential match. A pre-engagement gathering called the Mashmētā (Syriac: ܡܲܫܡܲܥܬܵܐ, lit. 'hearing, proposal') takes place where the suitor's family will visit that of the woman and ask for her and their son to be married. The groom does not attend, and the woman is instructed to stay in her room while negotiations take place. If the family accepts, they will start to pick a day for the engagement party, but not before the woman is told of the outcome. The tradition is also performed by Chaldean Catholics from Iraq and Turkey; the former is known as Tanētā (Syriac: ܬܲܢܲܝܬܵܐ) and is similar to Mashmeta, but may also include gifting of jewelry to the bride's family. The latter is known as Pṯākhā Urkhā (Syriac: ܦܬ݂ܵܚܵܐ ܐܘܼܪܚܵܐ, lit. 'opening a path').

In southeastern Turkey, the man's family will go to see the girl bringing flowers and sweets; the father starts by saying "If you accept, we have come to be your relatives." The marriage between the man and woman is not decided immediately, as the bride and her family for time to consider the marriage proposal. Men would usually be required to have reached the age of marriage, as well as having completed mandatory military service before the ritual takes place. If the girl accepts the proposal, they are bestowed jewelry by the church, which is typically a cross. The families then decide the day of the engagement. Couples are not restricted from seeing each other, but unless someone from the girl's family is present, she is not allowed to show her face to the groom.

A week before some weddings, female relatives will work together to knit a honeymoon blanket while dances are performed by younger women. Henna rituals are also commonly performed; although these celebrations used to be female-exclusive, they've since become mixed-gender festivities.

=== Bridewealth ===
Bridewealth (Syriac: ܢܸܩܕܵܐ, romanized: niqdā) is commonly practised, even among those who reside in the diaspora. The tradition would involve the bridegroom's family paying the father of the bride. The amount of money of the bridewealth is reached by negotiation between groups of people from both families. The social state of the groom's family influences the amount of the bridewealth that is ought to be paid. When the matter is settled to the contentment of both menages, the groom's father may kiss the hand of the bride's father to express his chivalrous regard and gratitude.

Similarly, Dḇāqtā d'Tarʿā (Syriac: ܕܒ݂ܵܩܬܵܐ ܕܬܲܪܥܵܐ, lit. 'holding of the door') is a tradition where the groom's family comes to the bride's house to take the bride, but her brother/cousin will not let her leave the door. This is a gesture of unwillingness to give up the daughter to the family of the groom. Eventually, the groom will start to bribe the bride's family until a good sum of money is achieved, and then the bride will be allowed to meet with the groom. This tradition is commonly performed by Assyrians in the Khabour region of Syria, where it has survived to the present day. However, Assyrians in Iraq and Iran also commonly perform the tradition as well.

Bridewealth was practiced among Assyrians from Midyat until recently, and families are typically met with punishments from the church if they ask for a bride price.

=== Showering of the groom ===
The showering of the groom (Syriac: ܚܝܵܦܬܵܐ ܕܚܸܬܢܵܐ, romanized: khyāptā d’khitnā) is a tradition where the male relatives of the groom meet at his home to trim his hair, shave his face, and wash his body. At the same time, a group of female singers will sing a song called "Lilyana". This tradition is meant to physically and spiritually cleanse the groom before his wedding, and is performed by Assyrians from Hakkari and Urmia. The tradition of showering the groom is descended from ancient Assyria, where water was considered a form of purification against evil.

=== Breaking items ===
A member of the groom's family, usually a female figure, is expected to ‘steal’ a valuable item from the bride's home and then break it in front of her family. It's believed that this trend symbolizes the coming of good luck for the marriage and the strength of the couple. Some families will also take part in a tradition where a jar of sweets and coins is broken onto the ground for good luck.

=== Blessing by the priest ===
The Burākhā (Syriac: ܒܘܼܪܵܟ݂ܵܐ, lit. 'blessing') is a wedding tradition where the bride and groom are blessed by a priest in a church. This traditionally lasted about four hours, but more recently the event goes for about one hour. Pins in the shape of two crosses are usually placed on the groom's back, as a symbol of protection of the groom for the incoming marriage. There are some details during the ceremony that differ from village to village. To ward off evil spirits, the Assyrians of Baz are known to have someone poke the groom with a needle to ward off any evil spirits while Assyrians from Tyari make noise with the cutting motion of scissors. The tradition of the priest's blessing and the pinned crosses is also present among Assyrians from Iraq, while that of the blessing is present amongst Assyrians from Turkey. Assyrian marriages in Turkey are not carried out by the priest until they receive official documentation for the wedded couple.

Couples may also wear a set of silken armlets in red and white colors known as a kleelā (Syriac: ܟܠܝܼܠܵܐ, lit. 'crown, wreath'), symbolizing the body and soul coming together in marriage. Assyrians from Iraq may have white armlets to symbolize the marriage as a blessed sacrament, though Syriac Orthodox Assyrians do not have this tradition.

== During the wedding ==
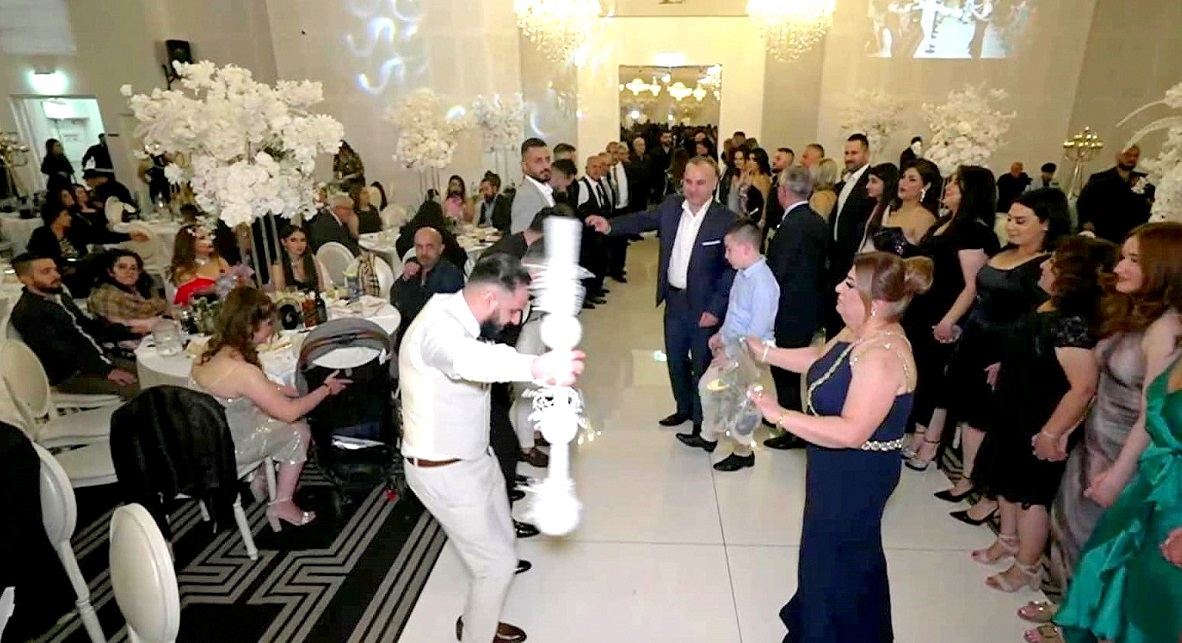
Khigga performance at an Assyrian wedding

Assyrian weddings always include performances of traditional Khigga as part of celebrations. The dances are performed with all participants standing side by side clasping hands, and moving in a circular motion. It's customary for the groom of the wedding to be head of the dance line (Syriac: ܪܹܝܫܵܐ ܕܚܸܓܵܐ, romanized: Rēshā d'Khiggā, lit. 'Head of the Khigga'), holding a decorated staff (Syriac: ܟܘܿܦܵܠܵܐ, romanized: kopālā) in their hand; however, because Khigga performances go throughout the night, the order of dancers tends to shift. Some dancers will use a handkerchief called a yālikhtā (Syriac: ܝܵܠܸܚܬܵܐ, lit. 'handkerchief, bandana'), where noise is made as it's moved in the air during dancing. Performing dances such as sheikhani (Note: Many different types of sheikhani are performed; one of the most well known is Sheikani Yaqoora, also known as Bagiye) and others is often also used as a larger expression of Assyrian culture and identity.

Before going to the church for the wedding ceremony, it's common for families to gather in front of the bride's house and perform dances/music. The zurna and davul are the instruments used during this celebration, though in recent years, modern instruments and sounds are used in performing music. As the groom and bride enter the wedding reception hall, the zaffa is also performed. Assyrian folk-pop music is often performed at wedding celebrations, though Arabic and other different types of music are also performed. Wedding songs represent the spirit of celebrations, prosperity and happiness for the new couple.

When planning Assyrian weddings, various popular inner-community singers will be booked to perform for the newly wedded couple and guests. Artists such as Linda George have utilized weddings as a form of symbolism towards wishes and hopes for better times, such as in her song "Barwar". Musicians will often be selected depending on the geographic origins and dialects of Assyrian communities, given varying popularity between communities.

Among some families, guests can be seen wearing traditional Assyrian clothing during celebrations.

== Geographic traditions ==
Assyrians from Hakkari traditionally performed raweh during weddings, alluding to historic village life and markers of cultural identity which are still performed to this day. A tradition is also unique to Hakkari Assyrians known as Gablana (Syriac: ܓܒܠܵܢܵܐ), a parallel to the Tree of life where a tree branch is decorated with fruits and sugar that would be auctioned to wedding guests.

Among Assyrians from Al-Hasakah, a tradition took place where if one of the families refused the marriage, the family would be hosted by another family until the wedding could take place in the church. Once word had reached back that the marriage would take place, there would either be forgiveness and calm or conflicts, sometimes ending in killings.

Assyrians in Midyat have different culinary traditions for weddings. A unique engagement ceremony, sometimes known as Yamino (Syriac: ܝܰܡܺܝܢܳܐ), named after a special donut known as the yamino bun, is partaken after the successful engagement. The bun is broken into two pieces, and it is said that whoever has the bigger piece will be the head of the house. Wedding meals differ depending on the economic situation where the wedding takes place, but can include dishes such as stuffed ribs, börek, and kavurma. During the wedding meal (known as the sabahiye, which takes place the day after the wedding), arriving guests are offered "marga", a meal that includes lavash with meat cooked in broth. The sabahiye is one of the trends that are slowly fading, and is nowadays a smaller gathering for the closest family members to discuss the wedding and eat leftovers.

Eastern Assyrians have a custom where before the bride enters the bridegroom's house, she stops at the front door and dips her finger in butter, making the sign of the cross on the frame. This is said to bring happiness and wealth to the newlywed couple.

== Bibliography ==
- Davidson, Jane W.; Garrido, Sandra (19 March 2019). "Weddings". Music, Nostalgia and Memory. Springer. pp. 232–234. doi:10.1007/978-3-030-02556-4. ISBN 9783030025564.
- Eroğlu, Erol (Summer 2012). Sarica, Neşe (ed.). "MİDYAT SÜRYANİLERİNİN DÜĞÜN GELENEKLERİ" [THE WEDDING TRADITIONS OF ASSYRIANS IN MIDYAT]. Journal of Turkish Studies (in Turkish). 7 (3): 1189–1199.
- Ozer, Cagla (19 December 2019). "A monographic research on the Assyrian culinary culture in Turkey". Journal of Ethnic Foods. 6 (26) 26: 1–7. doi:10.1186/s42779-019-0036-0.
- Naby, Eden; Travis, Hannibal (19 July 2017). "Abduction, rape, and genocide: Urmia's Assyrian girls and women". The Assyrian Genocide: Cultural and Political Legacies (1st ed.). London: Routledge. ISBN 9781315269832.
- Toma, Shivan Shlaymoon (25 February 2025). "Assyrian Heritage". The Handbook of Iraqi People's Heritage. Institute of Development Studies. doi:10.19088/IDS.2024.043. ISBN 9781804702550.
- Woźniak-Bobińska, Marta (2018). "Big fat Assyrian/Syriac weddings: rituals and marriage traditions among Middle Eastern Christians in Sweden". Journal of Ethnic and Migration Studies. 44 (16). Łódź: University of Lodz: 2684–2700. doi:10.1080/1369183X.2017.1389036.
- Younan, Nadia (21 April 2020) [1 December 2019]. "Stateless Rhythms, Transnational Steps: Embodying the Assyrian Nation through Sheikhani Song and Dance". Revue Européenne des Migrations Internationales. 35 (4). Université de Poitiers: 41–62. doi:10.4000/remi.13344. eISSN 1777-5418. ISBN 979-10-90426-65-8. ISSN 0765-0752.
- Younan, Nadia (November 2023). Shaking the Ground: Intersections of Cultural Trauma, Collective Memory, and Resilience in Assyrian Popular Music and Dance (Thesis). University of Toronto.
