= Journal of Human Evolution =

- Discipline: Evolutionary biology, anthropology, archaeology
- Language: English
- Edited by: Radu Iovita, Nohemi Sala, Song Xing

Publication details
- History: 1972-present
- Publisher: Elsevier
- Frequency: Monthly
- Open access: Hybrid
- Impact factor: 3.1 (2024)

Standard abbreviations
- ISO 4: J. Hum. Evol.

Indexing
- ISSN: 0047-2484 (print); 1095-8606 (web)
- LCCN: 72623558
- OCLC no.: 1063743403

Links
- Journal homepage; Online archive

The Journal of Human Evolution (abbreviated as JHE) is a monthly peer-reviewed scientific journal that concentrates on publishing the highest quality papers covering all aspects of human evolution. JHE was established in 1972 by Academic Press in the United Kingdom and is currently published by Elsevier. The central focus of JHE is aimed jointly at paleoanthropological work, covering human and primate fossils, and at comparative studies of living species, including both morphological and molecular evidence. These include descriptions of new discoveries, analyses and interpretations of new and previously described material, and assessments of the phylogeny and paleobiology of primate species. In addition to original research papers, space is allocated for the rapid publication of short communications on new discoveries, such as exciting new fossils, as well as lead book reviews, obituaries and review papers of exceptionally high quality.

== Editorial Board resignation (2024) and continuation ==
The editors-in-chief were Andrea B. Taylor (Touro University California, USA) and Mark W. Grabowski (Liverpool John Moores University, England). In December, 2024, the editorial board, including emeritus editors and all but one associate editor, resigned, citing actions by Elsevier that they said "are fundamentally incompatible with the ethos of the journal and preclude maintaining the quality and integrity fundamental to JHE's success". Reasons cited by the editors included Elsevier's elimination of a dedicated copy editor position, forced restructuring of the editorial board, and use of generative AI without informing either editors or authors. This use of AI introduced formatting errors, including reintroducing formatting errors that had already been previously corrected by the editors. The resigning editors also noted that JHE charges significantly more to publish than most other journals, including other Elsevier journals. The publisher replied in a note signed by Joe d'Angelo (publishing director of Elsevier), acknowledging the disagreements but noting that they "have not determined the journal's topic coverage nor the selection of Associate Editors." The journal continues to be published under a new editorial team led by Radu Iovita (New York University, USA), Nohemi Sala (National Centre for Research on Human Evolution (CENIEH), Burgos, Spain), and Song Xing (Institute of Vertebrate Paleontology and Paleoanthropology, Beijing, China). The new editors announced several changes in the peer-review and editorial policies, notably the move to a two-review system, while also promising to keep the general profile and editorial outlook of the journal.

== Abstracting and indexing ==
The journal is abstracted and indexed in:

- Biological Abstracts
- BIOSIS Previews
- Current ContentsLife Sciences
- Current Contents/Social & Behavioral Sciences
- EMBiology
- Science Citation Index
- Social Sciences Citation Index
- Scopus
- The Zoological Record

== See also ==
- List of Elsevier periodicals
- List of anthropology journals
