= Iain R. Edgar =

British social anthropologist (1948–2021)

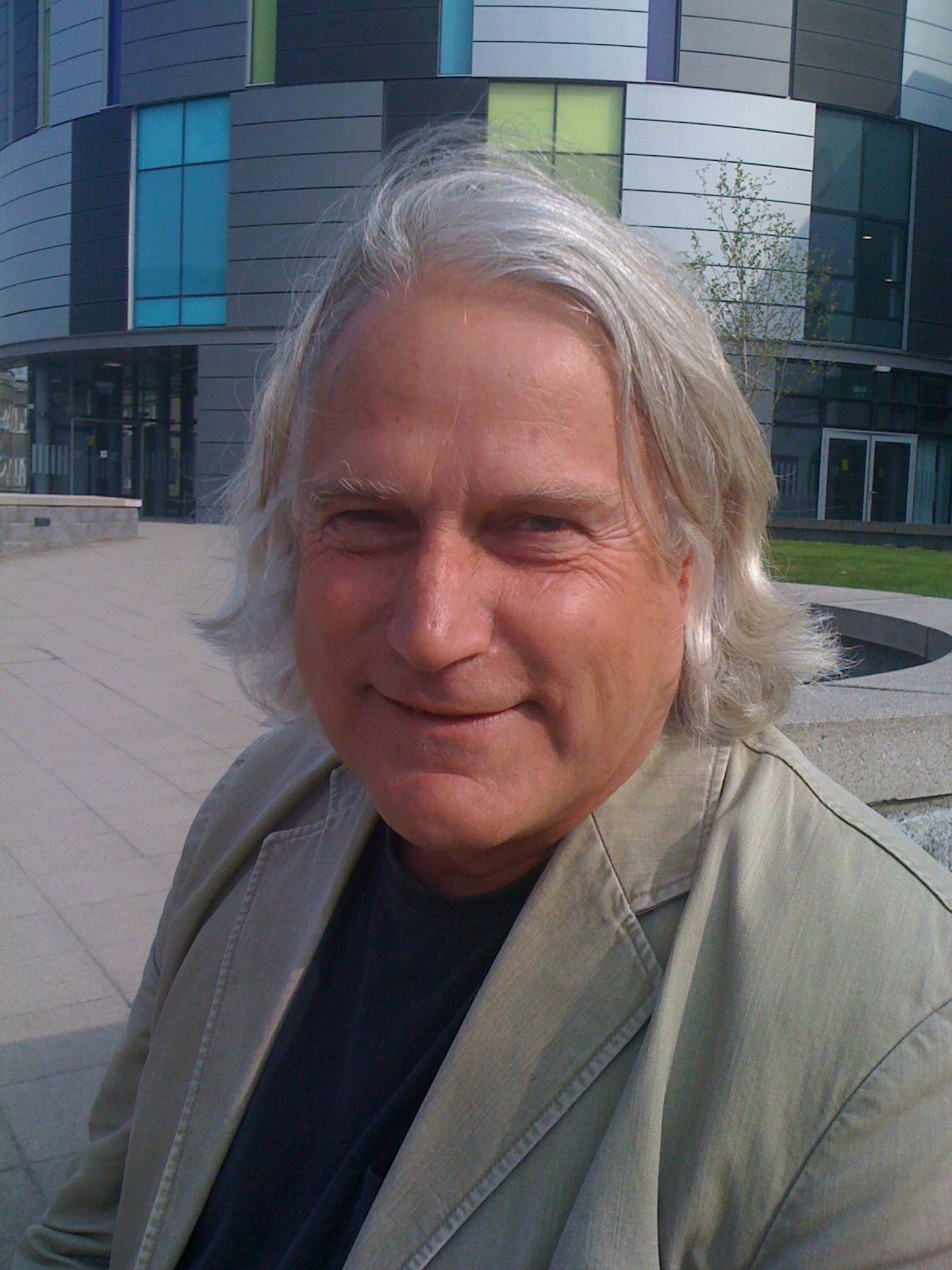
- Born: Iain Ross Edgar; 6 June 1948; Southend-on-Sea, Essex, England
- Died: 22 May 2021 (aged 72)
- Education: University of York; Durham University; Keele University
- Known for: Imagework, Anthropology of Dreams, Dreams and Islam, Anthropology of Education
- Children: 2

Iain Ross Edgar (6 June 1948 – 22 May 2021) was an English social anthropologist at Durham University. He was an expert in the field of dreams and dreaming, and a specialist in altered states of consciousness and mental health. Starting his career in social work, Edgar received a PhD from the University of Keele, where he studied under Ronnie Frankenberg. His thesis Dreamwork, Anthropology and the Caring Professions: A Cultural Approach to Dreamwork discusses a wide range of psychodynamic possibilities and develops a method to work with dreams within a professional care environment.

== Early life ==
Edgar was born in Southend-on-Sea to parents Fred, a dentist, and Margery (née White). Edgar went to boarding school at Bedford School and subsequently took a gap year to hitchhike. He studied philosophy at the University of York, graduating in 1970. He trained in social work, practiced in Aberdeen, and lectured at Northumbria University. He would then switch his focus to anthropology, going on to complete a Master of Philosophy (MPhil) at Durham University in 1986 and a PhD at Keele University in 1995.

== Career ==
Edgar was a pioneer in the area of imagework methods. In his 2004 book, A Guide to Imagework: Imagination-Based Research Methods (Routledge), he identifies several techniques for producing data about identity, belief and society through the exploration of people's imaginative resources.

Beginning in 2002, Edgar researched the role and function of the dream in Islam. He focussed on Sufi dreaming, Istikhara. In 2011, he published The Dream In Islam: From Qur'anic Tradition to Jihadist Interpretation. This book contributes to the understanding of the importance of dreams within both textual Islam and in every day Muslim life. Edgar extended his analysis to contribute to a better understanding of the ways that jihadi groups used dreams to justify and determine specific actions. Edgar argued that Islamic State fighters relied, at least in part, on dreams as a window into the future, and to help them make decisions when they lacked complete information.

Edgar published on education in social anthropology in Europe as well as broader primary and secondary education in Pakistan. With Stephen M. Lyon, he edited a book on education in Pakistan which covered secular, religious, state and private educational settings (see Lyon and Edgar 2010). He co-edited two volumes on education in social anthropology. The first, with Dorle Dracklé and Thomas K. Schippers, concentrated on the history of education in social anthropology, while the second, co-edited with Dorle Dracklé, addresses contemporary practices in teaching social anthropology in Europe.

== Personal life ==
Edgar had two children with his ex-wife Anna. He retired to his home in Alum Waters, where he was neighbours with Gwynned de Looijer.

== Selected publications ==
=== As author ===
- Edgar, Iain 2011. The Dream in Islam: From Qur'anic Tradition to Jihadist Inspiration. Oxford: Berghahn Books.
- Edgar, I.R. 2004. Guide to Imagework: Imagination-Based Research Methods. London: Routledge.
- Iain R. Edgar 1995. Dreamwork, Anthropology and the Caring Professions: A Cultural Approach to Dreamwork. Aldershopt: Avebury.

=== As editor ===
- Lyon, Stephen M. & Edgar, Iain R. 2010. Shaping a Nation: An Examination of Education in Pakistan. Karachi: Oxford University Press.
- Drackle, D. & Edgar, I.R. 2004. Learning Fields Vol.2 Current Educational Practices in European Social Anthropology. Oxford: Berghahn Books.
- D. Drackle, I. Edgar & T. Schippers 2003. Learning Fields Vol. 1 Educational Histories of European Anthropology. Oxford: Berghahn Books.
- Iain R. Edgar & A. Russell 1998. Anthropology of Welfare. London: Routledge.

=== Contributions ===
- Edgar, Iain R. 2009. A Comparison of Islamic and Western Psychological Dream Theories, in Bulkeley, K., Adams, K. & Davis, P., Dreaming in Christianity and Islam: Culture, Conflict, and Creativity (New Brunswick, USA.: Rutgers) 188–199
- Iain Edgar & David Henig 2009. The Cosmopolitan and the Noumenal: A Case Study of Islamic Jihadist Night Dreams as Reported Sources of Spiritual and Political Inspiration, in Theodossopoulos, Dimitrios Kirtsoglou, Elisabeth, United in Discontent: Local Responses to Cosmopolitanism and Globalization. (Oxford: Berghahn Books) 64–82
- I.R. Edgar 2004, Imagework in Ethnographic Research, in S. Pink, L. Kurti & A. Afonso, Working Images; research and representation in ethnography. (London: Routledge) 90–106
- Edgar, I. R 2004, Imagework method and potential applications in health, social sciences and social care research: journeying with a question, in Rapport, F, New Qualitative Research Methodologies in Health and Social Care Research (London: Routledge) 123–138
- I.R. Edgar 2003, Line-ups, in P.Rice & D.McCurdy Prentice Hall, Strategies for Teaching Anthropology Vol 3. 1–4.
- Edgar, Iain R. 1996, The tooth butterfly: rendering a sensible account from the imaginative present, in A James, J Hockey & A Dawson London After Writing Culture (London: Routledge) 71–85.

=== Journal articles ===
- Edgar, Iain R. & Henig, David. 2010. Istikhara: The Guidance and practice of Islamic dream incubation through ethnographic comparison. History and Anthropology 21(3): 251–262.
- Iain Edgar 2008. Overtures of Paradise: Night Dreams and Islamic Jihadist Militancy. Curare: Journal of Medical Anthropology 31(1): 87–97.
- Edgar, Iain R. 2007. The Inspirational Night Dream in the Motivation and Justification of Jihad. Nova Religio 11(2): 59–76.
- Edgar, Iain R. 2006. The ‘true dream’ in contemporary Islamic/Jihadist dreamwork: a case study of the dreams of Taliban leader Mullah Omar.

Contemporary South Asia 15(3): 263–272

- Iain Edgar 2004. A War of Dreams? Militant Muslim Dreaming in the Context of Traditional and Contemporary Islamic Dream Theory and Practice. Dreaming 14(1): 21–29
- Edgar, Iain R. 2003. Encountering the dream: intersecting Anthropological and Psychoanalytical Approaches. Counselling and Psychotherapy Research 3(2): 95–101.
- Edgar, Iain R. 2002. Invisible Elites: Authority and the Dream. Dreaming 12(1): 79–92.
- Edgar, Iain R. 2000. Cultural dreaming or dreaming cultures? The anthropologist and the dream. KEA: Zeitscrift fur Kulturwissenschaften 13: 1–20.
- Edgar, Iain R. 1999. Dream Fact and Real Fiction: The Realisation of the Imagined Self. Anthropology of Consciousness 10(1): 28–42.
- Edgar, Iain R. 1999. The Imagework Method in Social Science and Health Research. Qualitative Health Research 9(2): 198–211.
