= Bible moralisée =

Fully illustrated royal medieval Bibles

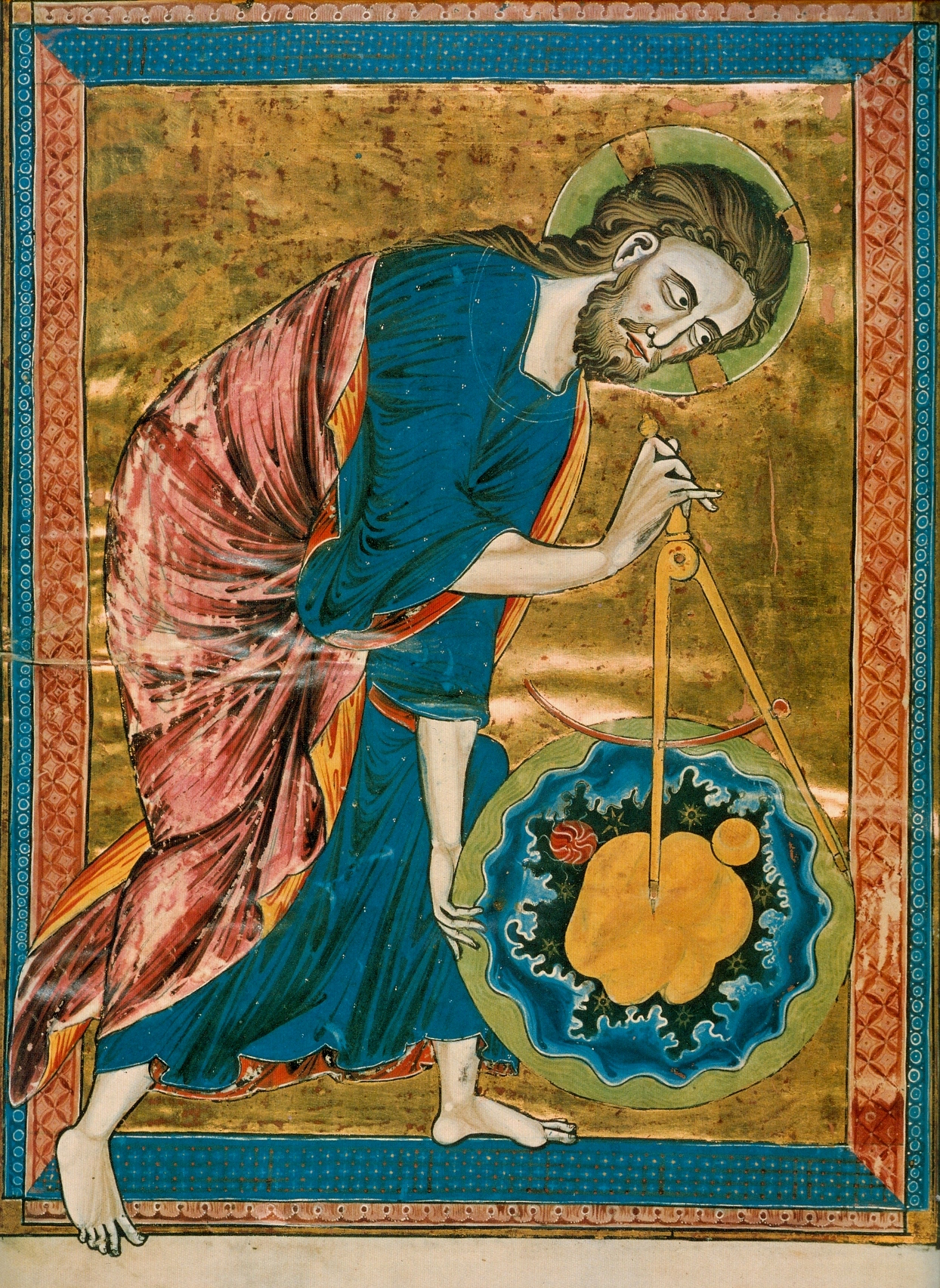
Prefatory miniature from a moralized Bible of "God as architect of the world", folio I verso, Paris ca. 1220–1230. Ink, tempera, and gold leaf on vellum 1' 1½" × 8¼". Osterreichische Nationalbibliothek, Vienna 2554. God shapes the universe with the aid of a compass. Within the perfect circle already created are the spherical sun and moon and the unformed matter that will become the earth once God applies the same geometric principles to it. A view of the earth influenced by Ancient Greek Geometry and icons of the Eastern Orthodox Church.

The Bible moralisée, also known as the "Bible Historiée", the "Bible Allégorisée" and sometimes "Emblémes Bibliques", is a later name for the most important examples of the medieval picture bibles, called in general "biblia pauperum", to have survived. They are heavily illustrated, and extremely expensive, illuminated manuscripts of the thirteenth century, and from the copies that still survive it is clear that they existed in at least two versions with different contents. They were similar in the choice and order of the Biblical texts selected, but differed in the allegorical and moral deductions drawn from these passages.

Though large, the manuscripts only contained selections of the text of the Bible, along with commentary and illustrations. Each page pairs Old and New Testament episodes with illustrations explaining their moral significance in terms of typology.

There are seven surviving fully illustrated manuscripts of the Bible moralisée group; all date from the thirteenth to the fifteenth centuries and were designed for the personal use of the French royal family. Four were created in the early thirteenth century, when church art dominated the decorative arts. As common in stained glass and other Gothic art of the time, the illustrations are framed within medallions. The text explained the theological and moral meanings of the text. Many artists were involved in the creation of each of the Bibles moralisées, and their identities and shares of the work remain unclear.

== Background ==
In the European Middle Ages the Catholic church made use of pictures as a means of instruction, to supplement the knowledge acquired by reading or oral teaching. Books only existed in manuscript form and, being extremely costly, were beyond the means of most people. Hardly anyone could read, outside the ranks of the clergy and the monks. So frescoes of scenes from the Old and New Testaments, stained-glass windows, and the like were set up in the churches, because, as the Synod of Arras (1025) said, "The illiterate contemplated in the lineaments of painting what they, having never learnt to read, could not discern in writing".

Pictures spread abroad a knowledge of the events recorded in the Bible and of the mutual connection between the leading facts of the Old and New Testaments, whether as type and antitype, or as prophecy and fulfillment. For this purpose the picture Bibles of the Middle Ages were copied and put in circulation. Parts of these go back to the eleventh and twelfth centuries.

The Bibles moralisées were created to interpret and explain scripture. A broad didactic movement in the first half of the thirteenth century was one that placed an importance on pictures teaching morality. The Bible moralisées was part of this movement and attempted to do just that. Both the depiction and text must be read because the images hold an interpretation of the world or moment in history, and details within the images hold symbolic meaning.

The manuscripts were for private use, specifically the Bibles moraliées were designed to teach the French kings. The second of the Bible manuscripts, Vienna 1179, may have been written in Latin for the purpose of teaching Louis VIII.

== Description ==
The entire work contains about 5,000 illustrations. The pictures are arranged in two parallel columns on each page, each column having four medallions with pictures. Parallel to the pictures and alternating with them are two other narrower columns, with four legends each, one legend to each picture; the legends consisting alternatively of Biblical texts and moral or allegorical applications; whilst the pictures represent the subjects of the Biblical texts or of the applications of them. A specimen of the second edition of the "Bible Moralisée" is to be found in the Bibliothèque nationale de France (MS. Français No. 167). It contains the same selection and order of the Biblical passages, but it differs in the greater simplicity and brevity of the moral and allegorical teaching based on them. Another important Bible, intended to instruct by means of pictures, was that which has been called the "Bible Historiée toute figurée". It was a work of the end of the thirteenth or the beginning of the fourteenth century. In general outline and plan it resembles the others, but it differs from it in the selection of Bible passages and in the allegorical explanations derived from them. In life of Christ, the author of the "Bible Historiée toute figurée" dispensed with a written text altogether, and contented himself with writing a brief explanatory legend over the pictures depicting scenes of Christ's life.

The article “The Iconography of Theophilus Windows in the First Half of the Thirteenth Century” by Cothren compares the Bibles moralisées with Theophilus Windows because both have a didactic idea to use pictures to explain ideas regarding morals as well as to juxtapose scenes from the old and new testament. The difference is that stained glass art and the Theophilus Windows are created for public viewing while the Bibles moralisées were not. Both the Theophilus Windows and the Bibles moralisées are a part of a didactic movement, wherein pictures are relied upon to teach morality.

== The Four Early Bibles moralisées ==
The best known copy of the first version is one of the most sumptuous illustrated manuscripts preserved to us from the Middle Ages. It no longer as a single volume; it has been split up into three separate parts kept in three libraries. The first part, consisting of 224 leaves, is in the Bodleian Library at Oxford. The second part of 222 leaves is in the Bibliothèque nationale de France in Paris; and the third part, made up of 178 leaves, is kept in the British Library. Six leaves of the third part are missing, so that it ought to contain 184 leaves. When complete and bound together, therefore, the whole volume consisted of 630 leaves, written and illustrated on one side only.

The Oxford-Paris-London manuscripts consist of 3 volumes and artists had left evidence in their work of working under time pressure. The Oxford-Paris-London Bible was the most accessible through publication for five decades in the 20th century.

Vienna 2554 made it to the Imperial Library in Vienna in 1783. It is the most familiar of the Bibles. It has a frontispiece that is one of the most reproduced images of the Middle Ages. This manuscript is the most accessible to scholars from all the Bibles moralisées, this is due to an exceptional facsimile that has been published in full colour. This facsimile was published in three thousand copies at its original size in 1973. As well, the facsimile has been republished (first in 1992 and again in 1995) twice at half the size of the original. These publications have allowed the wide exchange of Vienna 2554. The second of the Bibles is also in Vienna, its codex is 1179, and it is less accessible than Vienna 2554 through publication. Some evidence shows that Vienna 1179 was a rethought version of what was first created in Vienna 2554; this reverses the usual connection that is made between the two.

Because of the close relations between France and Spain in the 13th century, there appeared several moralized Bibles in Spain at this time. One complete version, similar to that described above, is the St. Louis Bible. It was copied and illustrated between 1226 and 1234 in Paris on the orders of Blanche of Castile for her son Louis IX, who gave it to Alfonso X of Castile; it remains in good condition in the Cathedral of Toledo. The three volumes are exhibited in the Cathedral Treasury, making this 3 volume bible the easiest of all the bibles moralisées for any visitor to see, but yet it was also the most difficult for a scholar to be allowed to study. The number of requests the cathedral Chapter received from scholars seeking direct access to the Bible of St Louis in order to study and conduct research on a great many subjects, increased every day, so eventually the Chapter decided to produce a facsimile edition of the Bible of St Louis. After approaching different publishing houses, the project was finally entrusted to M. Moleiro Editor in Barcelona and since 2006 a complete facsimile edition is available.

There was also the Spanish Biblia moralizada (Biblioteca nacional de Madrid 10232) from the late 14th century, which contains independently translated passages and glosses, though it has few illuminations.

== The later Bibles moralisées ==
Of the seven Bibles moralisées only one, manuscript Français 167 in the Bibliothèque nationale de France in Paris, has survived in its complete form. Français 167 can be traced almost without a break from its creation in Paris for King John II of France in 1349-52 up until now. The sixth of the Bibles moralisées is known now as MS Additional 18719 in the British Library, is the least known of the seven, and is the work of well known late thirteenth-century English artist. Français 166 is the last of the seven fully illustrated Bibles moralisées.

== Date and Locations ==
Historians still dispute the time, place and the intended readers of the first two bibles moralisées, though consensus seems to believe that they were created during the first three decades of the thirteenth century in Paris.

== The theories behind the commissioning of the Bibles moralisées ==
1. One theory is that Vienna 2554 was written between 1208 and 1215, commissioned by Phillip II Augustus, for his son, Louis VIII or his bride. Others have dated the manuscript later, to either the decade 1215-1225 or the decade 1220-1230. A point of reference for the dating of Vienna 2554 is the image of a mature looking bearded king at the end of Vienna 1179. This image was probably created before 1226 when Louis IX succeeded his father. There is some consensus that Vienna 1179 was made shortly after Vienna 2554.
2. An accepted theory regarding Toledo is that it was created on the orders of Blanche of Castile for Louis IX, this may be in connection to his marriage to Marguerite of Provence in 1234 majorite.
3. Oxford-Paris-London was probably also created on orders of Blanche of Castile for a related circumstance during approximately the same time period. Due to the fact that organization for Louis` marriage began in 1233 this may be the time period when this manuscript was started.
4. There is debate as to whether MS Additional 18719 (Add. 18719) was created at the end of the thirteenth century or the beginning of the fourteenth.
5. Français 166 came to be in the royal collection by 1518, how it got there remains unknown, though it has been theorized that Aymar of Poitiers may have given manuscripts to King Charles VIII while he was serving in Provence.

== The Artists of the Bibles moralisées ==
In the Bibles moralisées all the artists who worked on the manuscripts could not be identified, at times the number of artists who worked on a manuscript could be distinguished. For example, in the Add. 18719 manuscript, the illustrations were created by a number of craftsmen with speed and sloppiness, borders are completed crudely and in freehand. Meanwhile, in Français 167 fifteen artists were distinguished. Français 166 is different in this regard, because some of the artists were identified. Three of the five artists of Français166 were identified, including young Master of the Psalter of Jeanne de Laval, Maitre de Jouvenel, and the Master of the Geneva Boccaccio. These artists did not work at the same time but rather picking up where the one before stopped. There is a possible connection between the Limbourg brothers in 1402 -1404 and the illustrations within Français 166 first three quires.

=== Technical analysis ===
In the four early Bibles moralisées, only one side of each page of parchment was used; this procedure increased the size of the volume as well as made the creation of these bibles very expensive. Unlike the earlier Bibles moralisées, Add. 18719 and other later Bibles moralisées used both sides of the parchment, hence costs as well as size of the manuscript was decreased. This change allowed for a more convenient one volume manuscript. Although this change may signal that money was a factor when creating later manuscripts.

The text/picture blocks in the Bibles Moralisées are striking for their symmetry. Each of the pages hold 8 medallions with painted gold backgrounds, these 8 medallions are arranged in pairs, so 4 rows of two medallions. Where the medallions touch one another a stylized flower joins the two, similar flowers mark where the medallions touch the outer frame and the spaces between the medallions are decorated using squares placed over quatrefoils, in these there are painted angel busts over a gold ground. Each of the paintings within the medallions held figures that were painted on a gold leaf background, and are set on a patterned ground of blue or rose brown.

As an example, in BnF MS Français 9561 129 pages are taken up with the Old Testament. Of these the earlier ones are divided horizontally in the centre, and it is the upper part of the page that contains the picture illustrative of some Old Testament event. The lower part represents a corresponding scene from the New Testament. further on in the volume, three pictures appear in the upper part of the page, and three below. Seventy-six pages at the end of the volume are devoted to depicting the lives of Jesus Christ and the Blessed Virgin.

In most of the Bibles moralisées, evidence shows that scribes completed the text after the decorations were completed. The text supplemented the images, being similar to a caption. This can be seen most obviously where the text goes over the gilding or the borders that had been painted for the text to fit in. A difference between MS Additional 18719 and the earlier Bibles moralisées is that MS Additional 18719 followed the usual procedure for manuscript illumination, where the scribes worked first and then the artists added images.

Français 166 copies the layout and text that is used in Français 167. Meanwhile, Vienna 1179 and Toledo are very similar, at times the two be told apart in photographs, since they consist of the same layout. Français 167 is similar to Add. 18719 in that unlike the other Bibles moralisées they both sides of the parchment sheets.

=== State of preservation ===
Almost all of the manuscripts dated to the medieval period have been rebound. For example, Add. 18719 was rebound in modern times the stitching of the new binding is characteristic of the tight stitch technique that was used by the British Museum in the second half of the nineteenth century.

Vienna 1179 was badly damaged by water at an early date; the damage was not equal to all pages but sufficient to require the rewriting of all the texts positioned in the upper part of the affected pages. This rewriting can be witnessed in that the scribe who restored the texts on Ruth was not the original scribe, his work was not angular and appeared more the inscriptions used in Toledo pr Oxford-Paris London, two other bibles of the bibles moralisées, hence this damage was caused after the manuscript was completed.

Français 167 went through an early restoration, due to extensive water damage. Three sides of the parchment leaves had been cut off in the majority of the book and replacements strips were glued on, also the text was inked again in certain places that had been affected by the replacement strips. The images that were replaced were created to imitate the originals and have been identified as having been completed by a master working for King Charles V around 1370-1380.

Even the parts of Français 166 that survived were never fully completed. All the aspects of Français 166, such as the headers, drawing of the frames, paintings etc., are all in different stages of completion at different points in the manuscript. Add. 18719 was entirely illustrated using drawings, this brings up questions about whether it was left unfinished.

=== Style ===
One of the artist who illustrated Add. 18719, identified only as artist E, used exceptional skills in his drawings. His figures were tall and thin with elongated necks. The figures are clothed in drapery that hangs and shows heavy angular folds. The heads sit at odd angles on the necks, often tilted sharply. The figures have broad foreheads and small chins. This artist’s work was compared to the Ashridge Comestor, British Library, MS Royal 3.D.VI, which is a different manuscript. The style used by artist E is reminiscent of the Carolingian Rheims School of art. The Rheims school also used elongated figures, with long necks and figures. The heads of some of the sketches also sit peculiarly on the shoulders and draperies in which the figures are clothed also have angular folds. The Rheims school of art produced art that gave much feeling of motion.

The early Bibles moralisées are an example of the move away from the Byzantine influences, this movement is part of the early gothic art movement. The early gothic style lasted until the middle of the thirteenth century and is characterized by a softer and more realistic style than the Byzantine influenced style. “In France the style is particularly noticeable in a series of magnificent Bibles Moralisées ... done probably for the French court c. 1230–40.”

=== Iconography ===
The Vienna 2554 frontispiece is famous and has often been reproduced. This frontispiece shows God`s figure bent while in the work of creation. “There is no close iconographic antecedent for this image.” In this image God is utilizing a huge pair of compasses, which are carefully balanced so as to draw and define. God’s left hand seems to be in the process of putting the disk that is the cosmos into motion. In a broadly read study of Gothic architecture by Otto Von Simpson, this image is titled “The Creator as Architect,” this theme has been important from Plato and onward. Yet the meaning of this frontispiece has been widely debated. Vienna 1179 also has a full page creator image. In this image God is seated on a backless throne and he is holding the orb of the universe in his lap. With his right hand he turns the compasses. In this image he is enclosed within a rectangular frame by a mandorla supported at the corners by four flying angels. This idea of god as a creator, with images of god holding compasses has been reproduced in several of the Bibles moralisées and many debates have surrounded the meaning and origin of this idea.

=== Codicological Information ===
The Bibles moralisées were created on high quality parchment. Each of the bibles was one of the most expensive books that had been created within medieval Europe. All of the bibles were created on large sheets of high- quality parchment in which the work was only done on one side of each parchment. Expensive paint and ink was used in the creation of the Bibles moralisées as well, for example the blue that was used for the borders, backgrounds, and clothes was lapis lazuli. Few held the resources to commission these works other than royalty. In each page of the Bibles moralisées there are eight images arranged within four columns. Each is a biblical and moralizing image that is accompanied by a text. Unlike most illuminated manuscripts where the images are secondary to the text, in these manuscripts the images are the dominant aspect, this is evident in that the manuscripts contain more than 24,000 illustrations.

== Folios ==
Vienna 2554 now stands apart from the other Bibles moralisées as noticeably the smallest, consisting of 131 folios. The damage and disorder of the pages now leave little evidence of the original length of the volume. Meanwhile, Vienna 1179 is almost two times the thickness of Vienna 2554, consisting of 246 folios. MS Additional 18719 now consists of 311 folios, while the original total was 321 folios and 642 pages. Français 167 is a single volume and it contains 322 numbered folios. Lastly, Français 166 consists of one volume and 169 folios, containing 1,340 illustrations.

== Other illustrated Bibles ==
There is a MS. existing in the British Museum (addit. 1577) entitled "Figures de la Bible" consisting of pictures illustrating events in the Bible with short descriptive text. This is of the end of the thirteenth, or the beginning of the fourteenth, century. Of the same date is the "Historia Bibliæ metrice" which is preserved in the same library and, as the name implies, has a metrical text. The Velislai biblia picta is a 14th-century Bohemian picture bible.

There are specimens of manuscript illustrated Bibles of earlier date. Examples are the Bible preserved in the library of the Basilica of Saint Paul Outside the Walls, Rome; that of the Amiens Library (MS. 108), and that of the Royal Library of The Hague (MS. 69).

== Sources ==
Attribution

- De Laborde, A., Comte de. 1911-1913. La Bible Moralisée Illustrée Conservée à Oxford, Paris, et Londres. Paris.
- Cothren, Michael. 1984. "The Iconography of Theophilus Windows in the First Half of the Thirteenth Century", Speculum 59, (2), JSTOR
- Greenspoon, “The Making of the Bibles Moralisées”. Review of the Making of the Bibles Moralisées, by Lowden, John, Theological Studies, 2001, p. 607.
- Hinkle, William. Gothic art and architecture. 2000 [cited 03/12 2012], Available from here
- Lowden, John. 2000. The making of the bibles moralisées : The Manuscripts. Vol. 1. United States of America: The Pennsylvania State University.
- Martindale, Andrew. "Western painting: Early gothic", Encyclopædia Britannica Online Academic Edition, subscription required link
- Tachau, Katherine. 1998, God's compass and vana curiositas: Scientific study in the old french bible moralisée, The Art Bulletin 80, (1), JSTOR
- J. Théry, « Luxure cléricale, gouvernement de l’Église et royauté capétienne au temps de la "Bible de saint Louis" », Revue Mabillon, 25, 2014, p. 165-194, en ligne.
