= Chris Stringer =

British physical anthropologist (b. 1947)

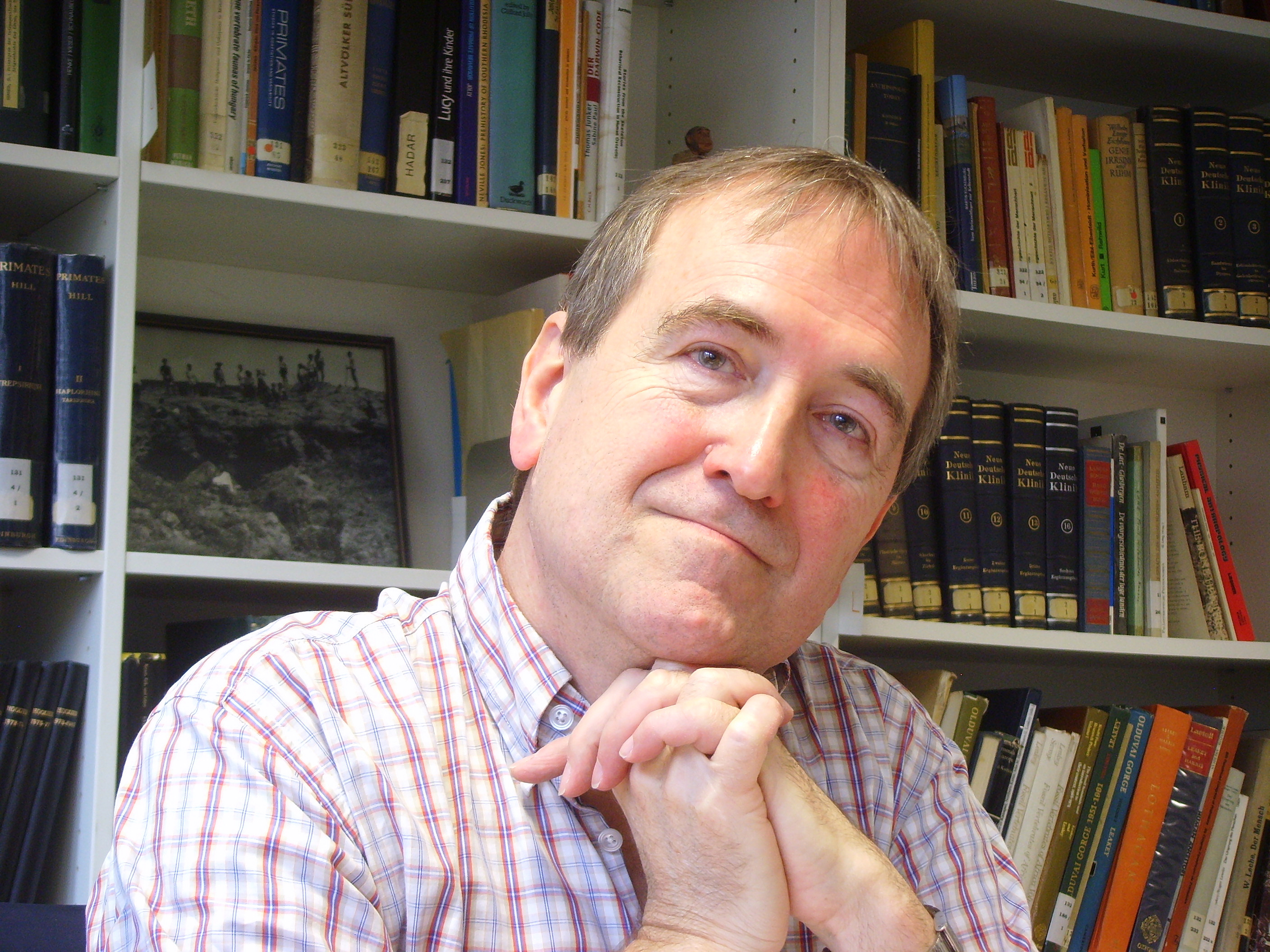
- Stringer in 2012
- Born: London, United Kingdom
- Education: University College London; Bristol University
- Scientific career
- Workplaces: Natural History Museum, London
- Thesis: A multivariate study of cranial variation in middle and upper Pleistocene human populations (1974)
- Doctoral advisor: Jonathan H. Musgrave

Christopher Brian Stringer CBE FRS is a British physical anthropologist noted for his work on human evolution.

== Biography ==
Growing up in a working-class family in the East End of London, Stringer first took an interest in anthropology during primary school, when he undertook a project on Neanderthals. Stringer studied anthropology at University College London, holds a PhD in Anatomical Science and a DSc in Anatomical Science (both from Bristol University).

Stringer joined the permanent staff of the Natural History Museum in 1973. He is currently Research Leader in Human Origins.

== Research ==
Stringer was previously one of the leading proponents of the recent African origin hypothesis or ″Out of Africa″ theory, which hypothesizes that modern humans originated in Africa over 100,000 years ago and replaced, in some way, the world's archaic humans, such as Homo floresiensis and Neanderthals, after migrating within and then out of Africa to the non-African world within the last 50,000 to 100,000 years. He always considered that some interbreeding between the different groups could have occurred, but thought this would have been trivial in the big picture. However, recent genetic data show that the replacement process did include some interbreeding. In the last decade he has proposed a more complex version of events within Africa, which he has termed ″multiregional African origin″.

He also directed the Ancient Human Occupation of Britain project which ran for about 10 years from 2001. This consortium reconstructed and studied the episodic pattern of human colonisation of Britain during the Pleistocene. He is co-director of the follow-up project "Pathways to Ancient Britain".

== Honours ==
He is a Fellow of the Royal Society and Honorary Fellow of the Society of Antiquaries. He won the 2008 Frink Medal of the Zoological Society of London and the Rivers Memorial Medal from the Royal Anthropological Institute in 2004.

He was elected a Member of the American Philosophical Society in 2019.

Stringer was appointed Commander of the Order of the British Empire (CBE) in the 2023 New Year Honours for services to the understanding of human evolution.

== Publications ==
=== Papers ===
- Stringer, Chris; Andrews, Peter (1988). "Genetic and Fossil Evidence for the Origin of Modern Humans". Science. 239 (4845): 1263–1268. Bibcode:1988Sci...239.1263S. doi:10.1126/science.3125610. PMID 3125610.
- Stringer, Chris (2002). "Modern human origins – progress and prospects". Philosophical Transactions of the Royal Society B. 357 (1420): 563–579. doi:10.1098/rstb.2001.1057. PMC 1692961. PMID 12028792.
- Stringer, Chris (2022). "The development of ideas about a recent African origin for Homo sapiens" (PDF). Journal of Anthropological Sciences. 100 (100): 5–18. doi:10.4436/jass.10009. PMID 36511798.

=== Books ===
- Stringer, Chris, ed. (1981). Aspects of human evolution: Symposium on human evolution, January 1980. London: Taylor & Francis. ISBN 0-85066-209-5.
- Stringer, Chris (1986). "The credibility of Homo habilis". In Wood, Bernard A.; Martin, Lawrence B.; Andrews, Peter (eds.). Major topics in primate and human evolution. Cambridge University Press. p. 266. ISBN 978-0-521-11338-0.
- Stringer, Chris (1989). "Neandertals, their contemporaries and modern human origins". In Giacobini, Giacomo (ed.). Hominidae: Proceedings of the 2nd International Congress of Human Paleontology. Turin, September 28 – October 3, 1987. Editoriale Jaca Book. pp. 351–356. ISBN 88-16-28026-3.
- Andrews, Peter; Stringer, Chris (1989). Human Evolution: An Illustrated Guide. Cambridge: Cambridge University Press. ISBN 0-521-38824-4.
- Mellars, Paul; Stringer, Chris, eds. (1989). The Human Revolution: Behavioural and Biological Perspectives on the Origins of Modern Humans. Princeton University Press. ISBN 978-0-691-08539-5.
- Stringer, Chris; McKie, Robin (1997). African Exodus. The Origins of Modern Humanity. New York: Henry Holt. ISBN 0-8050-2759-9.
- Stringer, Chris; Barton, R.N.E.; Finlayson, J.C., eds. (2000). Neanderthals on the Edge: Papers from a Conference Marking the 150th Anniversary of the Forbes' Quarry Discovery, Gibraltar. Oxford: Oxbow Books. ISBN 978-1-84217-015-1.
- "Introduction to the fiftieth anniversary edition of The Piltdown Forgery" (pp. vii–x | and "Afterword: Piltdown 2003" (pp. 188–201). In The Piltdown Forgery By J. S. Weiner (2003) Oxford: Oxford University Press. ISBN 0-19-860780-6
- Stringer, Chris; Andrews, Peter (2005). The Complete World of Human Evolution. London & New York: Thames & Hudson.. ISBN 0-500-05132-1
- Stringer, Chris (2007). Homo britannicus. The Incredible Story of Human Life in Britain. London: Penguin. ISBN 978-0-14-101813-3.
- Stringer, Chris (2011). The Origin of Our Species. London: Allen Lane. ISBN 978-1-84614-140-9., published in the United States in 2012 retitled as Lone Survivors: How We Came to Be the Only Humans on Earth. London: Times Books. 13 March 2012. ISBN 978-0805088915.

== See also ==
- Happisburgh footprints
