= Michelle P. Brown =

British academic (born 1959)

Michelle P. Brown FSA
- Born: 1 October 1959 (age 67)
- Known for: Lindisfarne Gospels
- Title: Lay Canon, Truro Cathedral Visiting Professor, UCL and Baylor Professor Emerita, SAS, UCL

Academic work
- Discipline: History, Manuscript Studies, Book History
- Institutions: School of Advanced Study; British Library; University College London; Baylor University
- Main interests: Archaeology, Cultural memory, Culture, History, History of art, History of the book, Irish Studies, Manuscript studies, Medieval History, Palaeography, Regional history
- Website: https://www.michellepbrown.com/

Michelle P. Brown FSA (born 1 October 1959) is professor emerita of Medieval Manuscript Studies at the School of Advanced Study, University of London. She was previously (1986–2004) Curator of Illuminated Manuscripts at the British Library. She has been a historical consultant and on-screen expert on several radio and television programmes. She has published books on Bede, the Lindisfarne Gospels, the Luttrell Psalter and the Holkham Bible.

Brown held the Sandars Readership in Bibliography in 2008–2009, speaking on "The book and the transformation of Britain, c. 550–1050".

== Books ==
=== As author ===
- A Guide to Western Historical Scripts from Antiquity to 1600. British Library & Toronto University Press: London & Toronto, 1990; rev. ed. 1994; 1999.
- Anglo-Saxon Manuscripts. British Library: London, 1991.
- Understanding Illuminated Manuscripts: A Glossary of Technical Terms. British Library and J. Paul Getty Museum: London & Malibu, 1994.
- The Book of Cerne: Prayer, Patronage and Power in Ninth-Century England. British Library & Toronto University Press: London & Toronto, 1996.
- The British Library Guide to Writing and Scripts: History and Techniques. British Library & Toronto University Press: London & Toronto, 1998.
- with Patricia Lovett, The British Library Historical Source-Book for Scribes. British Library & Toronto University Press: London & Toronto, 1999.
- The Lindisfarne Gospels: Society, Spirituality and the Scribe. British Library, Faksimile Verlag & Toronto University Press: London, Luzern & Toronto 2003.
- Painted Labyrinth: The World of the Lindisfarne Gospels. British Library: London, 2003.
- How Christianity Came to Britain and Ireland. Lion Hudson: Oxford, 2006. (Reader's Digest edition, 2007)
- St Paul's Cathedral. Jarrold: Norwich, 2006.
- The Luttrell Psalter: A facsimile with Accompanying Commentary. Folio Society & British Library: London, 2006.
- The World of the Luttrell Psalter. British Library: London, 2006.
- The Lion Companion to Christian Art. Lion Hudson: Oxford, 2008.
- Manuscripts from the Anglo-Saxon Age. British Library & Toronto University Press: London & Toronto, 2008.
- The Holkham Bible Picture-Book: A Facsimile with Accompanying Commentary, Transcription and Translation. Folio Society & British Library: London, 2008.
- The Lindisfarne Gospels and the Early Medieval World (2010)
- Art of the Islands: Celtic, Pictish, Anglo-Saxon and Viking Visual Culture, c. 450-1050. Bodleian Library, University of Oxford (2016)
- The Word and the Shaping of Cornwall before the Reformation. Francis Bootle: London, 2021
- Bede and the Theory of Everything. Reaktion Books, 2021

==== As Michelle Treeve ====
- Eadfrith: Scribe of Lindisfarne. Bagwyn Books, 2014

=== As editor ===
- J. Bately, M. P. Brown and J. Roberts, eds, A Palaeographer's View: Selected Writings of Julian Brown. Harvey Miller: London, 1991.
- M. P. Brown and L. Webster, eds, The Transformation of the Roman World. British Museum Press: London, 1997.
- M. P. Brown and S. McKendrick, eds, The Illuminated Book in the Later Middle Ages. Studies in Honour of Janet Backhouse. British Library & Toronto University Press: London & Toronto, 1997.
- M. P. Brown and C. Farr, eds, Mercia: An Anglo-Saxon Kingdom in Europe. Leicester University Press: Leicester, 2001.
- M. P. Brown and R. J. Kelly, eds, You're History: How People Make the Difference. Continuum: London, 2006.
- M. P. Brown, ed., In the Beginning: Bibles Before the Year 1000. Smithsonian Institution: Washington DC, 2006.
- Graphic Devices and the Early Decorated Book (Boydell Studies in Medieval Art and Architecture, 11). Boydell, 2017
