= M. Moleiro Editor =

Publishing house

- Type: Publishing house
- Industry: Publishing
- Founded: 1991
- Founder: Manuel Moleiro
- Products: Facsimile reproductions of codices, maps and illuminated manuscripts
- Website: moleiro.com

M. Moleiro Editor is a publishing house specialising in high-quality facsimile reproductions of codices, maps and illuminated manuscripts. Founded in Barcelona in 1991, the firm has reproduced many masterpieces from the history of illumination.

== Background ==
In 1976, whilst still a student, Manuel Moleiro created Ebrisa, a publishing house specialised in books on art, science and cartography which collaborated on a variety of joint enterprises with other publishers including Times Books, Encyclopædia Britannica, Macmillan, Edita, Imprimerie Nationale and Franco Maria Ricci.

In 1991, Moleiro decided to create a company with his own name and brand. Since then he has specialised in identical reproductions of some medieval and Renaissance bibliographic treasures, obtaining authorisation to do so from libraries and museums such as the Bibliothèque nationale de France, the British Library, the Morgan Library & Museum, the Metropolitan Museum, New York, the National Library of Russia, the Huntington Library and the Gulbenkian Foundation, Lisbon.

To certify this labour of cultural diffusion, each facsimile has a companion volume of studies by manuscript experts.

== Publishing activities ==
As a result of publishers applying the term "facsimile" to different types of reproduction of poor quality in recent decades, M. Moleiro Editor decided to label their codices "quasi-original" to reflect the accuracy of their reproductions. In 2010, the French newspaper Le Monde wrote, "The Spanish publishing house Moleiro has invented the "quasi original", a more appropriate term for describing the extremely painstaking artisan work involved in manufacturing these works which are more like clones than facsimiles". Indeed, no expense is spared in any of their editions to duplicate the texture, smell, thickness and variable density of paper and parchment, the gold in the miniatures, the leather bindings, and thread used to sew them. The resulting copies are therefore deemed to be clones and not merely reproductions.

All this publisher's editions are unique, first editions, limited to 987 numbered copies authenticated by notary public.

In 2001, The Times described the work of this publishing house as "The Art of Perfection". One year later in the same newspaper, Allegra Stratton wrote that "the Pope sleeps with one of Moleiro's quasi-originals by his bed".

== Landmark works reproduced by M. Moleiro Editor ==
M. Moleiro Editor has reproduced several works by Beatus of Liébana – the Cardeña Beatus, the Arroyo Beatus, the Silos Beatus, the Beatus of Ferdinand I and Sancha and the Girona Beatus – and also the three volumes of the Bible of Saint Louis, deemed to be the most important bibliographic monument of all time with a total of 4887 miniatures. Their catalogue also features many books of hours such as the Isabella Breviary, the Great Hours of Anne of Brittany and the Book of Hours of Joanna I of Castile; medicinal treatises such as the Book of Simple Medicines and Tacuinum Sanitatis and cartographic masterpieces such as the Miller Atlas and the Vallard Atlas.

== Complete list of "quasi-original" editions ==
- Beatus of Liébana, Codex of Ferdinand I and Sancha of Castille and León
- Beatus of Liébana, Gerona Codex
- Beatus of Liébana, Monastery of San Andrés de Arroyo
- Beatus of Liébana, Monastery of San Pedro de Cardeña
- Beatus of Liébana, Monastery of Santo Domingo de Silos
- Bible moralisée of Naples
- Bible of Saint Louis
- Book of Felicity
- Book of Hours of Charles VIII
- Book of Hours of Louis of Orleans
- Book of Hours of Maria of Navarre
- Book of Simple Medicines
- Book of Testaments
- Book of Treasures
- Catalan Mappa Mundi
- Christopher Columbus’s Chart
- Genealogy of Christ
- Grandes heures of Anne of Brittany
- Heures de Charles d'Angoulême
- Great Canterbury Psalter
- Hours of Henry VIII
- Hours of Henry IV of France
- Hours of Charles of Angoulême
- Hours of Jean de Montauban
- Isabella Breviary
- Liber astrologiae (Abū Maʿshar Treatise)
- Livre de la Chasse (Book of Hunt)
- Martyrology of Usuard
- Mattioli's Dioscorides illustrated by Cibo
- Miller Atlas
- Picture Book of the Life of St John and the Apocalypse
- Prayer Book of Albert of Brandenburg
- Romance of the Knight Zifar
- Splendor Solis
- Tacuinum Sanitatis
- The Apocalypse of 1313
- The Flemish Apocalypse
- The Golf Book (Book of Hours)
- The Gulbenkian Apocalypse
- The Val-Dieu Apocalypse
- The Book of Hours of Joanna I of Castile, Joanna the Mad
- Theatrum Sanitatis
- Theriaka and Alexipharmaka
- Tractatus de Herbis
- Universal Atlas of Diogo Homem
- Universal Atlas of Fernao Vaz Dourado
- Vallard Atlas
