= Panas Karampampas =

Social Anthropologist - researcher

- Πάνας Καράμπαμπας
- Born: Athens, Greece
- Known for: Dance Anthropology, Global Heritage Governance and Social Anthropology
- Scientific career
- Institutions: University of St. Andrews (2012-2016), École des hautes études en sciences sociales (2017-2021), Panteion University of Social and Political Sciences, Athens (2021-2023), Durham University (2023- )
- Thesis: Dancing into darkness : cosmopolitanism and 'peripherality' in the Greek goth scene (2016)

Panas Karampampas is a Social Anthropologist at Durham University (UK). He has previously held academic positions at Università Ca’ Foscari Venezia, Panteion University of Social and Political Sciences, Athens, the University of Peloponnese, the University of Thessaly, and the EHESS in Paris. He was also a guest lecturer in the Department of Social Anthropology at the University of St Andrews, where he completed his PhD, and a visiting scholar at the Faculty of Social Sciences of the HSE University in Moscow. He currently divides his time between the UK, Greece, and France.

Panas has completed UNESCO's ‘Training of Trainers for Intangible Cultural Heritage’ and is part of the Convention's network of facilitators.

== Early life ==
He grew up in the Athenian suburbs of Agios Dimitrios and Alimos, where his family has lived since 1905. Before pursuing anthropology, he studied Physical Education and Sport Science at the National and Kapodistrian University of Athens, earning his bachelor's degree with the second-highest grade in his cohort. He then completed an MA in Dance Anthropology at Roehampton University, London. Upon returning to Greece, he worked as a Physical Education teacher and Ju Jitsu coach. In 2012, he moved to Scotland to begin his PhD in Social Anthropology at St Andrews University. His doctoral research, completed in 2016, explored the goth scene, digital anthropology, dance, cosmopolitanism, and globalisation.

== Current work ==
He researches Intangible Cultural Heritage policy and global governance. His work has appeared in peer-reviewed journals including Social Anthropology/Anthropologie Sociale, the International Journal of Heritage Studies, and the Journal of Youth Studies. He co-edited Collaborative Intimacies: Anthropologies of Sound and Movement (Berghahn, 2017) and edited Intangible Cultural Heritage in times of economic “crisis”: Marketisation and Resilience (Hellenic Ministry of Culture and Sports Press, 2023), published open access in Greek. He also conducts sustained research in the Anthropology of Dance.

== Scholarly Memberships and Leadership ==
From 2025 to 2026, he was elected to the Executive Board of the European Association of Social Anthropologists (EASA). From 2018 to 2024, he co-convened the EASA Mediterraneanist Network (MedNet), and since 2022 he has co-convened the EASA Europeanist Network. He was also nominated and elected as a Founding Board Member of the Association of Social Anthropologists of Greece. Moreover, he is part of the Editorial Board of the Social Anthropology/Anthropologie Sociale Journal and Editor of Anthropological Journal of European Cultures (AJEC).

He also holds an Advanced European Scientific Diver certification, recognized under EU Directive 2005/36/EC and certified by the UK Scientific Diving Supervisory Committee, allowing him to lead scientific diving projects across the EEA.

== Impact beyond academia ==
The Council of Europe invited him to consult on community involvement in post-disaster heritage revitalisation, focusing on fostering a sense of belonging for refugee and migrant populations through Intangible Cultural Heritage. He later consulted for UNESCO. He is recognised as the first researcher in Greece to focus on Intangible Cultural Heritage policies, exploring the interplay between international organisations (such as UNESCO) and national approaches.

== Sports and scuba diving ==
In addition to his academic pursuits, he is a licensed coach in Kung Fu, Judo, and Ju Jitsu.

He is also a recreational and technical Scuba Diving diving instructor, as well as a Rebreather and wreck diver, with a personal depth record of 103 meters. He founded the diving organisation Deep Horizons and is a TDI/SDI Instructor Trainer, with qualifications to train recreational and technical diving instructors, including in extended-range and mixed-gas diving. His diving work includes scientific-diving consultancy, expedition planning and underwater research activities.
