= Fernão Vaz Dourado =

Portuguese cartographer

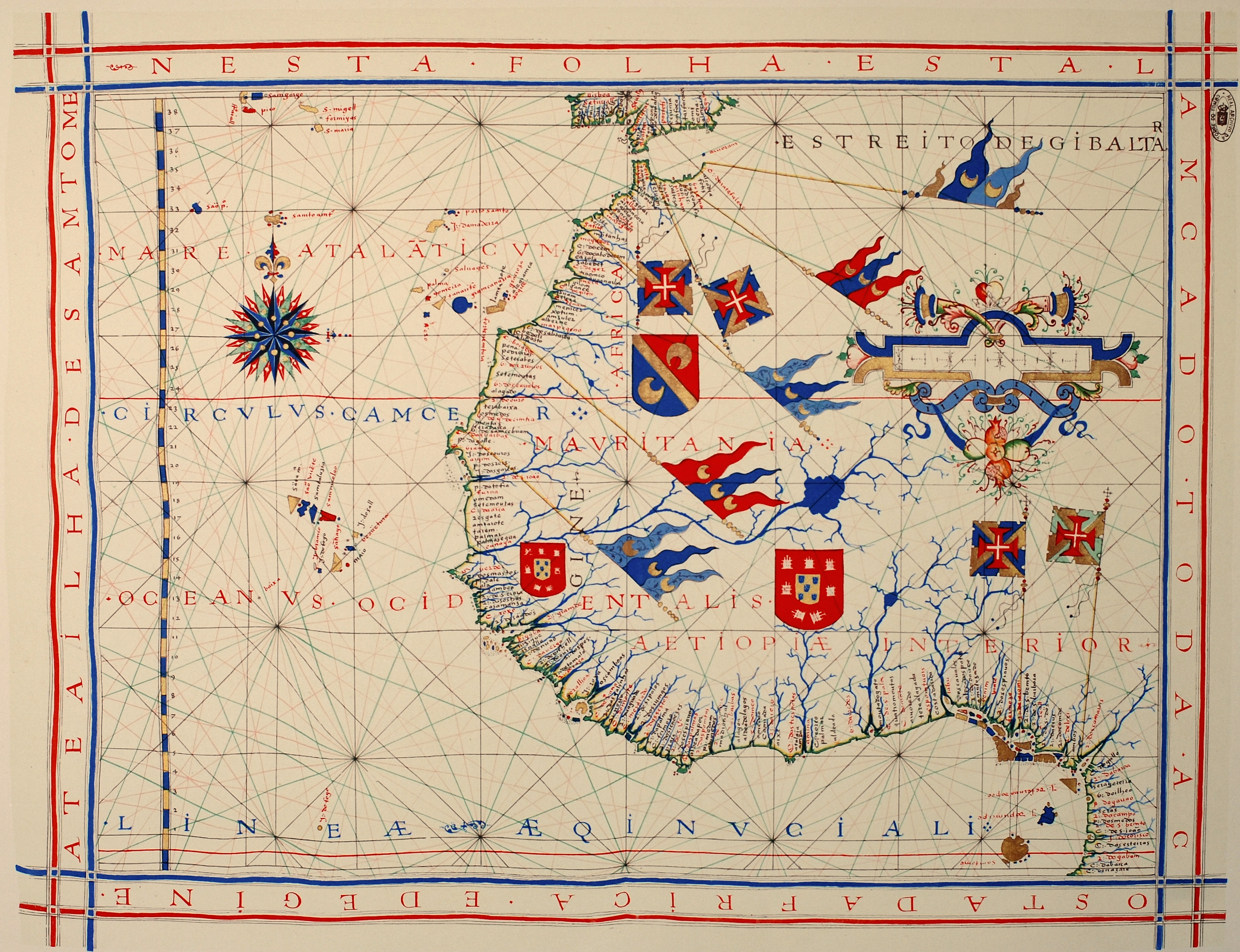
Nautical chart of the 1571 atlas, depicting the northwestern coast of Africa (Portuguese National Archives of Torre do Tombo, Lisbon). The text in the border reads: On this sheet is drawn all the coast of Africa and Guinea up to São Tomé Island

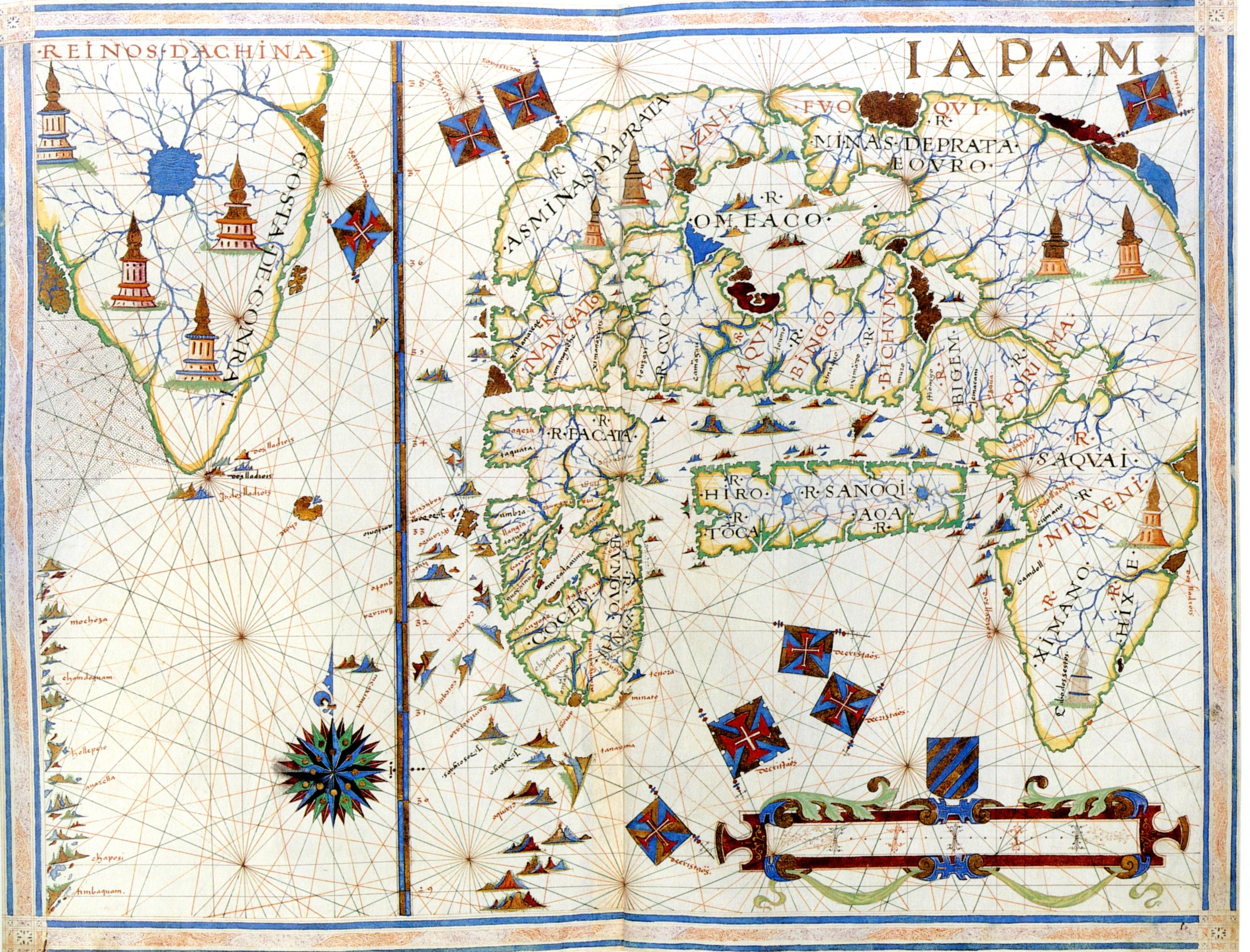
Japan (Iapam) and Korea, in the 1568 Portuguese map of the cartographer João Vaz Dourado

Fernão Vaz Dourado (c. 1520 in Goa – c. 1580 in Portuguese India) was a Portuguese cartographer. He belonged to the third period of the old Portuguese nautical cartography, which is characterised by the abandonment of Ptolemaic influence in the representation of the Orient and better accuracy in the depiction of lands and continents. Little is known about this historical figure.

== Works ==
His known works are of an extraordinary quality and beauty. He is considered one of the best cartographers of the time. Most of his charts are of relatively large scale and are included in nautical atlases. The following six atlases survive:

- 1568 - 20 manuscript sheets on parchment, dedicated to D. Luís de Ataíde (Biblioteca Nacional, Madrid)
- 1570 - 20 manuscript sheets on parchment (Huntington Library, San Marino, USA)
- 1571 - 20 manuscript sheets on parchment, from which 2 (the frontispiece and the Eastern Mediterranean) were stolen in 1851 (Torre do Tombo, Lisbon).
- c. 1576 - 20 manuscript sheets on parchment (Biblioteca Nacional de Portugal, Lisbon)
- 1575 - 21 manuscript sheets on parchment (British Library, London)
- 1580 - 20 manuscript sheets on parchment (Biblioteca Nacional de Portugal, Lisbon)

The plates of all the atlases are reproduced, mainly in monochrome in Portugaliae Monumenta Cartographica. The 1571 atlas was reproduced in colour, with a reconstructed frontispiece, and, inexplicably, with the Eastern Mediterranean plate from the 1576 atlas included without any explanation, in Atlas de Fernao Vaz Dourado : reprodcao fidelissima do exemplar do Torre do Tombo, datado de Goa, 1571", Porto: Livraria Civilizacao, 1948. The 1571 atlas was again reproduced in colour, in a boxed set of 18 loose sheets, as Universal Atlas of Fernão Vaz Dourado, Barcelona: M. Moleiro Editor, S.A., 2012.

The 1568 atlas contains the first large-scale charts of Ceylon (Sri Lanka) and Japan, later copied by many other cartographers.

His chart of the northwestern coast of Africa is executed using the so-called "plain chart model", where observed latitudes and magnetic directions were plotted directly into the plane, with a constant scale, as if the Earth were flat. Until the adoption of the Mercator projection charting method, this was Europe's most advanced charting method.

== Gallery ==
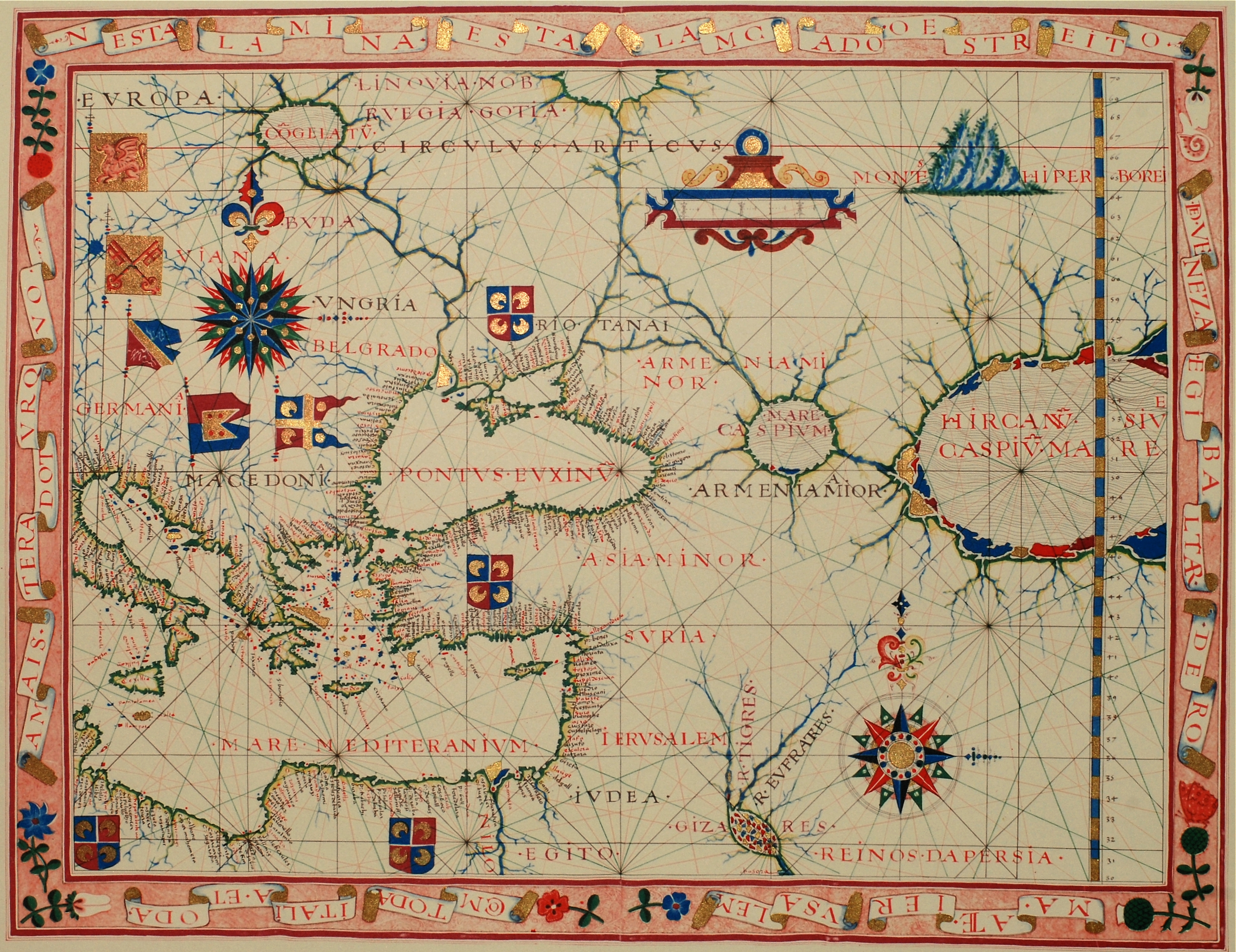
Atlas of 1570 (Huntington Library, San Marino, USA)

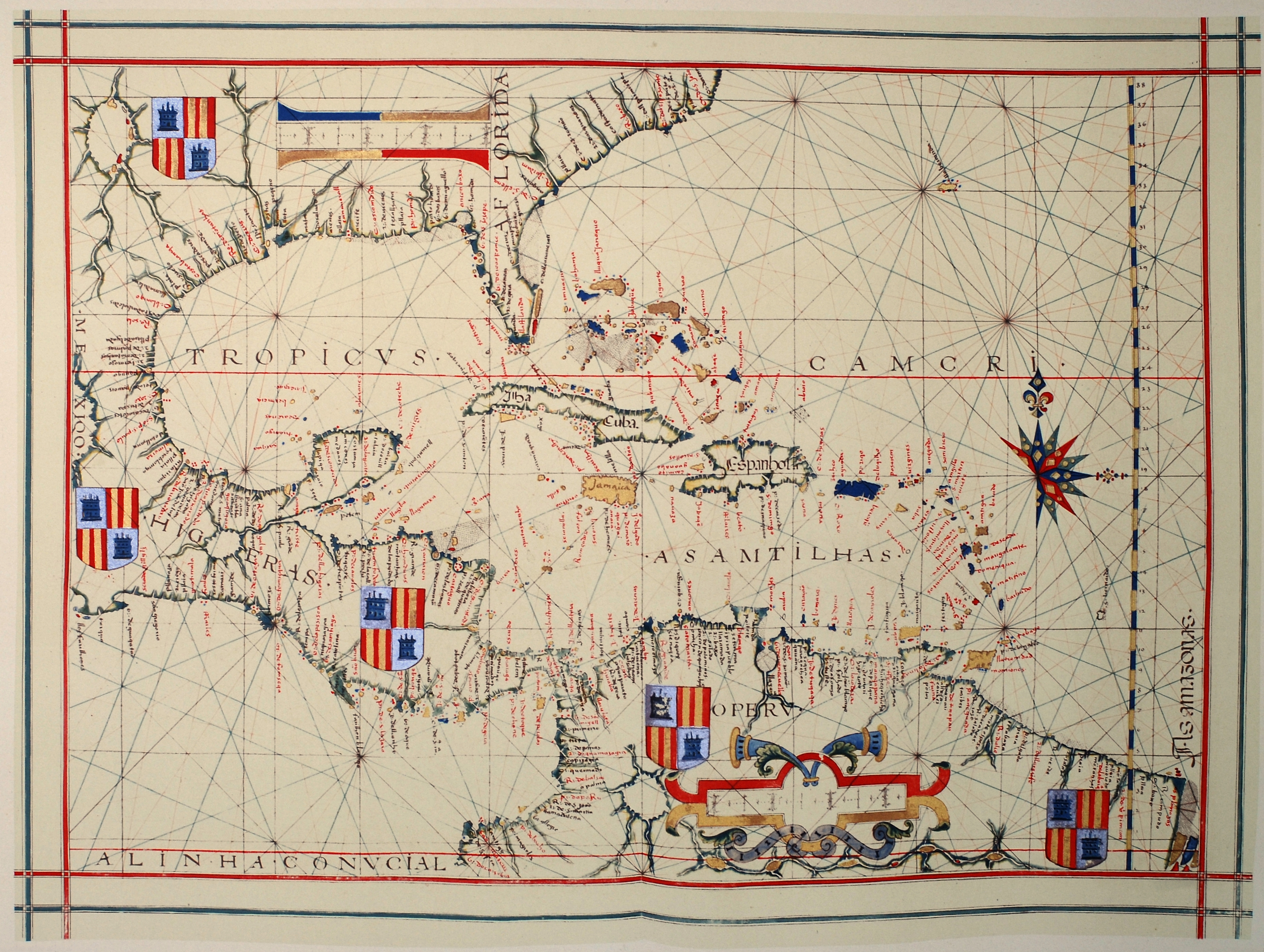
Atlas of 1575 (British Library, London)

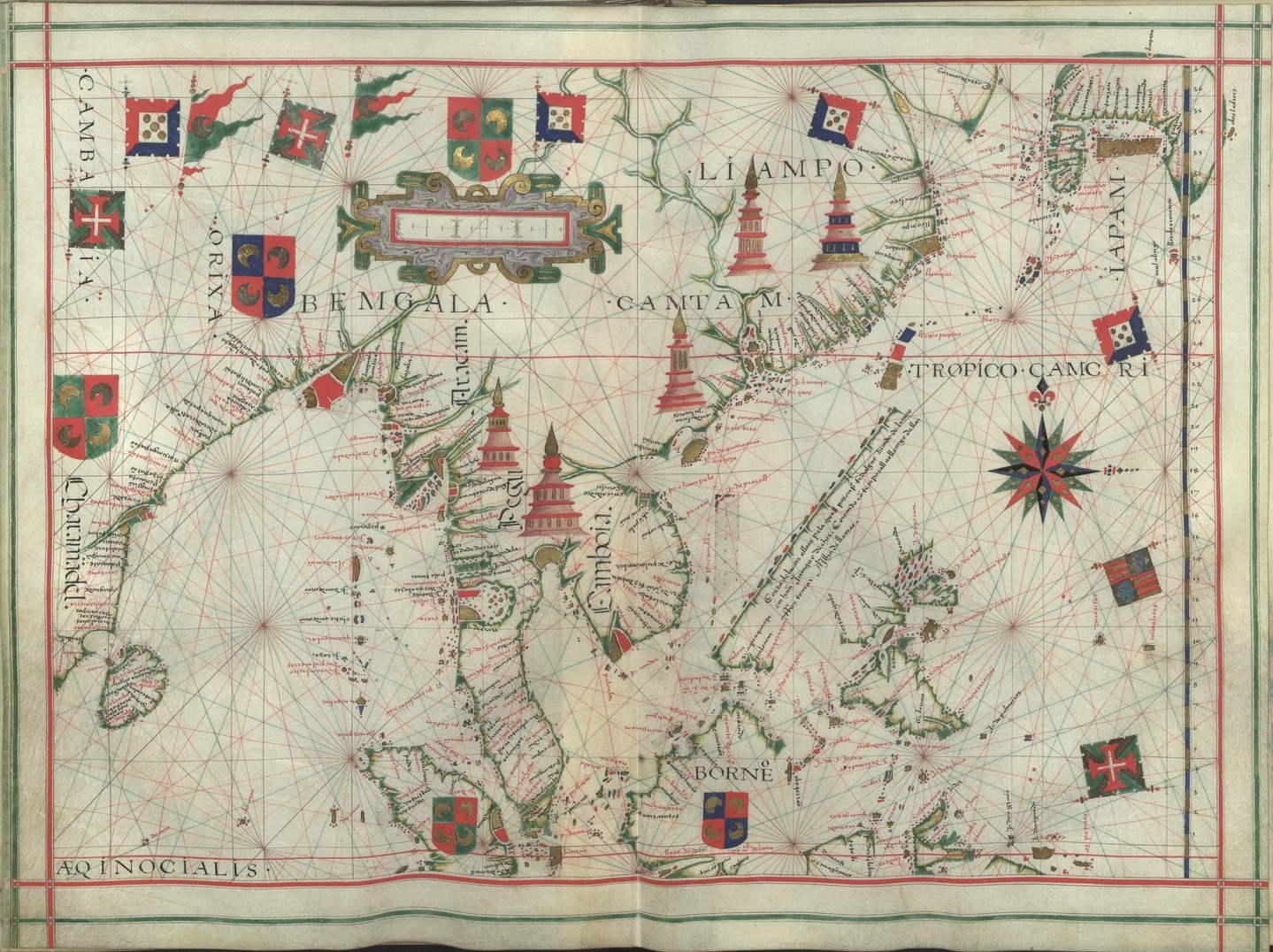
Atlas of 1576
