= Economic Anthropology (journal) =

- Discipline: Economic anthropology
- Language: English
- Edited by: Brandon D. Lundy

Publication details
- History: 2014–present
- Publisher: Wiley for the American Anthropological Association (USA)
- Frequency: Biannual
- Open access: No

Standard abbreviations
- ISO 4: Econ. Anthropol.

Indexing
- ISSN: 2330-4847

Links
- Journal homepage

Economic Anthropology is the journal of the Society for Economic Anthropology, a section of the American Anthropological Association (AAA). The journal was founded in 2014 with an annual themed issue and became biannual in 2016. The current editor-in-chief is Brandon D. Lundy, Professor of Anthropology at Kennesaw State University.

The journal publishes research in economic anthropology and archaeology, as well as related disciplines like economic sociology. In January 2022, the journal will launch a book review section.

== Past editors ==
- Brandon D. Lundy, Kennesaw State University (2018–Present)
- Katherine E. Browne, Colorado State University (? - 2018)
