= Bible of St Louis =

13th-century French illuminated manuscript

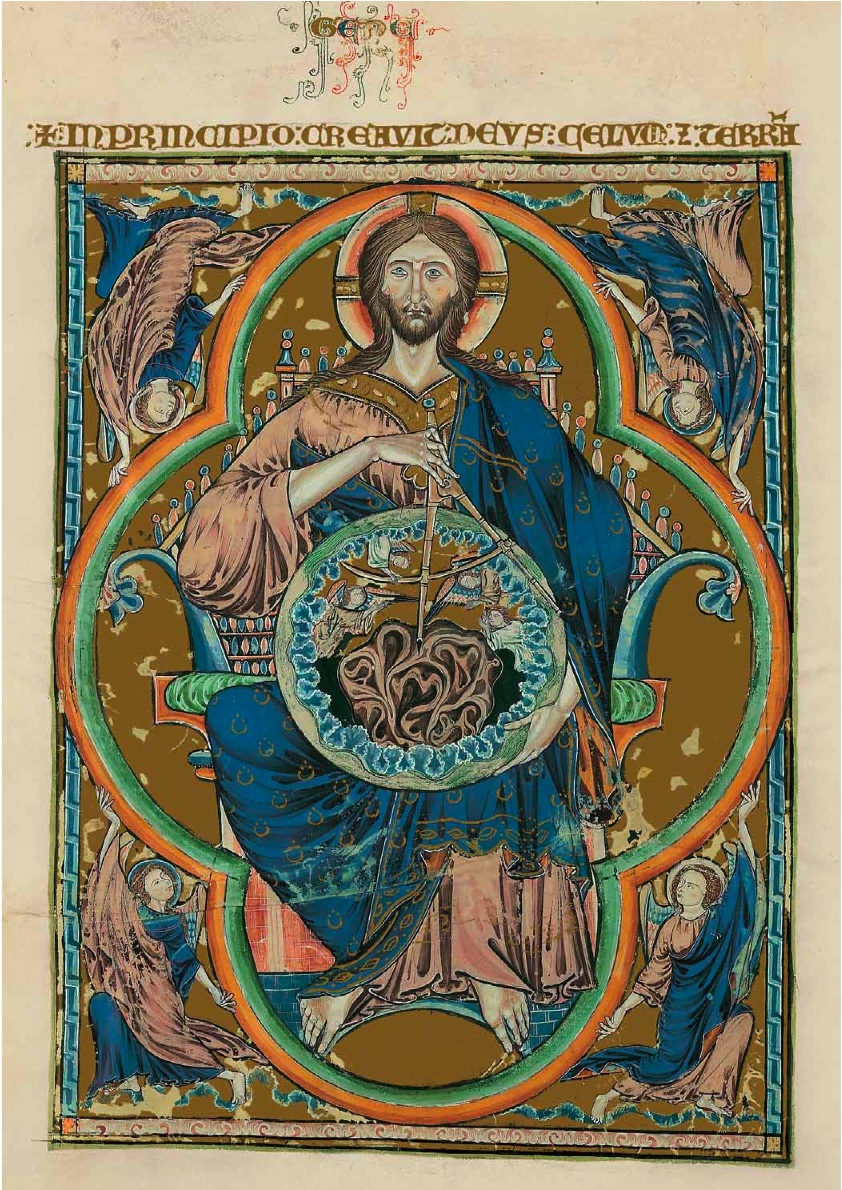
The St. Louis Bible - The Pantocrator, God the Son, as the Creator of the universe.

The Bible of St Louis, also called the Rich Bible of Toledo or simply the Toledo Bible, is a Bible moralisée in three volumes, made between 1226 and 1234 for King Louis IX of France (b. 1214) at the request of his mother Blanche of Castile. It is an illuminated manuscript that contains selections of the text of the Bible, along with a commentary and illustrations. Each page pairs Old and New Testament episodes with illustrations explaining their moral significance in terms of typology. Every excerpt of the Bible is illustrated with two miniatures. The first shows a representation of the text fragment as such, the second shows a theological or an allegorical scene explaining the text fragment in the light of the teachings of the Church. The miniatures are accompanied by the Bible text and by a short comment on the typological relationship between the two images.

Like other similar works, the book does not contain the full text of the Bible and is, despite its name, actually not a real Bible. The work would have served for the training of the young king. The manuscript has been kept for the past eight centuries in the Cathedral of Toledo, except for a fragment of eight leaves which is now in the Morgan Library & Museum in New York as MS M240.

== History ==
It is generally believed that the first reference to the Bible of St. Louis can be found in the second will and testament of Alfonso the Wise, of January 10, 1284. This will mentioned an “illuminated Bible in three volumes, given to us by king Louis of France". The will was written in Spanish. The original was lost, but an early copy reads as follows: "E mandamos otrosi, que las dos biblias et tres libros de letra gruesa, cobiertas de plata, é la otra en tres libros estoriada que nos dió el rey Luis de Francia, é la nuestra tabla con las reliquias, e las coronas con las piedras é con los camafeos é sortijas, é otras nobles que perteneçen al Rey, que lo aya todo aquel que con derecho por nos heredare el nuestro señorío mayor de Castilla é León". Shortly after the death of Alfonso his wills were translated into Latin and the original translations are still available.

The ‘Louis of France’ mentioned in the will might theoretically be Louis VIII of France, but considering that Alfonso was only five years old at the death of Louis VIII it is unlikely that the King Louis he referred to was Louis VIII, so the will must have meant Louis IX. Fernando III, Alfonso's father, was a cousin of Louis IX and there were close links between the French and the Castilian royalties.

Whether the three-volume historiated Bible mentioned in the will was in Seville or Toledo when the will was drafted, we can only guess. According to a note in the Historia Ecclesiastica de Toledo by Jerónimo Román de la Higuera, Alfonso had also left his possessions that were in Toledo at that time to his rightful successor, in a document apart from the will written in Seville. Toledo was occupied in 1284 by Sancho, the rebellious son of Alfonso.

The fact that the three-volume historiated Bible was separately mentioned in the will written in Seville could mean that it was in the possession of Alfonso at that time. Alfonso seemed to have reconciled with Sancho before his death and thus Sancho became the rightful successor, and the Bible was therefore probably in his possession. From this, one might conclude that the Bible ended up in the Cathedral of Toledo only after the death of Alfonso in 1284, perhaps as a donation from Sancho.

If the Bible mentioned in the will is indeed the ‘Bible of St. Louis’, there is still the question of when it came to Spain. Since Alfonso was crowned king during the participation of Louis IX on the seventh Crusade, one can suspect that the manuscript arrived in Spain after 1254. This was indeed a busy period in the dynastic relations between Spain and France.

The Toledo Bible was mentioned in an inventory of the treasures of the Cathedral of Toledo made in 1539 when Archbishop Tavera visited the cathedral. However, the Rich Bible was already described in 1466 by Gabriel Tetzel, a patrician from Nuremberg. Another testimony is the Osuna Bible, now kept in Madrid, which was copied from the Bible of St. Louis at the end of the 14th or the beginning of the 15th century. The text of this Osuna Bible ends at the Apocalypse of John, XIX: 15–16, like volume 3 of the Toledo Bible. This means that the Morgan fragment had already been removed from the Toledo Bible at that time.

This so-called Morgan fragment, which contains the authorship miniature, was owned by François de la Majorie, Seigneur des Granges et de la Majorie, around 1593. His coat of arms was painted on folio 1. The coat of arms in question was used from 1593 onwards, after his marriage to Anne de Turenne. The work stayed in the family and in 1838 it was owned by Alois de Chievres (1828–1904), who left it to his son in law the Vicomte George Marie Louis de Hillerin (1842–1892). It then passed to Otto Weiner. Morgan bought it from Louis Badin, a Parisian bookseller, in 1906.

== Patron ==
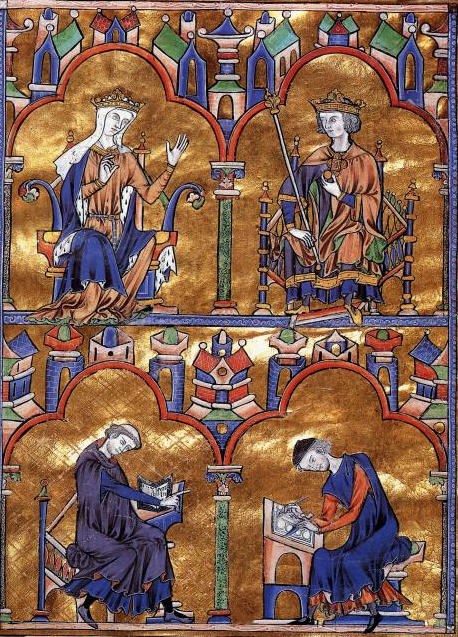
Bible of St. Louis - Morgan fragment, the authorship miniature

There is no written colophon or any other indication in the work about the patron who commissioned this Bible, but there is a kind of visual colophon. On the last page of the Morgan fragment we find a miniature that tells us something about the making of the Bible. The page is horizontally divided into two scenes. The upper half depicts a queen and a young beardless king. There are no attributes clearly identifying the couple, but the queen has been thought to be Blanche of Castile. She is seated on a throne, garbed in her regal cloak and wearing a white veil. She speaks to the young king, her son Louis IX, who listens respectfully while he holds the gold bull hanging upon his chest. According to John Lowden, the scene suggests the dedication of the Bible by his mother to the young king. If this is correct, it was Blanche who commissioned the work.

The bottom section of the miniature shows two people, smaller in size (thus lower in rank). The figure on the left is a cleric, as can be seen from his tonsure. The man on the right is a scribe and he is working on a Bible Moralisée, as can be seen from the page layout. It is obvious that the cleric is giving instructions to the scribe and supervises the work on the Bible. The appearance of the cleric suggests that he is a member of a religious order.

Based on this miniature, the book is dated between 1226 and 1234. Louis IX acceded to the throne in 1226 and married Margaret of Provence in 1234. Since the miniature depicts a young, unmarried king, the work must be dated in the time frame between his coronation and his marriage.

== Description ==
The Bible of St. Louis consists today of three volumes kept in the treasure of the Cathedral of Toledo and a fragment of 8 folios (one quire) kept in the Morgan Library & Museum in New York.

Volume 1

Size: 422 × 305 mm, writing space: ca. 295 × 210 mm. It contains 192 numbered parchment folios. There are two parchment flyleaves at the beginning and at the end of the volume, with an additional paper flyleaf at the back. The first volume opens with a full page illumination showing the Pantocrator, God the Son, as the Creator of the universe. The rest of the work contains the texts and miniatures as described in the section ‘Iconography’. The first volume contains 1.529 miniatures with text excerpts from the books: Genesis, Exodus, Leviticus, Numbers, Deuteronomy, Joshua, Judges, Ruth, Regum i. (1 Samuel), Regum ii. (2 Samuel), Regum iii. (1 Kings), Regum iiii. (2 Kings), Esdrae i (Ezra); Esdrae ii (Nehemiah), Tobit, Judith, Esther and Job.

Volume 2

Size: 422 × 305 mm, writing space: ca. 300 × 215 mm. This volume contains 224 numbered parchment folios and six parchment flyleaves, three in the front and three at the back. The 1.792 miniatures illustrate excerpts from: Job, Psalms, Proverbs, Ecclesiastes, Song of Songs, Wisdom, Ecclesiasticus, Isaiah, Jeremiah, Ezekiel, Daniel, Hosea, Joel, Amos, Obadiah, Jonah, Micah, Haggai, Zechariah and Malachi.

Volume 3

Size: 430 × 305 mm, writing space: ca. 293 × 207 mm. It consists of 190 numbered folios made of parchment. Front and rear, three parchment flyleaves. The volume is illustrated with 1.520 miniatures and is dedicated to the New Testament, containing texts from the four Gospels, the Acts of the Apostles, the Epistles of Paul, James, Peter and John, the Epistola catholica judae and the Apocalypse of St. John, up to chapter XIX:15-16.

Volume 4 (Morgan M240)

Size: 375 × 265 mm, writing space: ca. 285 × 208 mm. It is composed of 8 parchment folios, with an additional parchment flyleaf at the front and at the back. The fragment contains 57 miniatures, 56 medallions and one full page miniature, the so-called dedication miniature. The eight folios are not bound in the right order of the Apocalypse. This fragment contains the last chapters from the Apocalypse of St. John starting with XIX: 17.

The content of the Bible of Saint Louis largely corresponds to that of the Vulgate as given in the 'Parisian Bible' from the 13th century. There are some exceptions, the books of Chronicles I and II, III Ezra, Baruch, and the Maccabees are not in the Toledo Bible. In contrast, the books of the Maccabees do occur in Harley 1526 (see 'Similar manuscripts) that is considered as modeled on Bible of Saint Louis [16] This suggests that the Maccabee books were present originally, but were los later on.

== Iconography ==
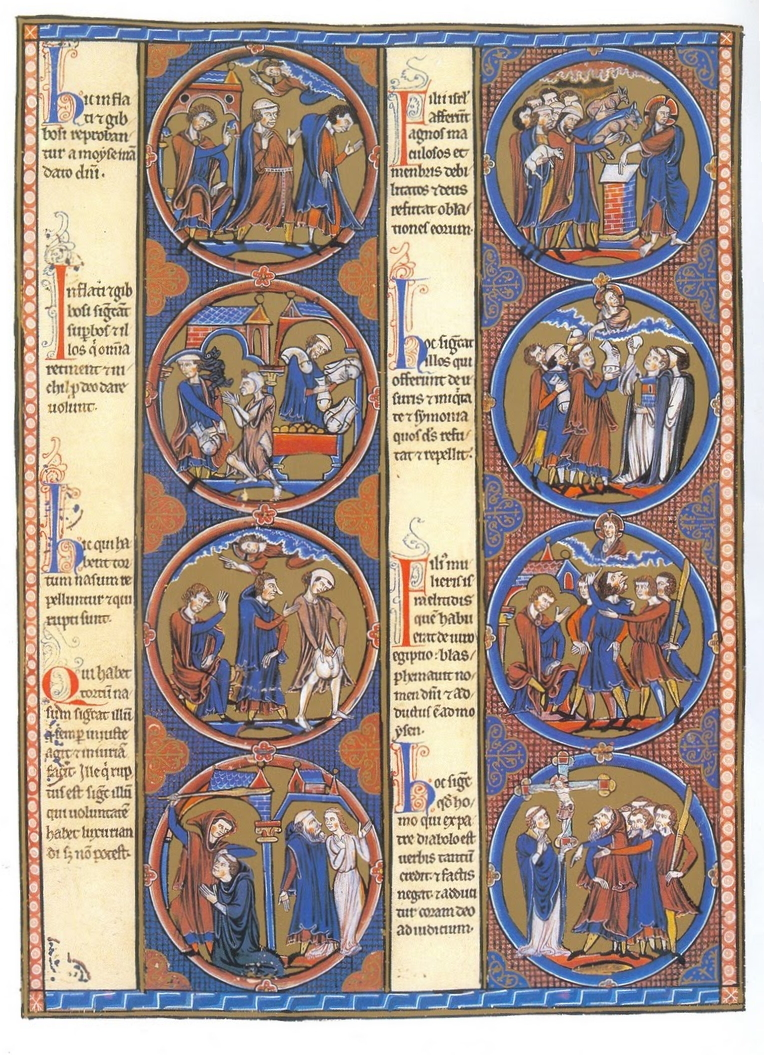
Bible of St. Louis, f58r with text and scenes from Leviticus

The Bible's layout is similar to the layout of the other three early Bibles Moralisées. On each page there are two columns, each with four miniatures set in medallions, which work as pairs. The upper miniature of each pair illustrates the text of the Old Testament, the lower shows a typologically equivalent scene from the New Testament or an allegorical or mystical meaning of the Old Testament story. Besides the miniatures, there are two narrow columns with explanatory text.

If we call the medallions on the Old Testament A, B, C and D and the accompanying explanatory miniatures a, b, c, and d, the page layout would look as follows:

A	C
a	c
B	D
b	d

The text columns are 25 mm wide, the columns for the medallions 75 mm.

Only one side of each folio was used to paint on, the other side was left empty. This procedure doubled the size of the work and made the creation of this bible very expensive. The artists used the hair-side of the parchment to work on. It is a bit rougher than the flesh-side, so the paint and pigments adhere better. The painted folios were arranged so that one opening showed two painted sides and the next opening was left empty.

The miniatures were painted on a background of burnished gold and a wide range of colors (blues, greens, reds, yellows, grays, oranges and sepia) was used. The overall composition brims with highly expressive artistic and technical resources. Most of the medallions contain a single scene, although some are split in two by a cloud, arch or straight line. The illustrators used the moralisations to include criticisms of society from a monastic viewpoint. The Bible is a portrayal of medieval life in the first half of the 13th century with pictures of men, the social groups that existed, vices and virtues, apparel, customs, beliefs, games and ideals. Like the other Bibles Moralisées the work also contains many anti-Semitic illustrations.

== Similar manuscripts ==
The Bible of St. Louis is part of the four early Bibles Moralisées created in the period between 1220 and 1234. These four Bibles are very similar to each other but especially the Oxford-Paris-London version and the Toledo-Morgan version are strongly related.

The oldest Bibles Moralisées are the ones kept in Vienna (Codex Vindobonensis 1179 and 2554) which are very similar to each other. However ÖNB 2554 is much shorter (129 folia ) than ÖNB 1179 ( 246 folia ), it contains only the books Genesis to Kings 4 and it is written in Old French while ÖNB 1179 is in Latin.

Researchers do not agree on whether ÖNB 2554 remained unfinished or if a part of the manuscript was lost. It has been assumed that this manuscript was made in the region of Reims. Nowadays, however, scholars agree that it originated in Paris. ÖNB 1179 is more complete in content, but it diverges substantially from the Oxford-Paris-London and the Toledo-Morgan bible in the sequence of the books of the bible. ÖNB 2554 and ÖNB 1179 are sometimes referred to as the first generation of Bibles Moralisées.

The second generation of Bibles Moralisées consists of the three-volume manuscripts Oxford-Paris-London and Toledo-Morgan. This second generation follows the Vulgate much more closely than the works of the first generation. In his study of 1911–1927, Laborde gives an extensive description of the similarity between the two bibles. He assumed that the text of both bibles was based on the same preparatory work. According to modern research, the Bible of Saint Louis and the Oxford-Paris-London Bible were made almost simultaneously and some scholars think that the Bible of St. Louis served as a model for the Oxford-Paris-London. In the first two volumes the illumination is very similar, while the text excerpts show more differences. The illumination of the Toledo Bible is clearly of a better quality than that in the Oxford-Paris-London Bible, which apparently was made under the pressure of time. The third volume of the Toledo Bible and that of the Oxford-Paris-London Bible shows more differences. The Toledo Bible is lacking the books of the Maccabees present in Harley 1526. The treatment of the Apocalypse is quite similar in both works, but other parts of the New Testament are treated very differently.

The Oxford-Paris-London Bible was also copied towards the end of the 13th or the beginning of the 14th century. This work is now preserved in the British Library with signature Add. 18719. The Osuna Bible now kept in Madrid is a copy of the text of the Bible of St. Louis. In this work the space for the miniatures was provided, but the illumination was never done.

=== List of the Bibles Moralisées ===
- Vienna, Österreichische Nationalbibliothek, Codex Vindobonensis 1179 (1220–1226)
- Vienna, Österreichische Nationalbibliothek, Codex Vindobonensis 2554 (1220–1230)
- Oxford-Paris-London (ca. 1233)
  - Oxford, Bodleian Library, Ms. Bodley 270b
  - Paris, BnF, Ms. Latin 11560
  - London, British Library, Harley Ms. 1526–1527
- Toledo-Morgan (ca. 1233)
  - Toledo, Cathedral of Toledo, Bible moralisée (Biblia de San Luis), 3 volumes
  - New York, Morgan Library and Museum, M. 240 (fragment)
- London, British Library, Add. 18719 (Copied from the Oxford-Paris-Harley end 13th begin 14th century)
- Paris, BnF, Fr. 167 (1345–1355) – The Bible of John the Good
- Paris, BnF, Fr. 166 (mid 15th century) – The Bible of Philip the Bold
- Madrid, Biblioteca Nacional de España, Ms. 10232 (14th century)

== Sources ==
- Philippe Büttner, Bilder zum betreten der zeit: Bible Moralisée und Kapetingishes Königtum, Allschwill 2002, Gissler Druck AG.
- Le comte A. de Laborde, Etude sur la Bible Illustrée, Paris, 1911–1927. Volume 5
- Facsimile of Ms M.240 New York, Pierpont Morgan Library: Akademische Druck- u. Verlagsanstalt (ADEVA), Graz 1995. Complete colour facsimile edition of the 20 pages (10 pages of pictures, 10 blank pages) in original size of 375 × 262 mm. 56 picturer-medaillons, 1 full-page miniature, illustrations and ornamentation rich in gold. All folios are cut according to the original. Commentary volume: Commentary by H.-W. Stork (German/English), 100 pp., 9 illustrations, 28,3 × 40,2 cm. CODICES SELECTI, Vol. CII
