= Journal of Early Modern Studies =

- Discipline: Intellectual history
- Language: English
- Edited by: Vlad Alexandrescu, and Dana Jalobeanu

Publication details
- History: 2012–present
- Publisher: Zeta Books (Romania)
- Frequency: Biannual

Standard abbreviations
- ISO 4: J. Early Mod. Stud.

Indexing
- ISSN: 2285-6382 (print); 2285-6382 (web)

Links
- Journal homepage

The Journal of Early Modern Studies (JEMS) is a biannual double-blind peer-reviewed academic journal of intellectual history, specializing in the interactions between philosophy, science and religion in Early Modern Europe, published by Zeta Books.

== History ==
The journal was established in 2012 by a group of Romanian scholars, at the Research Centre “Foundations of Modern Thought” of the University of Bucharest. The journal appears twice a year, with occasional special issues. Most articles are in English; some are in French

== Editors ==
The editors-in-chief are Vlad Alexandrescu and Dana Jalobeanu.
