= Stuffed ribs =

Turkish and American lamb dish

Stuffed Ribs
- Region or state: United States, Turkey, Arab world
- Serving temperature: Hot

Stuffed ribs, also known as Kaburga Dolması in Turkish, or dela’ah mehshi (Arabic: دلعاء محشي) in Arabic, is a dish that is popular in the United States, Turkey and the Arab world, but the American and Middle Eastern versions differ drastically and are not historically connected. The ingredients for American stuffed ribs are typically pork spare ribs, a savory bread-based stuffing made with breadcrumbs, onions, celery, garlic, butter, herbs like sage and thyme, eggs to bind, and sometimes sausage or chopped apples for added flavor. Some variations also stuff ribs with cheese and potatoes. The ingredients for Turkish and Arabic stuffed ribs are lamb ribs, shank meat, rice, butter, black pepper, allspice, water, almonds, pepper paste, parsley and basil.
