= Anthropological Journal of European Cultures =

Journal of European anthropology

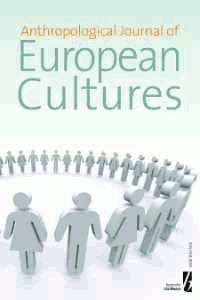
- Discipline: Anthropology
- Language: English
- Edited by: P. Karampampas, J. Cash

Publication details
- Former name: Anthropological Yearbook of European Cultures
- History: 1990-present
- Publisher: Berghahn Books
- Frequency: Biannually

Standard abbreviations
- ISO 4: Anthropol. J. Eur. Cult.

Indexing
- ISSN: 1755-2923 (print); 1755-2931 (web)
- JSTOR: 17552923

Links
- Journal homepage

The Anthropological Journal of European Cultures is a biannual peer-reviewed academic journal that was established in 1990 as the Anthropological Yearbook of European Cultures. It obtained its current title in 2008 when Berghahn Books took over as the publisher. The journal covers research addressing the cultural and social changes of societies in contemporary Europe. The editors-in-chief are Panas Karampampas, Durham University, UK and Jennifer Cash (Nanyang Technological University, Singapore.

== Editors-in-chief ==
The following persons are or have been editors-in-chief:

- 2026- : Jennifer Cash & Panas Karampampas
- 2024-2025: Aleksandar Bošković & Jennifer Cash
- 2022-2024: Patrick Laviolette & Aleksandar Bošković
- 2020-2022: Elisabeth Timm & Patrick Laviolette
- 2017-2019: Ullrich Kockel & Elisabeth Timm
- 2006-2017: Ullrich Kockel
- 1990-2006: Ina-Maria Greverus, Christian Giordano

== Abstracting and indexing ==
The journal is abstracted and indexed in:

- Abstracts in Anthropology
- Anthropological Literature
- International Bibliography of Book Reviews of Scholarly Literature on the Humanities and Social Sciences
- International Bibliography of the Social Sciences
- International Bibliography of Periodical Literature
- MLA International Bibliography
- Scopus
- Sociological Abstracts
