= Manuscript Studies =

- Discipline: Palaeography
- Language: English
- Edited by: Nicholas Herman, Lynn Ransom

Publication details
- History: 2016–present
- Publisher: University of Pennsylvania Press (United States)
- Frequency: Biannually

Standard abbreviations
- ISO 4: Manuscr. Stud.

Indexing
- ISSN: 2381-5329 (print); 2380-1190 (web)
- LCCN: 2015203085
- OCLC no.: 1137812507

Links
- Journal homepage; Online access at Project MUSE

Manuscript Studies is a biannual peer-reviewed academic journal in the field of palaeography. It was established in 2016 and is published by the University of Pennsylvania Press. The editors-in-chief are Nicholas Herman and Lynn Ransom.

== Abstracting and indexing ==
The journal is abstracted and indexed in the Emerging Sources Citation Index, Modern Language Association Database, and Scopus.
