= History and Anthropology =

Anthropology journal

- Discipline: Anthropology
- Language: English
- Edited by: David Henig

Publication details
- History: 1984-present
- Publisher: Routledge
- Frequency: 5/year

Standard abbreviations
- ISO 4: Hist. Anthropol.

Indexing
- CODEN: HIAND7
- ISSN: 0275-7206 (print); 1477-2612 (web)
- LCCN: 86646963
- OCLC no.: 49941297

Links
- Journal homepage; Online access; Online archive

History and Anthropology is a peer-reviewed academic journal covering anthropology published by Routledge. From 1984 until 2013, it was published quarterly. From 2014, the journal began publishing five times a year. The founding editors-in-chief were François Hartog (University of Strasbourg), Lucette Valensi, and Nathan Wachtel (both of Ecole des Hautes Etudes en Sciences Sociales). The current editor is David Henig (University of Kent).

== Abstracting and indexing ==
The journal is abstracted and indexed in Anthropological Index Online, Historical Abstracts, Humanities International Index, Index Islamicus, International Bibliography of the Social Sciences, and Sociological Abstracts.
