= Revue Européenne des Migrations Internationales =

- Discipline: Migration studies, demography, anthropology, geography
- Language: French, English, Spanish
- Edited by: Olivier Clochard, Constance De Gourcy, Yann Scioldo-Zürcher

Publication details
- History: 1985–present
- Publisher: University of Poitiers (France)
- Frequency: Quarterly
- Open access: Yes
- License: CC BY 4.0

Standard abbreviations
- ISO 4: Rev. Eur. Migr. Int.

Indexing
- ISSN: 0765-0752 (print); 1777-5418 (web)
- LCCN: 87648456
- OCLC no.: 909782005

Links
- Journal homepage; Online access at Cairn.info; Online archive at Persée

The Revue Européenne des Migrations Internationales is a quarterly peer-reviewed academic journal published by the University of Poitiers. Articles can be freely accessed via the OpenEdition Journals and Cairn.info platforms. The main publication languages are French and English, the abstracts are also available in Spanish. Issues published prior to 2002 are available via Persée.

== History ==
The journal was established in 1985 by Gildas Simon (University of Poitiers/CNRS) to disseminate the results of the research on international migration and interethnic relations, promote new research topics and subjects, and contribute to the scientific collaboration between European researchers and institutions. The creation of the journal, along with the "Migrinter" research laboratory, constituted a milestone in international migration studies. In particular, it contributed to the popularization of the concept of transnationalism in France. It can also be considered as one of the main Western journals dealing with Arab/African Migration studies.

Initially published three times a year, the journal became a quarterly in 2012.

The journal is abstracted and indexed in many international databases such as Open Policy Finder, DOAJ and Scopus.

The journal has recently published a special issue for its 40th anniversary.

== Editors-in-chief ==
The following persons are or have been editor-in-chief (University of Poitiers/CNRS, unless specified otherwise):

- 1985–1992: Gildas Simon
- 1993–1994: Gildas Simon and Michelle Guillon
- 1994–1999: Michelle Guillon
- 2000–2006: Michelle Guillon and Marie-Antoinette Hily
- 2007–2010: Marie-Antoinette Hily
- 2010–2014: Marie-Antoinette Hily and William Berthomière
- 2014–2015: William Berthomière and Véronique Petit (Université Paris Cité)
- 2016–2018: Véronique Petit and Emmanuel Ma Mung
- 2018–2022: Olivier Clochard and Camille Schmoll (School for Advanced Studies in the Social Sciences)
- 2022–2025: Olivier Clochard, Constance De Gourcy (Mesopolhis) and Yann Scioldo-Zürcher (Centre de recherches historiques)
- 2025–present: Adelina Miranda, Constance De Gourcy (Mesopolhis) and Yann Scioldo-Zürcher (Centre de recherches historiques)
