= Journal of Anthropological Sciences =

- Discipline: Anthropology
- Language: English
- Edited by: Giovanni Destro-Bisol

Publication details
- Former name(s): Atti della Società Romana di Antropologia, Rivista di Antropologia
- History: 1893–present
- Publisher: Istituto Italiano di Antropologia
- Frequency: Annual
- Impact factor: 4.000 (2016)

Standard abbreviations
- ISO 4: J. Anthropol. Sci.

Indexing
- ISSN: 1827-4765 (print); 2037-0644 (web)
- LCCN: 2006262146
- OCLC no.: 469815136

Links
- Journal homepage; Online archive

The Journal of Anthropological Sciences is an annual peer-reviewed open-access scientific journal covering anthropology. It was established in 1893 as the Atti della Società Romana di Antropologia, and was renamed the Rivista di Antropologia in 1911. In 2003, it was given its current name. It is published by the Istituto Italiano di Antropologia and the editor-in-chief is Giovanni Destro-Bisol (Sapienza University of Rome). According to the Journal Citation Reports, the journal has a 2016 impact factor of 4.000, ranking it 2nd out of 82 journals in the category "Anthropology".
