= Velislai biblia picta =

14th-century Central European illuminated manuscript

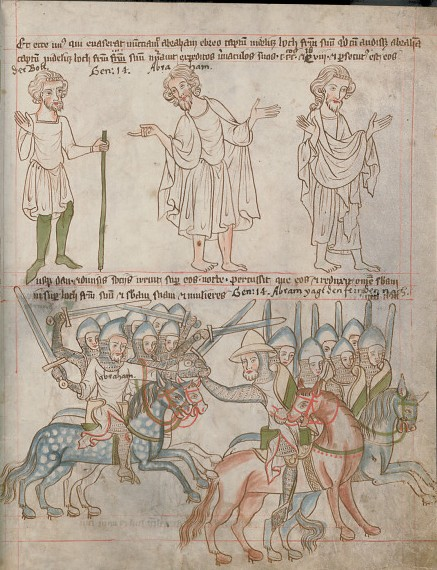
Abraham learns of Lot's captivity, as depicted in the Velislai biblia picta

The Velislaus Bible or Velislav's Bible (Czech: Velislavova bible; Latin Velislai biblia picta) is an illuminated manuscript of 1325–1349. It is in effect a picture-book of the Bible, as the text is limited to brief titles or descriptions of the 747 pictures from the Old Testament and the New Testament, from the writings about the Antichrist and from the legends of the saints, especially St Wenceslas. It is therefore an example of a Biblia pauperum, though not in the typical form, having many more images. Most of the illuminations are only in ink, though some colour is used.

The manuscript is of 188 folios on parchment, with a page size of 307 x 245 mm. It currently sits in the Czech National Library (Národní knihovna Ceské republiky), Prague. The codex was created by several artists probably for Velislav the Canon (d. 1367), the notary of John I of Bohemia and his son Charles IV, Holy Roman Emperor, who were both based in Prague.

== Bibliography ==
- Panušková, Lenka, ed. The Velislav Bible, Finest Picture-Bible of the Late Middle Ages: Biblia Depicta as Devotional, Mnemonic and Study Tool. Central European Medieval Studies. Amsterdam University Press, 2018.
- Richterová, Alena "Velislavova Bible" in: Grbad Biblio; 2009, ročník 3, číslo 2 (13 pp.)
- Uhlíř, Zdeněk: Velislavova bible = Velislai biblia picta = Velislaus Bible. Praha 2007. ISBN 978-80-7050-516-8
