= Index of dance articles =

Index of Dance
an index of Wikipedia's
Dance articles.

Article · Category · Outline · WikiProject

This is an alphabetical index of articles related to dance.

== A ==
Académie Royale de Danse - Academy Award for Best Dance Direction - Acro dance - Action stroke dance notation - Aerial dance - Aerobics - African dance - Albanian dances - Allemande - Antikristos - Antimasque - Arab dance - Aragonaise - Armenian dance - Assyrian folk dance - The Australian Ballet - Australian Ballet School - Australian contemporary dance - Austrian folk dance - Authentic Movement - Awards - Azerbaijani ballet - Azerbaijani dances

== B ==
Backup dancer - Baladi - Balanchine technique - Balinese dance - Ballerina skirt - Ballet - Ballet (music) - Ballet blanc - Ballet d'action - Ballet company - Ballet dancer - Ballet Folklórico de México - Ballet Folklórico Oro Lenca - Ballet Hispanico - Ballet in Turkey - Ballet Manila - Ballet master - Ballet National de Marseille - Ballet shoes - Ballet technique - Ballets de cour - Ballets Russes - Ballon (ballet) - Ballroom dance - Barcelona Ballet - Barn dance - Baroque dance - Barre (ballet) - Basic (dance move) - Basque dance - Basse danse - Bauhaus dances - Bayerisches Staatsballett - Beauchamp–Feuillet notation - Beguine (dance) - Béjart Ballet - Belly dance - Benesh Movement Notation - Bihu dance - Biodanza - Birmingham Royal Ballet - Black and Blue Festival - Black Bottom - Blues dance - Bogle dance - Bolshoi Ballet - Boombal - Border Morris - Bournonville method - Bourrée - Branle - Breakdancing - Breton dance - British Association of Teachers of Dancing - British ballet - British Ballet Organization - British Sequence Championships - Buchaechum - Bulgarian dances - Burmese dance - Bush dance - Byzantine dance

== C ==
Calabrian Tarantella - Caller (dancing) - Căluşari - Canada's National Ballet School - Canary dance - Candomblé - Cecchetti method - Ceili dance - Ceremonial dance - Chaconne - Character dance - Chari Dance - Chicken dance - Choreography - Choreography (dance) - Choreopoem - Chorus line - Circassian dance -- Circle dance - Classical ballet - Classical Persian dance - Clog dancing - Clogging - Closed position - Collegiate shag - Comic ballet - Competitive dance - Compulsory dance - Concert dance - Connection - Contact improvisation - Contemporary ballet - Contemporary dance - Contemporary dance in Japan - Contra body movement - Contra dance - Contra dance choreography - Contra dance form - Coppélia - Corps de ballet - Cotillion - Council for Dance Education and Training - Country dance - Country–western dance - Courante - Csárdás - Cuban National Ballet School - Cullberg Ballet

== D ==
Dance - Dance and health - Dance basic topics - Dance belt - Dance card - Dance costume - Dance critique - Dance double - Dance education - Dance etiquette - Dance film - Dance forms of Tamil Nadu - Dance hall - Dance improvisation - Dance in ancient Egypt - Dance in Australia - Dance in California - Dance in Cambodia - Dance in Cameroon - Dance in Canada - Dance in China - Dance in Cuba - Dance in film - Dance in Hawaii - Dance in Indonesia - Dance in Israel - Dance in Kiribati - Dance in mythology and religion - Dance in Nicaragua - Dance in Quebec - Dance in Singapore - Dance in Thailand - Dance in the Netherlands - Dance in Rotuma - Dance in the United States - Dance in Uzbekistan - Dance in Venezuela - Dance in Zimbabwe - Dance marathon - Dance move - Dance music - Dance notation - Dance of India - Dance of the Seven Veils - Dance of Wallis and Futuna - Dance on television - Dance partnering - Dance party - Dance permit - Dance personalities Dance positions - Dance research - Dance science - Dance slot - DanceSport - Dance squad - Dance studio - Dance suite - Dance technology - Dance theory - Dance therapy - Dance troupe - Dances of Georgia - Dances of Sri Lanka - Dances of Universal Peace - Dancing ban - Dancing mania - Dancing with the Stars - Danish folk dance - Danse des petits cygnes - Danseur Étoile - Danseur noble - Dansmuseet - Demi-soloist - Deutscher Tanzpreis - Direction of movement (dance) - Dirk dance - Don Quixote (ballet) - Dream ballet - Dutch folk dance

== E ==
Eccentric dance - École supérieure de ballet du Québec - Écossaise - Ecstatic dance - Eisa (dance) - End zone dance - English country dance - English National Ballet - Espringale - Estampie - Ethnochoreology - Etighi Dance - European dances - Exotic dancer - Expressionist dance

== F ==
Farandole - Faroese dance - Figure skating lifts - The Firebird - Fire dancing - First dance - Flagging dance - Flamenco - Folk dance - Folk dance in India - Folk dance of Mexico - Folk dances of Punjab - Footwork (dance) - Frame (dance) - Free dance - Free dance (figure skating) - French ballet - Furlana - Fusion dance

== G ==
Gair dance - Galliard - Galop - Gandrung - The Gaskell Ball - Gavotte - Gay square dance, International Association of Gay Square Dance Clubs - Gayane (ballet) - Gendang beleq - Georgian dance - German Dance Platform - Ghost Dance - Gigue - Giselle - Goh Ballet Academy - Graham technique - Grand pas - Les Grands Ballets Canadiens - Greek dances - Grossvater Tanz - Grotesque dance

=== Glossary articles ===
Glossary of ballet terms - Glossary of belly dance terms - Glossary of country dance terms - Glossary of dance moves - Glossary of partner dance terms

== H ==
Haka - Hako (Rapa Nui) - Hamburg Ballet - Handhold - Harlem Shake (meme) - Higher Institute of Ballet - Hip hop dance - Historical dance - History of ballet - History of dance - History of hip-hop dance - History of the Diablada - History of the tango - Hong Kong Ballet - Hoop dance - Hopak - Hornpipe - House dance - Hula - Hungarian dance

== I ==
Ice dancing - Illuminated dance floor - Imperial Society of Teachers of Dancing - Indian classical dance - Indonesian mask dance - Intermedio - International Dance Day - International Dance Organization - International Dance Teachers Association - International folk dance - Interpretive dance - Irish dance - Irish set dance - Italian ballet - Italian folk dance

== J ==
Jack and Jill (dance) - Jacob's Pillow Dance - Jamming (dance) - Japanese traditional dance - Javanese dance - Jeune Ballet de France - Jig - Joburg Ballet - Jumpstyle

== K ==
K-ballet - Kandyan dance - Kaosikii dance - Khener - Khigga - Kirov Academy of Ballet - Klompendansen - Kolo (dance) - Korea National Ballet - Korean dance - Kpanlogo - Krumping - Kuchipudi - Kumha Pyakhan dance - Kurdish dance

== L ==
Labanotation - Ländler - Latin dance - Lead and follow - Lezginka - Limbo - Line dance - Lion dance - Lipsi (dance) - Liturgical dance - Long Sword dance - Loure - Lyrical dance

=== List articles ===
Glossary of ballet - Glossary of dance moves - List of ballets by title - List of choreographers - List of Christian dance companies - List of dance companies - List of dance companies in Canada - List of dance occupations - List of dance organizations - List of dance people - List of dance personalities - List of dance style categories - List of dancewear - List of dancers - List of dances - List of ethnic, regional, and folk dances by origin - List of folk dance performance groups - List of folk dances of Odisha - List of historical ballet characters - List of Indian dances - List of Indian folk dances - List of national dances - List of National Museum of Dance Hall of Fame inductees - List of prima ballerinas - List of Russian ballet dancers - List of Scottish country dances - List of street and vernacular dances - List of theaters for dance - List of U.S. state dances - Timeline of ballet

== M ==
Maculelê (dance) - Majorette (dancer) - Mako (dance) - Manipuri dance - Mariinsky Ballet - Masque - Maxixe (dance) - Maya dance - Mazurka - Medal examinations (dance) - Medieval dance - Melbourne Shuffle - Mexcaltitán Ballet - Middle Eastern dance - Milonga (dance) - Minuet - Mixer dance - Modern dance - Modern western square dance - Molly dance - Moonwalk (dance) - Morris dance - Moscow Ballet - Moscow State Academy of Choreography - Motif description - Mozart and dance - Musicality

== N ==
Nantgarw tradition - Narrative ballet - Nati (dance) - National Ballet of Portugal - National Choreographers Initiative - National Museum of Dance and Hall of Fame - National Dance Day - National Association of Teachers of Dancing - Neoclassical ballet - Nervi International Ballet Festival - New Vogue (dance) - New York City Ballet - Niasse - Non-dance - Novelty and fad dances - The Nutcracker

== O ==
Oleg - Open position - Original Ballet Russe - Original dance

== P ==
Paint Dancing - Paquita - Paris Opera Ballet - Participation dance - Partner dance - Passamezzo - Passepied - Pavane - Peabody - Peacock dance - Persian dance - Peruvian dances - Petrushka (ballet) - Philippine dance - Physically integrated dance - Piva (dance) - Pogo - Pointe shoe - Pointe technique - Pole dance - Polish folk dances - Polka - Polonaise - Portable dance floor - Position of the arms in ballet - Positions of the feet in ballet - Postmodern dance - Prima ballerina assoluta - Principal dancer - Prix Benois de la Danse - Prix de Lausanne - Promenade position - Prophetic dance - Psychology of dance - Pulcinella (ballet) - Punjabi dance

== Q ==
Quadrille - Queensland Ballet - Queer Tango

== R ==
Rain dance - Rapper sword - Rave - Rebolation - Reel (dance) - Regency dance - Release technique - Répétiteur - Rigaudon - The Rite of Spring - Ritournelle - Romantic ballet - Round dance - Royal Academy of Dance - The Royal Ballet - Royal Ballet School - Royal Danish Ballet - Royal New Zealand Ballet - Royal Swedish Ballet - Royal Winnipeg Ballet - Russian ballet - Russian folk dances - Russian State Ballet of Siberia

== S ==
Sacred dance - Salsa (dance) - Saman (dance) - Samba (Brazilian dance) - Samba de Gafieira - Sarabande - Sardana - Scala Eisrevue - Scottish Ballet - Scottish country dance - Scottish highland dance - Scottish sword dances - Seguidilla - Sequence dance - Serpentine dance - Shakespearean dance - Short dance - Showgirl - Siciliana - Sirtaki - The Sleeping Beauty (ballet) - Slow dance - Social dance - Sock hop - Solo dance - Soloist (ballet) - Solomon Islands dance - Soviet ballroom dances - Spartacus (ballet) - Spiral dance - Spotting (dance technique) - Split leap - Square dance - Stave dancing - Step dance - Street dance - Sukhishvili Georgian National Ballet - Sun dance - Sundanese dance - Swan Lake - Swing (dance) - Sword dance - Syncopation

== T ==
Tambor (dance) - Tambourin - Tap dance - Tarantella - Taxi dance hall - Taxi dancer - Tea dance - Timeline of ballet - Tinikling - Tokyo Ballet - Tourdion - Traditional square dance - Traditional Vietnamese dance - Troika (dance) - Turkish Cypriot folk dances - Turkish dance - Turnout (ballet) - Tutu (clothing) - Twist - Types of modern dance

== U ==
Ukrainian dance - Universal Ballet - University of Dance and Circus

== V ==
Vaganova Academy of Russian Ballet - Variation (ballet) - Vernacular dance - Vienna State Ballet - Viennese waltz - Vintage dance - Virginia reel (dance) - Vogue (dance)

== W ==
Waltz - War dance - The Washington Ballet - Weapon dance - West Australian Ballet - Western stereotype of the male ballet dancer - Wheelchair Dance - Women in dance - World Ballet Day - World Dance Council - Worship dance

== X ==
Xibelani dance

== Y ==
Yacobson Ballet - Yemenite step

== Z ==
Zamba - Zapateado (Mexico) - Zapateado (Spain) - Zapin - Zapin Api - Zeibekiko - Zumba - Zydeco (dance)
