= Timeline of ballet =

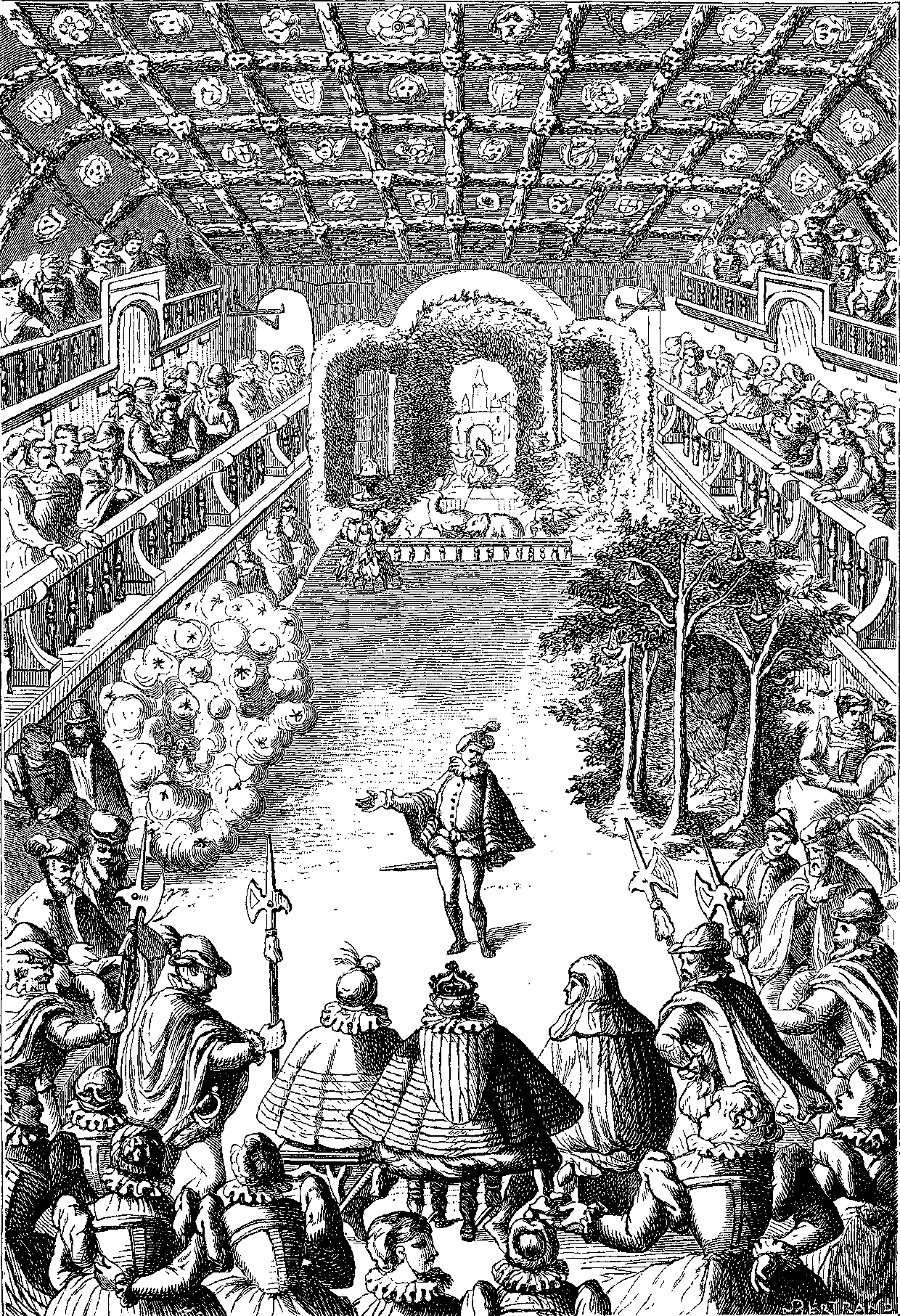
Engraving of the first scene of the Ballet Comique de la Reine, 1581.

A timeline of the history of ballet:

- 14th century
  - Medieval dance
- 15th century
- 16th century
  - Renaissance dance
  - Ballet de cour
  - Intermedio - Italian court spectaculars with dance
  - Ballet Comique de la Reine - sometimes called the "first ballet"
- 17th century
  - French ballet
  - Comédie-ballet
- 18th century
  - Baroque dance
  - Opéra-ballet
  - Ballet d'action
- 19th century
  - Classical ballet
    - Azerbaijani
    - British
    - French
    - Italian
    - Russian
  - Pre-romantic ballet
  - Romantic ballet
- 20th century
  - Modern ballet
  - Neoclassical ballet
  - Postmodern dance
  - Concert dance
  - Contemporary ballet
  - Post-structuralist ballet

== See also ==
- Ballet
- List of ballets by title
