= Delaye =

Delaye is a surname. Notable people with the surname include:

- Elisa Delaye-Fuchs (fl. 1872), Swiss composer and a Professor of Harmony at the Conservatoire de Musique de Genève
- Guy Delaye (1929–1986), French professional rugby league footballer
- Marguerite Delaye, French woman who fought during the siege of Montelimar by Admiral Coligny in April 1570
- Philippe Delaye (born 1975), French professional footballer
- Sacha Delaye (born 2002), French professional footballer

== See also ==
- Delay (disambiguation)
