= Hiplet =

Hiplet may refer to:

- Hiplet (dance style)
- Hiplet (haircut)
- A pejorative term for women with hip dips (trochanteric depression)
