= Flagging dance =

Performing art

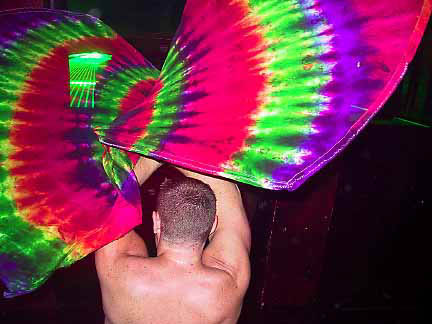
A flag dancer at a nightclub, circa 2001

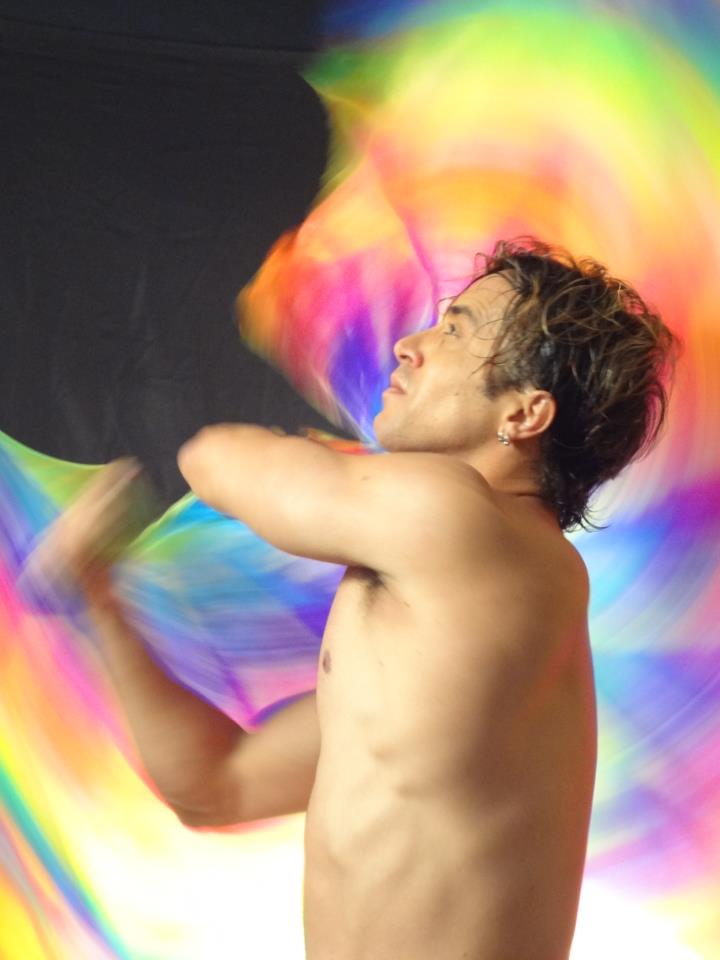
Example (2011)

Flagging dance is a performing art form often called "Flag Dancing", "Spin Flagging", "Flow Flagging", "flagging" and "Rag Spinning", but more commonly referred to as "Colorguard (Guard)". The flagging dance is the undulation, spinning and waving of flags in a rhythmic fashion with music. Practitioners of this form of performance art and dance are usually referred to as "Flaggers" and "Flag Dancers".

Although spinning Flags resembles the spinning of Poi, it is not a form of Poi. Poi originated with the Māori people of New Zealand while Flagging derived from Gay culture. Both developed independently from each other. The exact origins of Flagging are unclear, but it is thought to have started in gay clubs in the late 1970s and early 1980s.

== Origins ==
Modern-day flagging in the United States developed from fan dancing, which was prominent in the leather subculture and later circuit parties of Fire Island and Manhattan in the 1970s.

== Rebirth ==
People who flagged, performed a fan dance, or both, almost disappeared as AIDS took its toll on the community. By 1988 a few masters of these arts ensured they passed their tradition onto new members of the community. Adam Wojtowicz (flags) and Jeffrey Reichlin (fans) were two such performance artists in the New York area first seen at The Saint at Large. Three performed for Heritage of Pride in 1990, four in 1991. In 1996 thirty fan dancers and flaggers from the Northeast where ready to take rotations on stage at the annual Pride Dance on the Pier. San Francisco, where this art form began, was still recovering from its loses. Those who had not died, placed their toys away out of significant grief. AmFAR held a benefit in September 1997 at the Trocadero returning the dance to its birthplace.

== Flagger events ==
The Texas Flagger Weekend ran from 2003 to 2009. The event consisted of growing number of flaggers from around the world, peaking in 2008 with 80+ participants. The event had various tracks, from beginners to advanced. In later years, the Weekend expanded to include multiple tracks, a circuit party and a showcase of performances, SpinOut, of their own, inspired by the San Francisco events of the same name.

New York hosted the "World Symposium of Fanning and Flagging" in 2005 and included movement classes, creation workshops, and performances, mostly held at The LGBT Community Center in New York City, video by Wolfgang Busch.

Flagging In The Park (FITP), started in 1997, is a fundraising gathering of flaggers, flow artists, and their supporters, happening in the National AIDS Memorial Grove in Golden Gate Park. In 2002–2003 the event was produced in Dolores Park by Bryan Hughes; in 2005 the event moved back to the National AIDS Memorial Grove being led by Xavier Caylor; from 2014 to the present the event is being held by a group of flaggers from the Bay Area and beyond. One of the five events happens the last full weekend of July, on Saturday before the Up Your Alley Street Fair on Sunday, and is advertised as the (Flagger) SF Destination Weekend.

With so many in the community now calling Palm Springs home, 2018 was time to bring some of that magic to the desert. The Flagging in the Desert (FITD) was first held during PS Pride Weekend and then again in March 2019 with funds collected for local charities. Following the November 2019 event there were three FITD events planned for 2020. Following the February event COVID-19 impacted the schedule. The Desert Flaggers began monthly music videos involving first local flaggers and then expanding to flaggers across the country and around the world.

== See also ==
- Index of dance articles
- List of dances
- List of ethnic, regional, and folk dances by origin
- Outline of dance

== Sources ==
- Genre Magazine, June 2004
- New York Blade, February 6, 2004
- Edge Magazine, review of Flow Affair documentary by Jim Hauk, August 3, 2011.
- Xavier Caylor, Producer of Flagging In The Park 1999 to present, August 2018
