= World Ballet Day =

Annual celebration of ballet dancing

World Ballet Day is an annual celebration of ballet held since 2014 in October or November. It is a collaboration between major ballet companies around the world, which stream live video of their behind-the-scenes preparations in their respective time zones. Other companies and schools hold local celebrations. Lead co-producer is the Royal Opera House, Covent Garden, London.

The companies which contribute to the live stream are:

- The Australian Ballet
- Bolshoi Ballet
- The Royal Ballet
- The National Ballet of Canada
- San Francisco Ballet
- Royal Swedish Ballet

The date of World Ballet Day since its inception in 2014 has been:

- 1 October 2014
- 1 October 2015
- 4 October 2016
- 5 October 2017
- 2 October 2018
- 23 October 2019
- 29 October 2020
- 19 October 2021
- 2 November 2022
- 1 November 2023
- 12 November 2025
- 29 October 2026
