= Ballet =

Form of performance dance

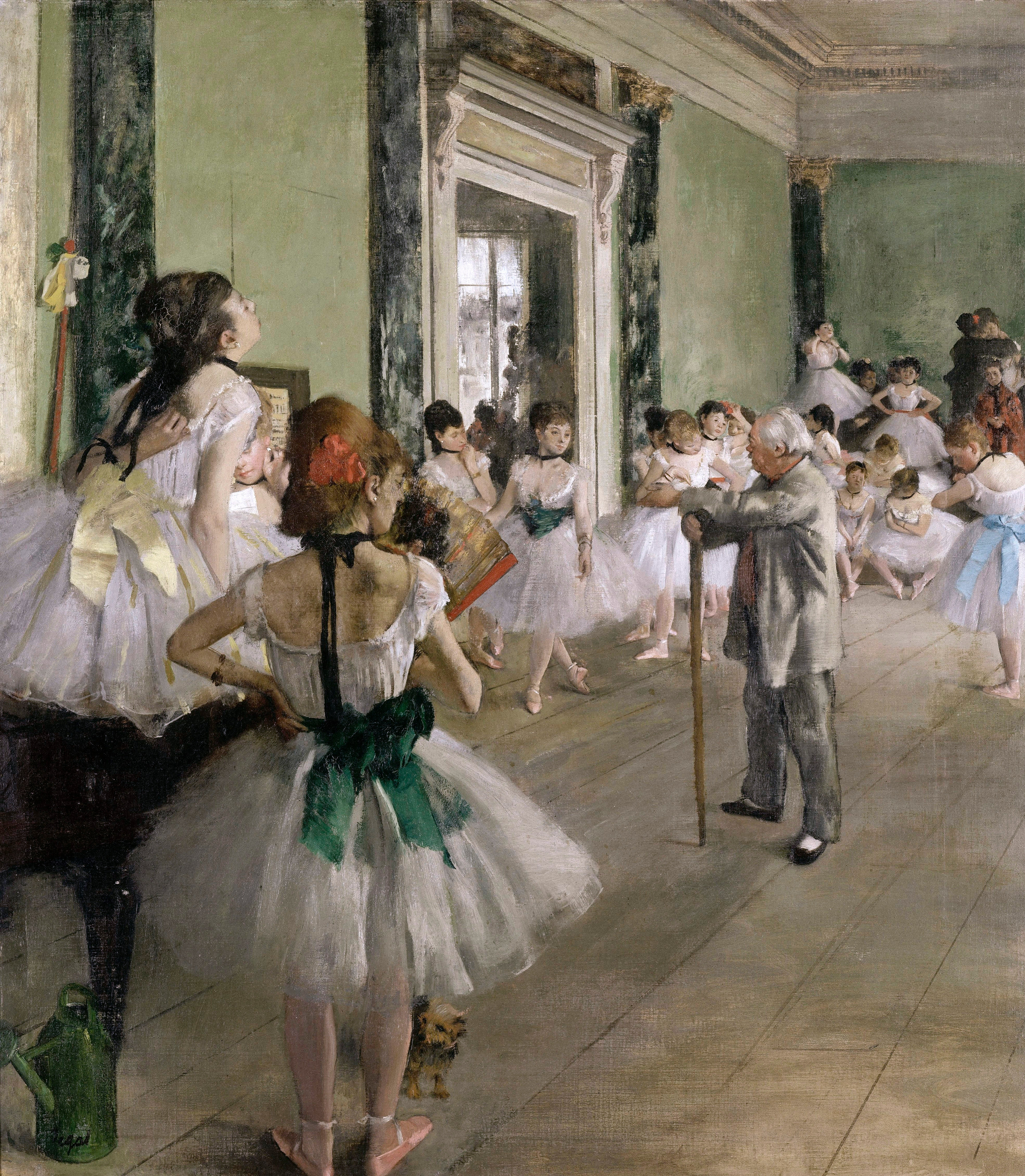
Classical bell tutus in The Ballet Class by Degas, 1874

Ballet (French: [balɛ]) is a type of performance dance that originated during the Italian Renaissance in the fifteenth century and later developed into a concert dance form in France and Russia. It has since become a widespread and highly technical form of dance with its own vocabulary. Ballet has been influential globally and has defined the foundational techniques which are used in many other dance genres and cultures. Various schools around the world have incorporated their own cultures. As a result, ballet has evolved in distinct ways.

A ballet as a unified work comprises the choreography and music for a ballet production. Ballets are choreographed and performed by trained ballet dancers. Traditional classical ballets are usually performed with classical music accompaniment and use elaborate costumes and staging, whereas modern ballets are often performed in simple costumes and without elaborate sets or scenery.

== Etymology ==
Ballet is a French word which had its origin in Italian balletto, a diminutive of ballo (dance) which comes from Latin ballo, ballare, meaning "to dance", which in turn comes from the Greek "βαλλίζω" (ballizo), "to dance, to jump about". The word came into English usage from the French around 1630.

In French, the word refers to a ballet performance, a ballet work, and possibly to the dance genre itself, although the expression danse classique also exists for the latter meaning, is less equivocal and is more commonly used when referring to the learning of this dance.

== History ==
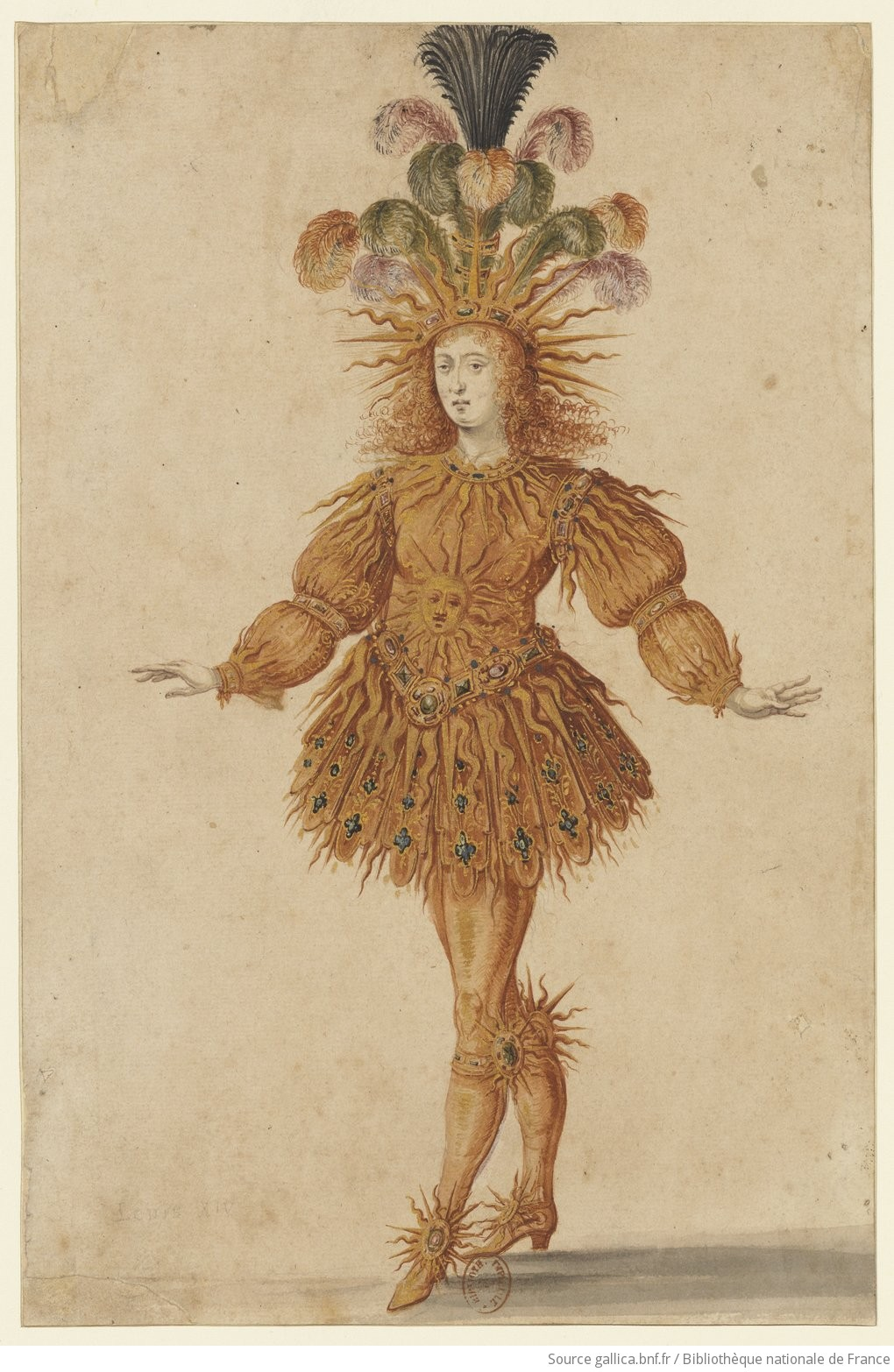
Louis XIV as Apollo in the Ballet Royal de la Nuit (1653)

Ballet originated in the Italian Renaissance courts of the fifteenth and sixteenth centuries. Under Catherine de' Medici's influence as Queen, it spread to France, where it developed even further. The dancers in these early court ballets were mostly noble amateurs. Ornamented costumes were meant to impress viewers, but they restricted performers' freedom of movement.

The ballets were performed in large chambers with viewers on three sides. The implementation of the proscenium arch from 1618 on distanced performers from audience members, who could then better view and appreciate the technical feats of the professional dancers in the productions.

French court ballet reached its height under the reign of King Louis XIV. Louis founded the Académie Royale de Danse (Royal Dance Academy) in 1661 to establish standards and certify dance instructors. In 1672, Louis XIV made Jean-Baptiste Lully the director of the Académie Royale de Musique (Paris Opera) from which the first professional ballet company, the Paris Opera Ballet, arose. Pierre Beauchamp served as Lully's ballet-master. Together their partnership would drastically influence the development of ballet, as evidenced by the credit given to them for the creation of the five major positions of the feet. By 1681, the first "ballerinas" took the stage following years of training at the Académie.

Ballet started to decline in France after 1830, but it continued to develop in Denmark, Italy, and Russia. The arrival in Europe of the Ballets Russes led by Sergei Diaghilev on the eve of the First World War revived interest in the ballet and started the modern era.

In the twentieth century, ballet had a wide influence on other dance genres, Also in the twentieth century, ballet took a turn dividing it from classical ballet to the introduction of modern dance, leading to modernist movements in several countries.

Famous dancers of the twentieth century include Mikhail Baryshnikov, Erik Bruhn, Maria Tall Chief, Jeanne Devereaux, Suzanne Farrell, Margot Fonteyn, Rosella Hightower, Gelsey Kirkland, Natalia Makarova, Arthur Mitchell, Rudolf Nureyev, Anna Pavlova, Maya Plisetskaya, and Galina Ulanova.

== Styles ==
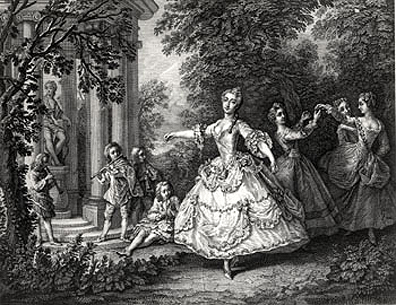
Marie Sallé, classical ballet dancer

Stylistic variations and subgenres have evolved over time. Early, classical variations are primarily associated with geographic origin. Examples of this are Russian ballet, French ballet, and Italian ballet. Later variations, such as contemporary ballet and neoclassical ballet, incorporate both classical ballet and non-traditional technique and movement. Perhaps the most widely known and performed ballet style is late Romantic ballet (or Ballet blanc).

=== Classical ballet ===
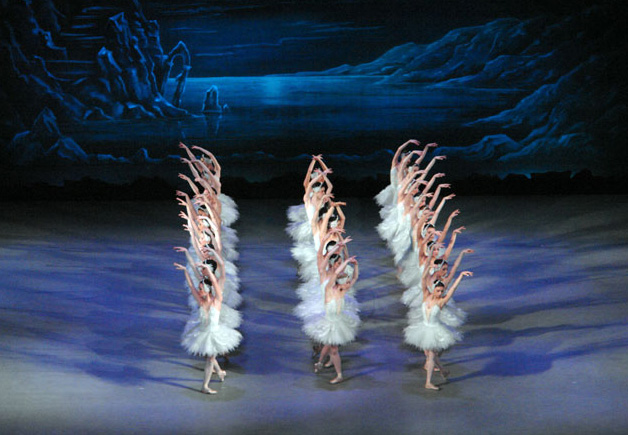
The Valse des cygnes from Act II of the Ivanov/Petipa edition of Swan Lake

Classical ballet is based on traditional ballet technique and vocabulary. Different styles have emerged in different countries, such as French ballet, Italian ballet, English ballet, and Russian ballet. Several of the classical ballet styles are associated with specific training methods, typically named after their creators (see below). The Royal Academy of Dance method is a ballet technique and training system that was founded by a diverse group of ballet dancers. They merged their respective dance methods (Italian, French, Danish and Russian) to create a new style of ballet that is unique to the organization and is recognized internationally as the English style of ballet. Some examples of classical ballet productions are: Swan Lake, The Sleeping Beauty and The Nutcracker.

=== Romantic ballet ===
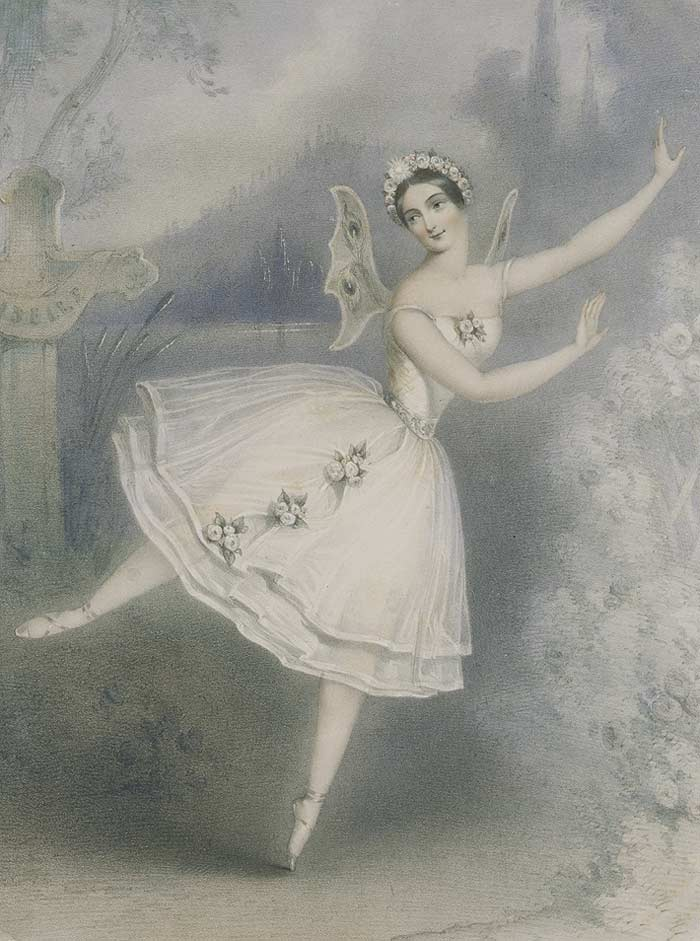
Carlotta Grisi, the original Giselle, 1841, wearing the romantic tutu

Romantic ballet was an artistic movement of classical ballet and several productions remain in the classical repertoire today. The Romantic era was marked by the emergence of pointe work, the dominance of female dancers, and longer, flowy tutus that attempt to exemplify softness and a delicate aura. This movement occurred during the early to mid-nineteenth century (the Romantic era) and featured themes that emphasized intense emotion as a source of aesthetic experience. The plots of many romantic ballets revolved around spirit women (sylphs, wilis, and ghosts) who enslaved the hearts and senses of mortal men. The 1827 ballet La Sylphide is widely considered to be the first, and the 1870 ballet Coppélia is considered to be the last. Famous ballet dancers of the Romantic era include Marie Taglioni, Fanny Elssler, and Jules Perrot. Jules Perrot is also known for his choreography, especially that of Giselle, often considered to be the most widely celebrated romantic ballet.

=== Neoclassical ballet ===
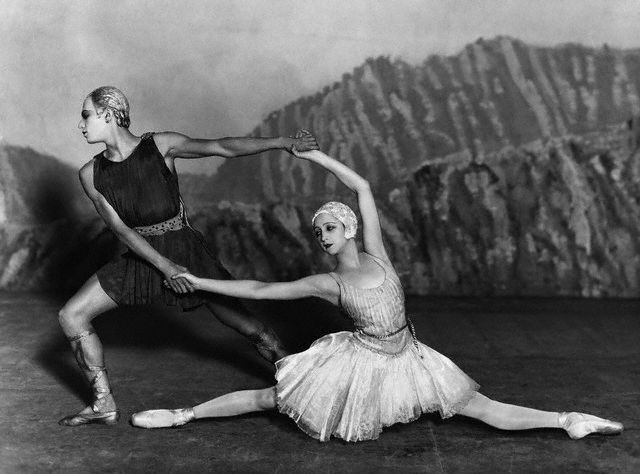
Alexandra Danilova and Serge Lifar, Apollon Musagète, 1928

Neoclassical ballet is usually abstract, with no clear plot, costumes or scenery. Music choice can be diverse and will often include music that is also neoclassical (e.g. Stravinsky, Roussel). Tim Scholl, author of From Petipa to Balanchine, considers George Balanchine's Apollo in 1928 to be the first neoclassical ballet. Apollo represented a return to form in response to Sergei Diaghilev's abstract ballets. Balanchine worked with modern dance choreographer Martha Graham, and brought modern dancers into his company such as Paul Taylor, who in 1959 performed in Balanchine's Episodes.

While Balanchine is widely considered the face of neoclassical ballet, there were others who made significant contributions. Frederick Ashton's Symphonic Variations (1946) is a seminal work for the choreographer. Set to César Franck's score of the same title, it is a pure-dance interpretation of the score.

Another form, Modern Ballet, also emerged as an offshoot of neoclassicism. Among the innovators in this form were Glen Tetley, Robert Joffrey and Gerald Arpino. While difficult to parse modern ballet from neoclassicism, the work of these choreographers favored a greater athleticism that departed from the delicacy of ballet. The physicality was more daring, with mood, subject matter and music more intense. An example of this would be Joffrey's Astarte (1967), which featured a rock score and sexual overtones in the choreography.

=== Contemporary ballet ===
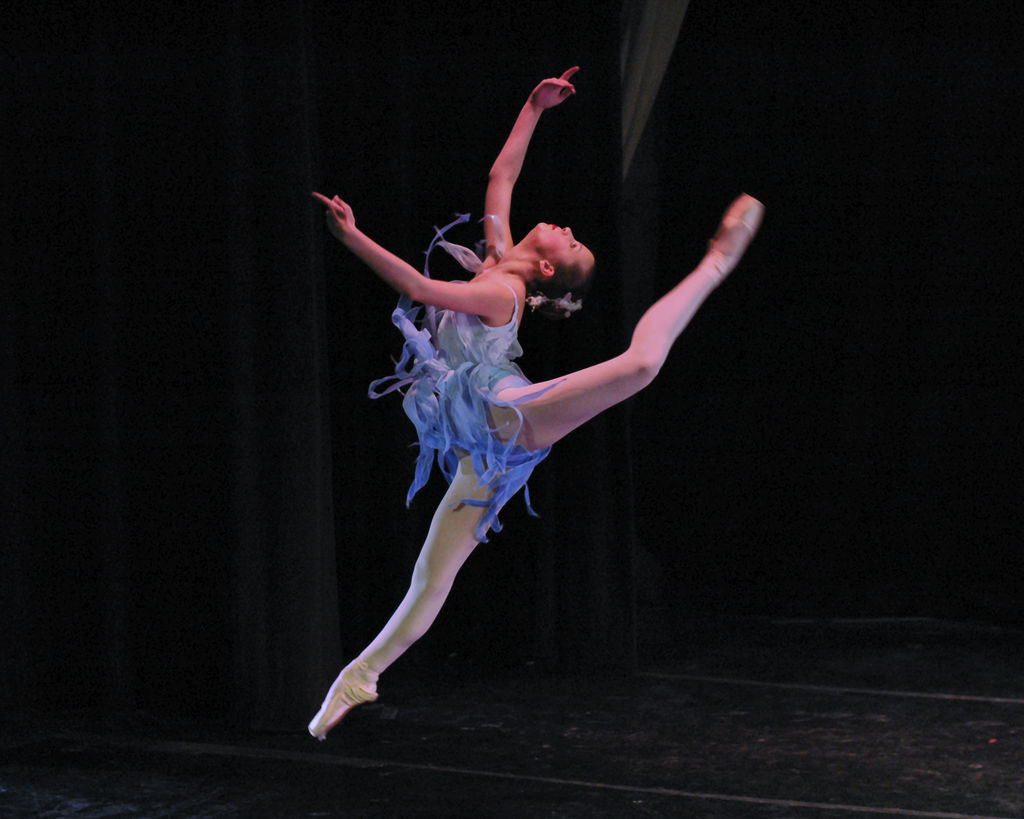
A ballet jump performed with modern, non-classical form in a contemporary ballet

This ballet style is often performed barefoot. Contemporary ballets may include mime and acting, and are usually set to music (typically orchestral but occasionally vocal). It can be difficult to differentiate this form from neoclassical or modern ballet. Contemporary ballet is also close to contemporary dance because many contemporary ballet concepts come from the ideas and innovations of twentieth-century modern dance, including floor work and turn-in of the legs. The main distinction is that ballet technique is essential to perform a contemporary ballet.

George Balanchine is considered to have been a pioneer of contemporary ballet. Another early contemporary ballet choreographer, Twyla Tharp, choreographed Push Comes To Shove for the American Ballet Theatre in 1976, and in 1986 created In The Upper Room for her own company. Both of these pieces were considered innovative for their melding of distinctly modern movements with the use of pointe shoes and classically trained dancers.

Today there are many contemporary ballet companies and choreographers. These include Alonzo King and his company LINES Ballet; Matthew Bourne and his company New Adventures; Complexions Contemporary Ballet; Nacho Duato and his Compañia Nacional de Danza; William Forsythe and The Forsythe Company; and Jiří Kylián of the Nederlands Dans Theater. Traditionally "classical" companies, such as the Mariinsky (Kirov) Ballet and the Paris Opera Ballet, also regularly perform contemporary works.

The term ballet has evolved to include all forms associated with it. Someone training as a ballet dancer will now be expected to perform neoclassical, modern and contemporary work. A ballet dancer is expected to be able to be stately and regal for classical work, free and lyrical in neoclassical work, and unassuming, harsh or pedestrian for modern and contemporary work. In addition, there are several modern varieties of dance that fuse classical ballet technique with contemporary dance, such as Hiplet, that require dancers to be practised in non-Western dance styles.

== Technical methods of ballet instruction ==
There are six widely used, internationally recognized methods to teach or study ballet. These methods are the French School, the Vaganova Method, the Cecchetti Method, the Bournonville method, the Royal Academy of Dance method (English style), and the Balanchine method (American style). Many more schools of technique exist in various countries.

Although preschool-age children are a lucrative source of income for a ballet studio, ballet instruction is generally not appropriate for young children. Initial instruction requires standing still and concentrating on posture, rather than dancing. Because of this, many ballet programs have historically not accepted students until approximately age 8. Creative movement and non-demanding pre-ballet classes are recommended as alternatives for children.

=== French method ===
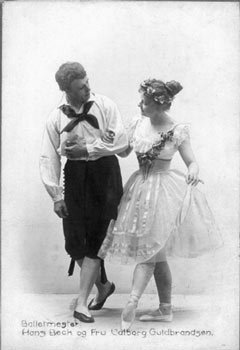

The French method is the basis of all ballet training. When Louis XIV created the Académie Royale de Danse in 1661, he helped to create the codified technique still used today by those in the profession, regardless of what method of training they adhere to. The French school was particularly revitalized under Rudolf Nureyev, in the 1980s. His influence revitalized and renewed appreciation for this style, and has drastically shaped ballet as a whole. In fact, the French school is now sometimes referred to as Nureyev school. The French method is often characterized by technical precision, fluidity and gracefulness, and elegant, clean lines. For this style, fast footwork is often utilized in order to give the impression that the performers are drifting lightly across the stage. Two important trademarks of this technique are the specific way in which the port de bras and the épaulement are performed, more rounded than when dancing in a Russian style, but not as rounded as the Danish style.

=== Vaganova method ===
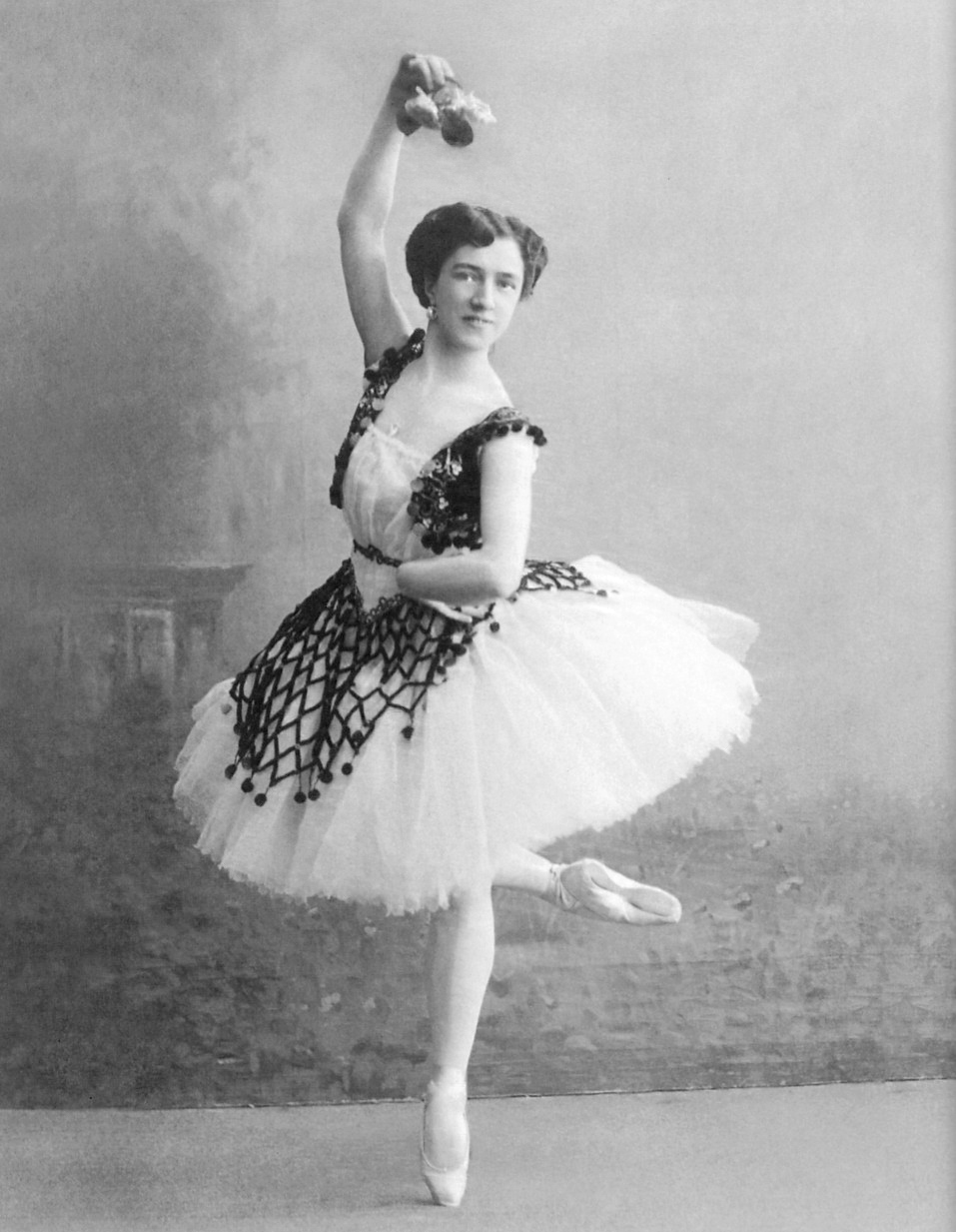
Agrippina Vaganova, "Esmeralda" 1910

The Vaganova method is a style of ballet training that emerged from Russian ballet, created by Agrippina Vaganova. After retiring from dance in 1916, Vaganova turned to teaching at the Leningrad Choreographic School in 1921. Her training method is now internationally recognized and her book, The Fundamentals of Classical Dance (1934), is a classic reference. This method is marked by the fusion of the classical French style, specifically elements from the Romantic era, with the athleticism of the Italian method, and the soulful passion of Russian ballet. She developed an extremely precise method of instruction in her book Basic Principles of Russian Classical dance (1948). This includes outlining when to teach technical components to students in their ballet careers, for how long to focus on it, and the right amount of focus at each stage of the student's career. These textbooks continue to be extremely important to the instruction of ballet today.

The method emphasizes development of strength, flexibility, and endurance for the proper performance of ballet. She espoused the belief that equal importance should be placed on the arms and legs while performing ballet, as this will bring harmony and greater expression to the body as a whole.

=== Cecchetti method ===
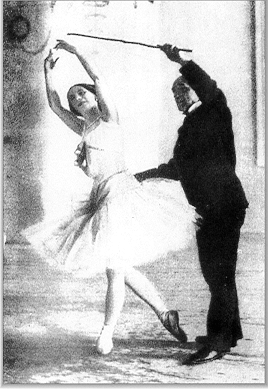
Enrico Cecchetti with Anna Pavlova

Developed by Enrico Cecchetti (1850–1928), this method is one known internationally for its intense reliance of the understanding of anatomy as it relates to classical ballet. The goal of this method is to instill important characteristics for the performance of ballet into students so that they do not need to rely on imitations of teachers. Important components for this method is the emphasis of balance, elevations, ballon, poise, and strength.

This method espouses the importance of recognizing that all parts of the body move together to create beautiful, graceful lines, and as such cautions against thinking of ballet in terms of the arms, legs, and neck and torso as separate parts. This method is well known for eight port de bras that are utilized.

=== Bournonville method ===
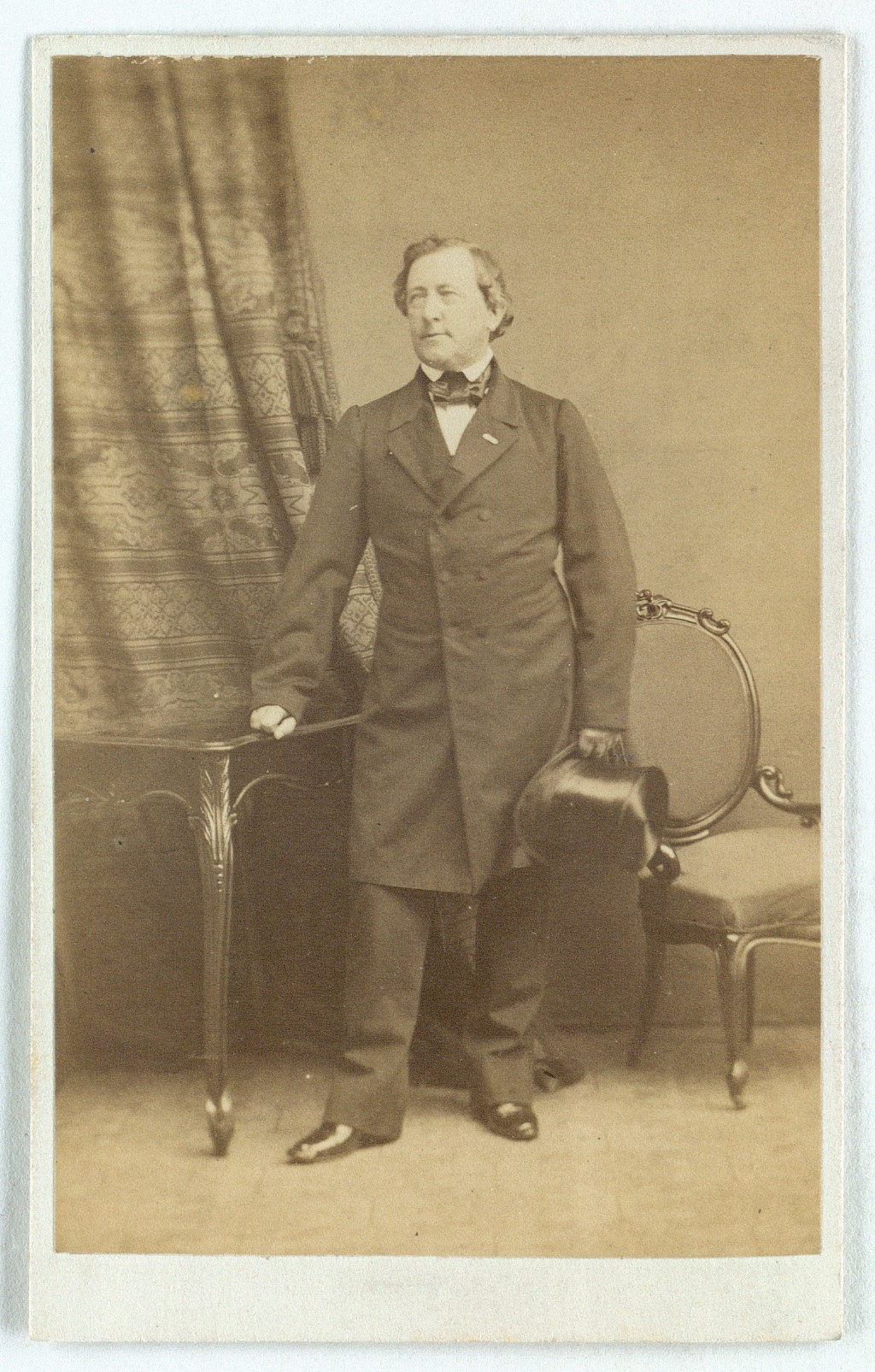
August Bournonville

The Bournonville method is a Danish method first devised by August Bournonville. Bournonville was heavily influenced by the early French ballet method due to his training with his father, Antoine Bournonville and other important French ballet masters. This method has many style differences that differentiate it from other ballet methods taught today. A key component is the use of diagonal épaulements, with the upper body turning towards the working foot typically. This method also incorporates very basic use of arms, pirouettes from a low développé position into seconde, and use of fifth position bras en bas for the beginning and end of movements.

The Bournonville method produces dancers who have beautiful ballon ("the illusion of imponderable lightness").

=== The Royal Academy of Dance method (RAD) ===
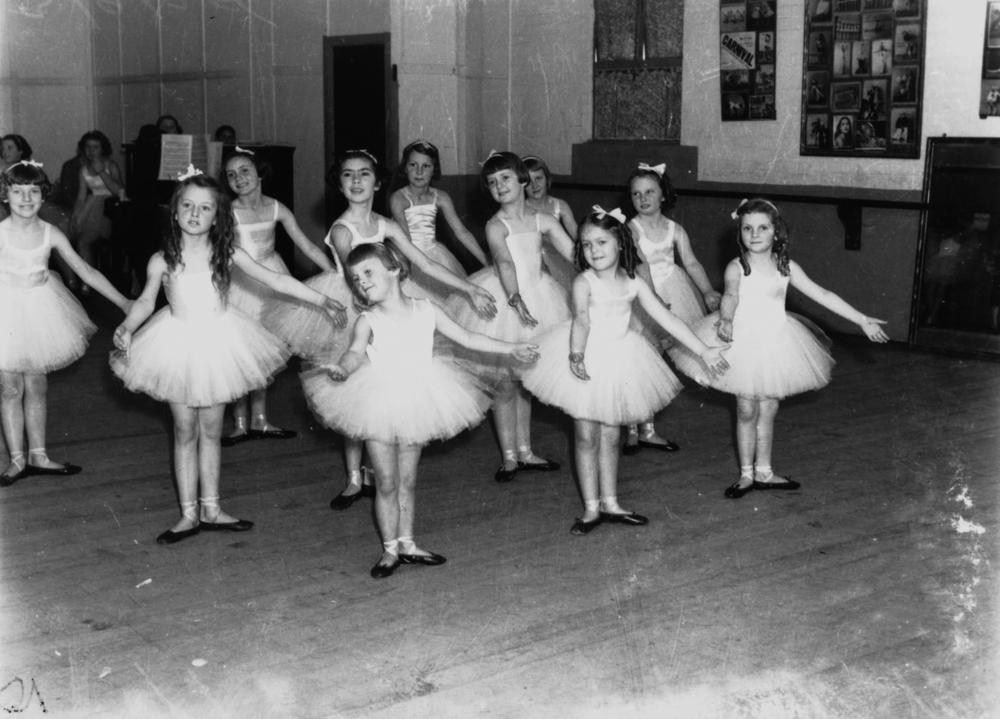
Young girls competing at the Royal Academy of Dancing (London) exams held in Brisbane and Toowoomba, 1938

The Royal Academy of Dance method, also referred to as the English style of ballet, was established in 1920 by Genee, Karsavina, Bedells, E Espinosa, and Richardson. The goal of this method is to promote academic training in classical ballet throughout Great Britain. This style also spread to the United States, and is widely utilized still today. There are specific grade levels which a student must move through in order to complete training in this method. The key principle behind this method of instruction is that basic ballet technique must be taught at a slow pace, with difficulty progression often much slower than the rest of the methods. The idea behind this is if a student is to put in a large amount of effort into perfecting the basic steps, the technique learned in these steps allow a student to utilize harder ones at a much easier rate.

=== Balanchine method ===
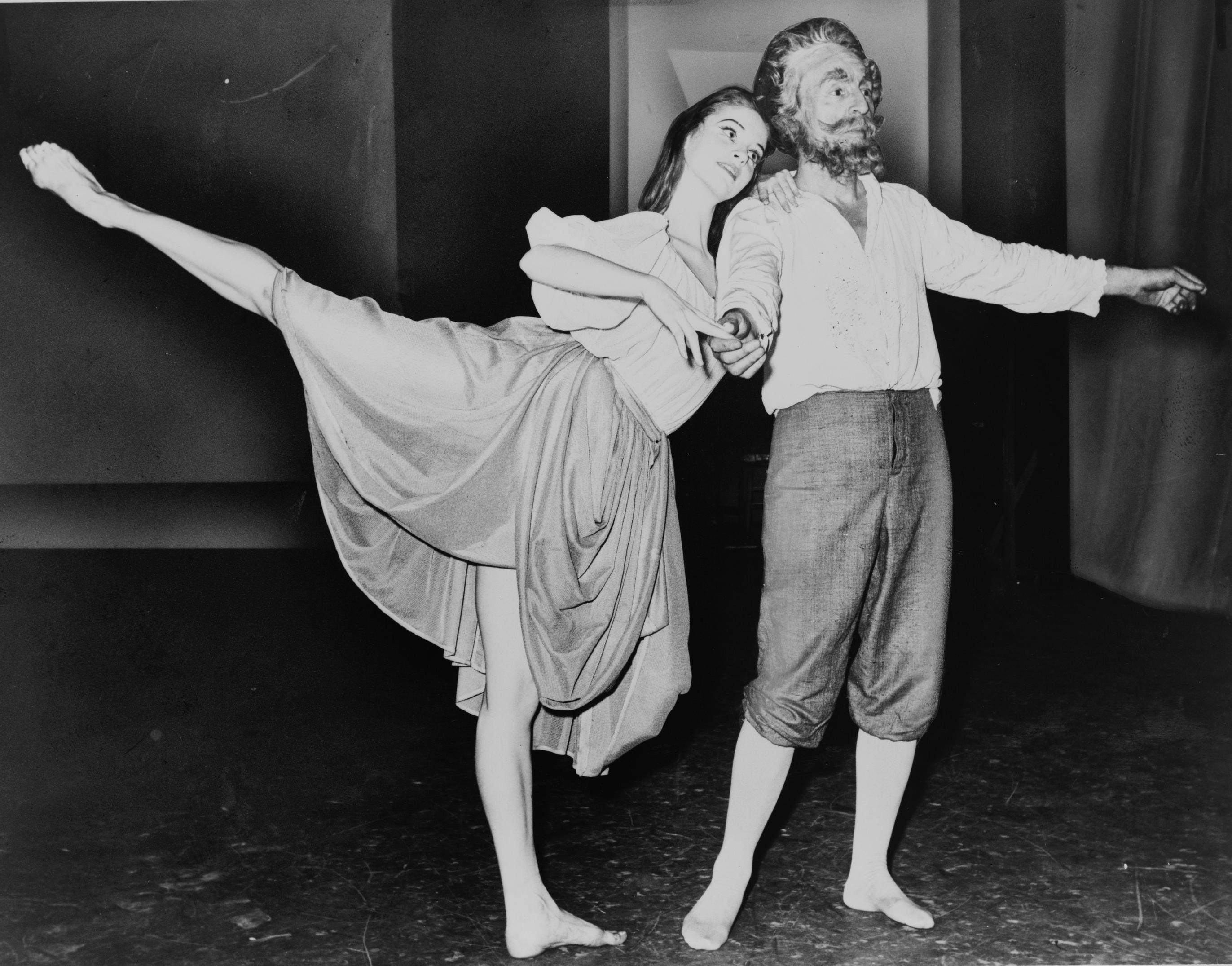
Suzanne Farrell and George Balanchine dancing in a segment of "Don Quixote" at New York State Theater

Developed by George Balanchine at the New York City Ballet. His method draws heavily on his own training as a dancer in Russia. The technique is known for extreme speed throughout routines, emphasis on lines, and deep pliés. Perhaps one of the most well known differences of this style is the unorthodox positioning of the body. Dancers of this style often have flexed hands and even feet, and are placed in off-balance positions. Important ballet studios teaching this method are the Miami City Ballet, Ballet Chicago Studio company, and the School of American Ballet in New York.

== Costumes ==
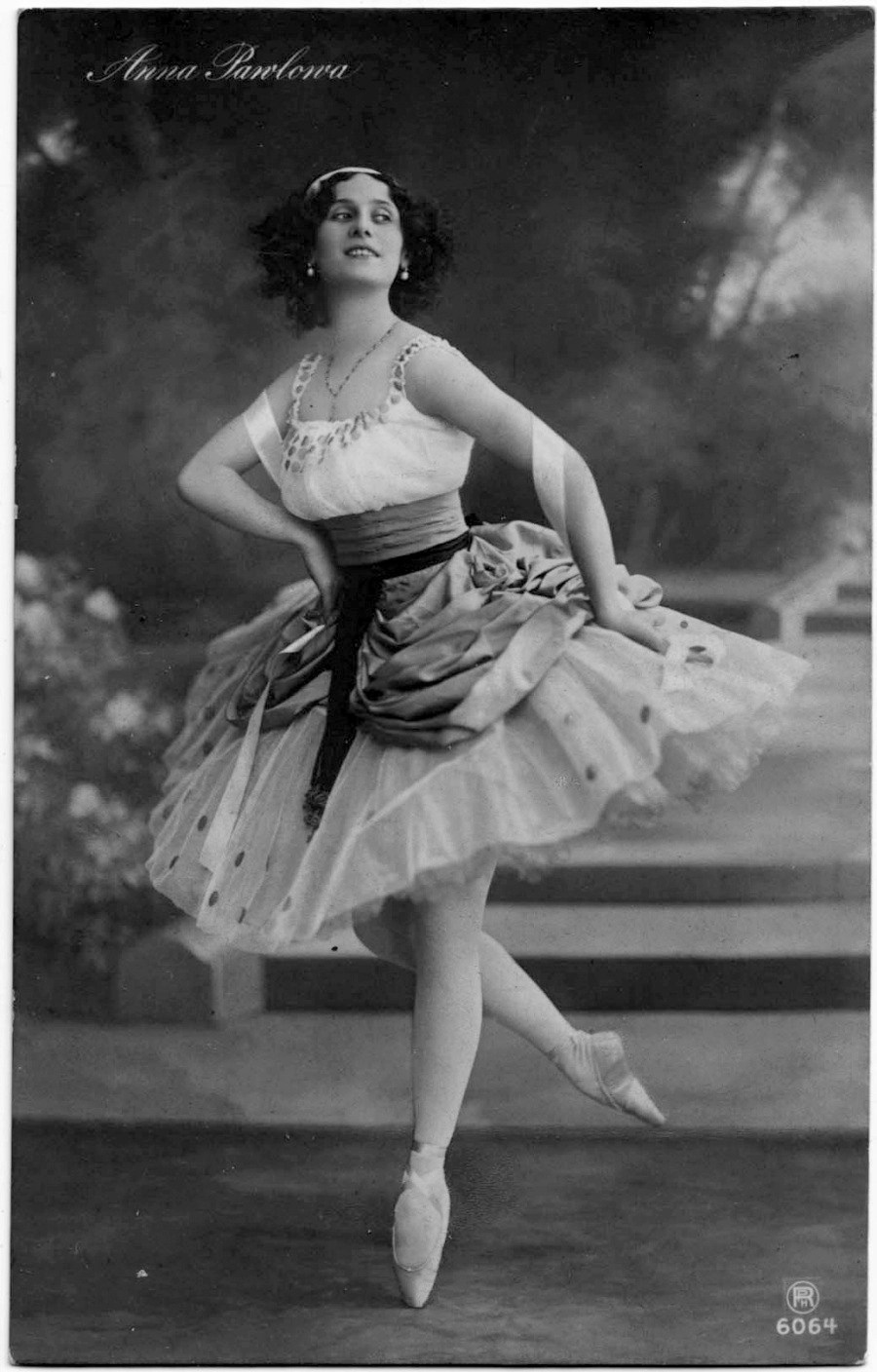
Anna Pavlova (prima ballerina). Early materials for ballet costumes were heavy, hindering the dancer's movements.

Ballet costumes play an important role in the ballet community. They are often the only survival of a production, representing a living imaginary picture of the scene.

=== Renaissance and Baroque ===
The roots of ballet go back to the Renaissance in France and Italy when court wear was the beginning of ballet costumes. Ballet costumes have been around since the early 15th century. Cotton and silk were mixed with flax, woven into semitransparent gauze to create exquisite ballet costumes.

=== 17th century ===
During the 17th century, different types of fabrics and designs were used to make costumes more spectacular and eye catching. Court dress still remained for women during this century. Silks, satins and fabrics embroidered with real gold and precious stones increased the level of spectacular decoration associated with ballet costumes. Women's costumes also consisted of heavy garments and knee-long skirts which made it difficult for them to create much movement and gesture.

=== 18th century ===
During the 18th century, stage costumes were still very similar to court wear but progressed over time, mostly due to the French dancer and ballet-master Jean-Georges Noverre (1727–1810) whose proposals to modernize ballet are contained in his revolutionary Lettres sur la danse et les ballets (1760). Noverre's book altered the emphasis in a production away from the costumes towards the physical movements and emotions of the dancers.

European ballet was centered in the Paris Opera. During this era, skirts were raised a few inches off the ground. Flowers, flounces, ribbons, and lace emphasized this opulent feminine style, as soft pastel tones in citron, peach, pink, and pistachio dominated the color range.

=== 19th century ===
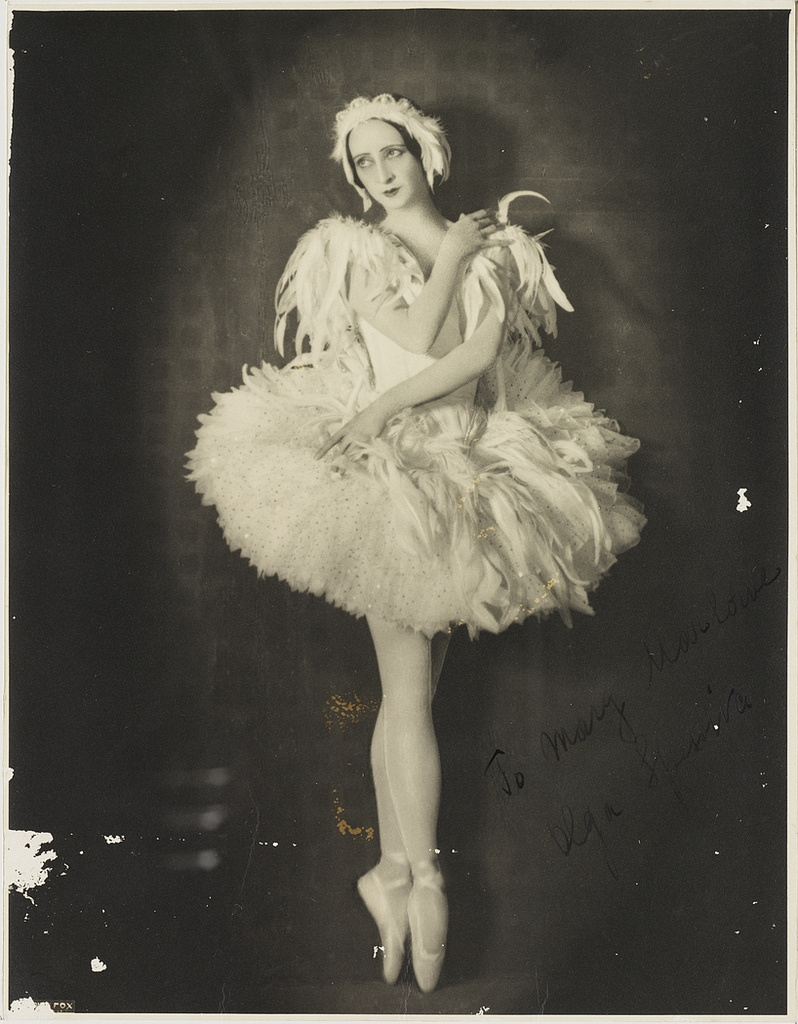
Olga Spessiva; Swan Lake Costume in the 20th century

During the early 19th century, close-fitting body costumes, floral crowns, corsages, and jewels were used. Ideals of Romanticism were reflected through female movements.

Costumes became much tighter as corsets started to come into use, to show off the curves on a ballerina. Jewels and bedazzled costumes became much more popular.

=== 20th century ===
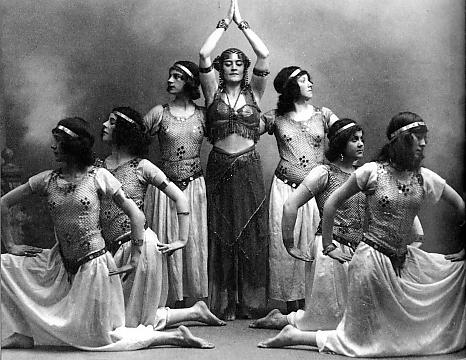
Maggie Gripenberg (in the middle) performing at the Finnish National Theatre in 1916

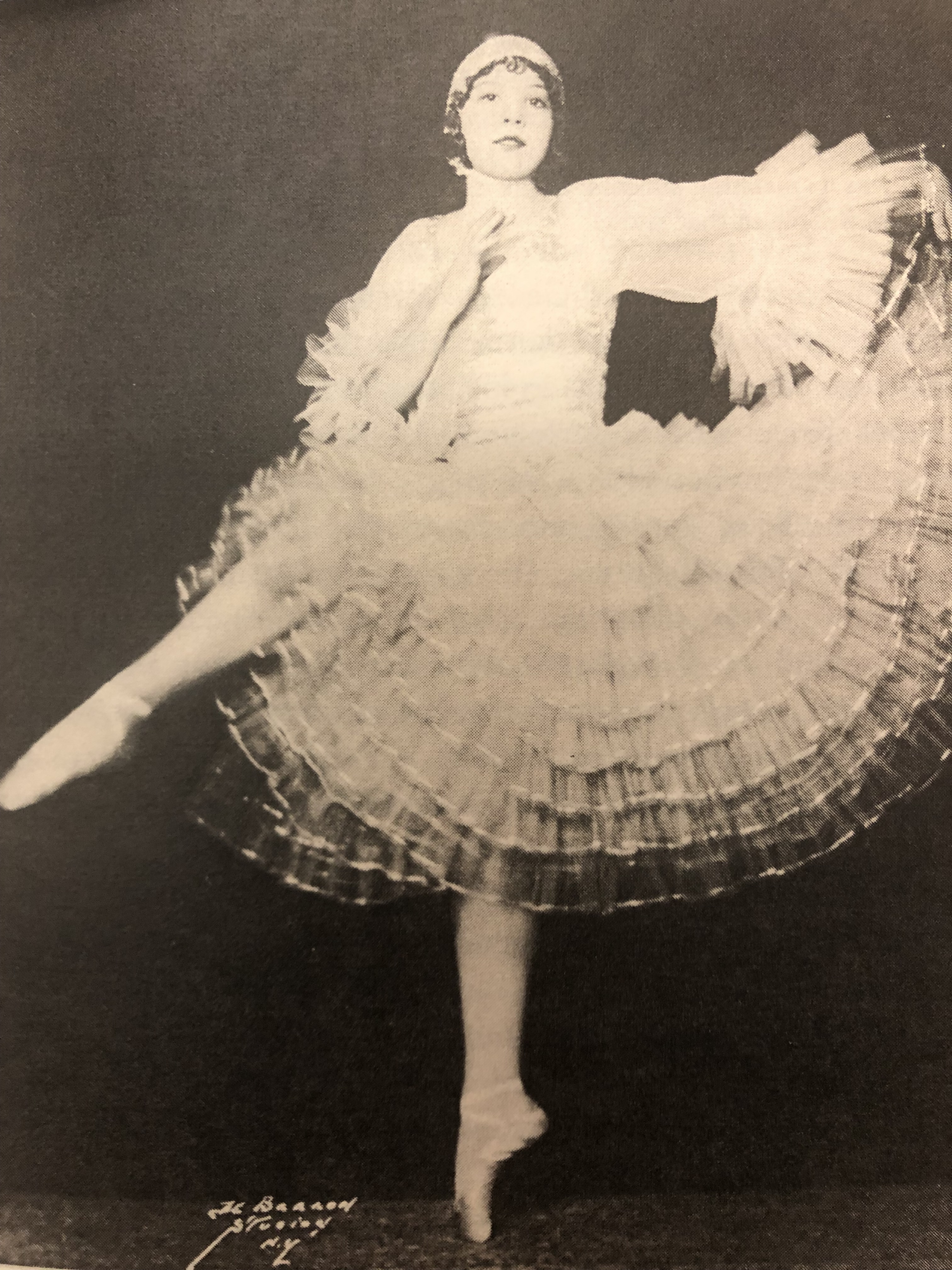
Jeanne Devereaux (1912–2011) was a prima ballerina, starting as a child star at age 11, and continuing for the next four decades. In 1935, she performed in front of King George V and Queen Mary in a Royal Command Performance. No other American prima ballerina before had been asked to perform at such a prestigious event.

During the 20th century, ballet costumes transitioned back to the influence of Russian ballet. Ballerina skirts became knee-length tutus, later on in order to show off their precise pointe work. Colors used on stage costumes also became much more vibrant. Designers used colors such as red, orange, yellow, etc. to create visual expression when ballet dancers perform on stage.

== Ballet as a career ==
Professional dancers are generally not well paid, and earn less money than a typical worker. As of 2020, American dancers (including ballet and other dance forms) were paid an average of US$19 per hour, with pay somewhat better for teachers than for performers.

The job outlook is not strong, and the competition to get a job is intense, with the number of applicants vastly exceeding the number of job openings. Most jobs involve teaching in private dance schools.

Choreographers are paid better than dancers. Musicians and singers are paid better per hour than either dancers or choreographers, about US$30 per hour; however, full-time work is unusual for musicians.

== Health effects ==
Teenage girl ballet dancers are prone to stress fractures in the first rib. Posterior ankle impingement syndrome (PAIS) most commonly affects people who perform repetitive plantar flexion, such as ballet dancers. Eating disorders are thought to be common, and a 2014 meta-analysis suggests that studies do indicate that ballet dancers are at higher risk than the general population for several kinds of eating disorders. In addition, some researchers have noted that intensive training in ballet results in lower bone mineral density in the arms.

== Criticism ==
Most ballet choreography is written so that it can only be performed by a relatively young dancer. The structure of ballet – in which a (usually) male choreographer or director uses (mostly) women's bodies to express his artistic vision, has been criticized as harming women.

== See also ==
- Ballet dancer
- Ballet glossary
- Ballet pointe shoe
- Ballet-related lists
- Dance and health
- List of ballets by title
- Western stereotype of the male ballet dancer
