= Elisa Delaye-Fuchs =

Swiss composer

Elisa Delaye-Fuchs (var. Fuchs, Delaye, Fuchs-Delaye) (1872–?) was a Swiss composer and a Professor of Harmony at the Conservatoire de Musique de Genève. Although prolific in her output she is very little known today.

== Life ==
She was married to the Russian-born Georges Delaye (1863–1949), a flutist, a composer and a professor at the Conservatoire de Musique de Genève.

== Works ==
=== Organ ===
- Op.21. Ave Maria
- Op.24. Jour de fête
- Op.25. Pièce en La bémol majeur

=== Piano duet ===
- Op.27. Impressions de voyage

=== Piano solo ===
- Op.1. Berceuse et Gavotte
- Op.3. Huit pièces pour piano
- Op.4/1. Suite No.1: Temps d'automn
- Op.4/2. Suite No.2: Un, deux, trois
- Op.5. Impromptu'
- Op.8. Sonatine
- Op.9. Sonate en la majeur
- Op.10. Sonatine pour piano en ut majeur
- Op.16. Sonatine en sol majeur
- Op.30. Simple valse'
- Op.33 Suite: A la montagne
- Op. 45. Pour la jeunesse

=== Songs for solo voice ===
- Op.11. Ritournelle
- Op.15. Rondeau

=== Songs: for two voices ===
- Op.2. Adoration
- Op.119. Canetons et poussin
- Op1.121. Lapin et mésange
- Op.122. Petite pomme rouge
- Op.123. Le Club alpin des escargots
- Op.130. Quand les chats mangent du pain
- Op.134. Oh! La bonne dinette'

=== Theoretical works ===
- Op. 22. Cours de lecture rythmique.
