= Delay =

Delay or DeLay may refer to:

== People ==
- B. H. DeLay (1891–1923), American aviator and movie stunt pilot
- Dorothy DeLay (1917–2002), American violin instructor
- Florence Delay (1941–2025), French writer, translator, and actress, daughter of Jean
- Jan Delay, stage name of German musician Jan Phillip Eißfeldt (born 1976)
- Jason Delay (born 1995), American baseball player
- Jean Delay (1907–1987), French psychiatrist, neurologist, and writer
- Paul deLay (1952–2007), American blues musician
- Tom DeLay (born 1947), American politician
- Tom Delay (businessman) (born 1959), British businessman
- Vladislav Delay (born 1976), Finnish musician

== Other uses ==
- Delay (audio effect), a technology for producing delayed playback of an audio signal
- Delay (programming), a programming language construct for delaying evaluation of an expression
- Delay 1968 or Delay, a 1981 compilation album by German experimental rock band Can
- The Delay, a 2012 Uruguayan film

== See also ==
- Delays, an English indie band
- Delaye
