= Entrée de ballet =

An entrée de ballet ("ballet entrance") is an autonomous scene of ballet de cour, divertissement, comédie-ballet, opéra-ballet, even tragédie lyrique, which brings together several dancers in and out of the scenario.

In the seventeenth and eighteenth centuries, baroque dance distinguished several types of entrances, according to their character and step style: serious, severe, comical or grotesque. In his recueil de danses, Raoul Auger Feuillet qualified the entrances he described according to the number of characters and sometimes their sex: entrance alone, entrance of a woman, entrance for two, etc.

This choreographic form disappeared in the 1720s.
