= Ballon (ballet) =

Appearance of being lightweight while jumping

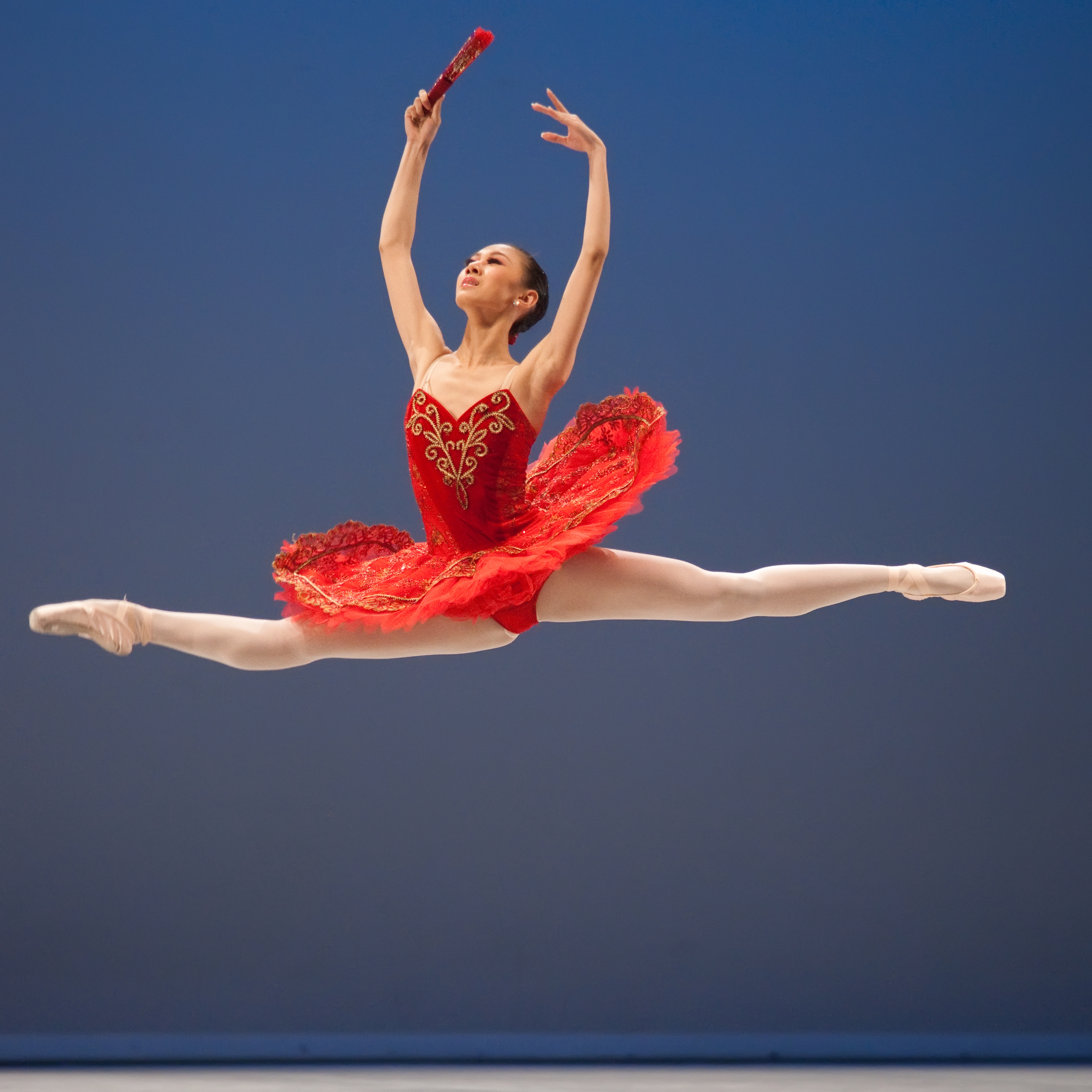
A ballerina appears to be suspended in the air during a grand jeté.

Ballon (French pronunciation: [balɔ̃]) is the appearance of being lightweight and light-footed while jumping. It is a desirable aesthetic in ballet and other dance genres, making it seem as though a dancer effortlessly becomes airborne, floats in the air, and lands softly. The name is widely thought to be derived from the French word ballon (meaning "balloon"), though it has been dubiously claimed that the name was inspired by French ballet danseur Claude Balon, who was known for performing exceptionally light leaps.

== Physics ==
A dancer will appear to defy the laws of physics when ballon is exhibited effectively. For example, during a grand jeté, the dancer may appear to hover in the air. Physically, the dancer's center of mass follows a ballistic trajectory, as does any projectile, but observers have limited ability to reckon center of mass when a projectile changes its configuration in flight. By raising the arms and legs while ascending and lowering them while descending, the dancer alters the apparent path of the center of mass and, in so doing, seems to observers to be momentarily floating in the air.

Dancers strive to exhibit ballon in large jumps as well as in small, quick jumps such as petite allegro steps. For example, ballon is a characteristic of pas de chat. The dancer starts from a plié (bent knees) and then, during the ascending phase of the step, lifts each knee in succession with hips turned out, so that for a moment both feet are in the air and the dancer appears to be suspended in air. To give the appearance of lightness when landing, the dancer pliés and rolls the foot from toe to heel.
