= Paint Dancing =

American art and dance craze

Paint Dancing is an American art and dance craze which involves both painting and dancing. Paint Dancers, using paint, brushes and paper, attend organized events dressed in ready-to-paint and dance clothing. The concept of combining movement and painting originated during the later part of the American and European Modern art period; however, Evangeline Welch of Shreveport, Louisiana has been credited with being the "brainchild" of Paint Dancing in the United States of America. This departure from traditional painting styles was often referred to as Action painting. Over the years, several variations of the art form have evolved, including an adaptation introduced by the Hippies during the Summer of Love, that integrated the art of body painting with dancing. One of the more recent introductions of Paint Dancing to American culture is being popularized by a grassroots movement created in 2006 by Seattle artist and activist Matt Jones. The phrases "paint dancing" and "paint dancer" and other variations were originally coined in 1996 by Gloria M. Buono, author, illustrator and publisher of The Painting Ballerina.
