= Mako (dance) =

The Mako is a fast-paced dance from Tonga which is performed by young men. Accompanied by an extremely fast rhythm on a drum or tin can, dancers perform wild gestures involving their entire bodies; they point in various directions, run, sit, roll, or lie down repeatedly and in quick succession. The dance originated in ʻUvea and is only rarely performed in Tonga.

== Musical themes ==
The songs used with the Mako feature lyrics in Tongan. Their themes are most often drawn from nature and daily life or occasionally from the Bible. Additionally, one of the best-known refrains, toli he siale, is a double entendre; it can mean "picking flowers".
