= Hiplet (dance style) =

Dance style fusing ballet with hip hop

'Hiplet - When Ballet Meets Hip-Hop' - video report from Voice of America.

Hiplet (/hɪpˈleɪ/ hip-LAY) is a newly recognized dance style that fuses ballet with hip hop. The term was first coined in 2009, but in May 2016, dancers from the Chicago Multi-Cultural Dance Center (CMDC) performing hiplet gained widespread popularity after a video of the dancers attained thousands of views on Instagram. ABC News subsequently invited the dancers to perform on a televised broadcast. The creation of this genre is attributed to Homer Hans Bryant of the CMDC. The CMDC is currently the only studio in the world that trains dancers in hiplet.

== Style ==
Hiplet is notable for its combination of ballet-style movement, which is ethnographically Eurocentric and primarily white, and hip-hop, which is rooted in and grown out of African dance and rich urban culture from communities of color. With its strong roots in traditional movement, dancers train to advance to pointe through years of practice. Ballet is at the core of hiplet, and strong technical skills are imperative to being able to safely practice hiplet. The dancers usually wear traditional ballet attire, including buns, leotards, and tights. Notably, many wear tights and pointe shoes dyed to match their skin color. The dance resembles traditional ballet mixed with sharper angles and less restricted movements.

Hiplet's origins can be traced to Homer Hans Bryant's 1992 "Rap Ballet," but precedents for similar dance fusions extend back much further than the 1990s.

“Breaking, Ballet, and the Representation of Race and Gender,” from Hip Hop on Film, provides background on multiple dance styles in both a cultural and performance context. This piece provides earlier examples of artists attempting new types of movement by contending with racialized and gendered histories of different dance styles, stretching back to the mid-twentieth century, setting a precedent for hiplet to form.

== Social impact ==
This fusion also has a strong history in the dance world, and draws upon many prior endeavors to combine different styles. Homer is helping black dancers express a more contemporary and culturally reflective art form that expresses who they are and where they come from. This provides young, predominantly black, dancers of color the chance to train in an art that still largely excludes them.

== Media dispersion ==
Hiplet is an example of performance as media consumption, with its path from Instagram, to television, and most recently, to TEDx. The dancers were invited to perform on Good Morning America following internet notoriety.

Analyzing the media that gave notoriety to hiplet reveals tensions in dance between performance and archive, and how dance resists being documented due to its temporal nature. Digital media and recordings present a revolutionary way to preserve dance history, and engage in participatory media culture. Pitfalls of widespread access to dance materials are expressed; viewing a live performance and viewing a recording are very different experiences. Dance’s digital archive interacts with the cultural context of its origins and viewing, providing room for new interpretations of work. Digitization is a means of creation, split between recalling an original and existing independently.

Archiving is one of the five identified primary uses of Instagram, where hiplet first gained notoriety. It also functions under several other Instagram categories, including self-expression, social interaction, and escapism.
