= Mexcaltitán Ballet =

The Mexcaltitán Ballet (native name Ballet Mexcaltitan, Danza y Arte de México) was founded in 1989 by choreographer Sergio Eugenio García Pérez and is based in the western state of Nayarit in Mexico. It was founded to promote and consolidate Mexican folk dance, with a focus on the state of Nayarit, making it unique. However, the troupe also performs other dances from Latin America and contemporary dance as well as Mexican styles. The dancers are young and trained by the company to perform. The organization is divided into two sections, the main group and a children’s group called the Mexcaltitán Infantil, geared to very young dancers with the aim of training them to become part of the main group. Today, the troupe is supported by the Nayarit state government and García Pérez remains as the general director.

While its main objective is to train young dancers in traditional Mexican folk dance, it also trains artists in other disciplines such as acting and singing, with the aim of further promoting Mexican and Nayarit culture. This allows the organization to create larger theatrical pieces such as a homage to Francisco Gabilondo Soler, who performed radio shows for children in the 20th century. In 2011, the group presented a program called Legends and Traditions of Old Nayarit in honor of choreographer Jaime Buentello Bazán. This production focused on the stories, dance and music of the state in times past, especially those areas along the coast.

The ensemble has performed in its native Nayarit and other parts of Mexico such as Guadalajara, Cancún, and the Palacio de Bellas Artes in Mexico City. The ensemble has toured in Europe, Asia and the Americas in countries such as France, Spain, Belgium, Germany, Switzerland, England, Taiwan, Dominican Republic, Argentina, Chile, Peru, Honduras, Guatemala, El Salvador, Cuba, Brazil, India, Canada, and the United States. Festivals in which it has performed include Festival Internacional Cervantino, Encuentro Internacional de Folklore "Antumapu" at the University of Chile in Santiago in 2011, and the Miami Book Fair International in Florida. The group states that the dances of Jalisco receive the most attention abroad and most readily identify the group as Mexican.
