= Dance in ancient Egypt =

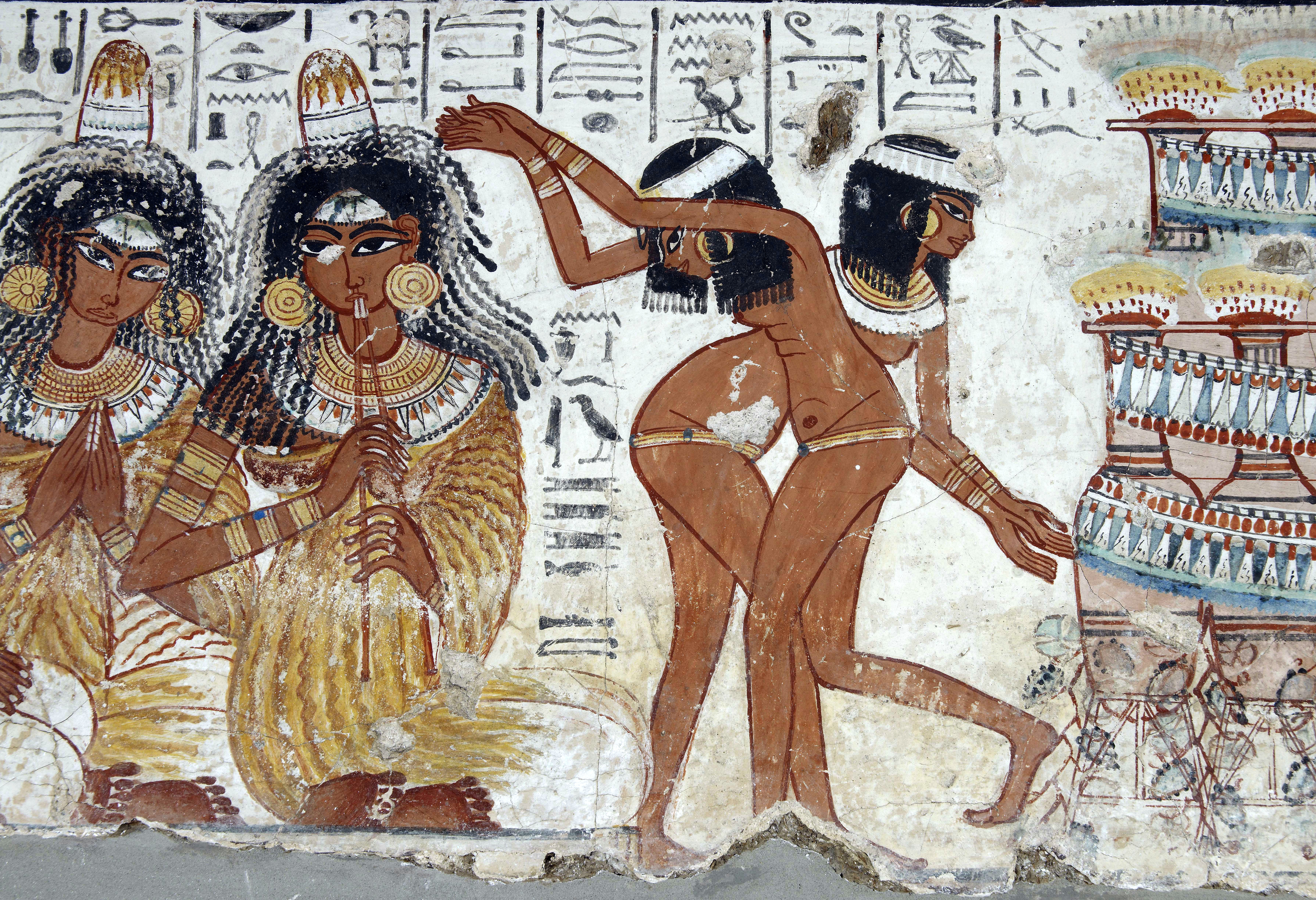
Naked female dancers in a painting from the Tomb of Nebamun, c. 1350 BC, New Kingdom

Dancing played an important role in the lives of the ancient Egyptians. However, men and women are never depicted dancing together. The trf was a dance performed by a pair of men during the Old Kingdom. Dance groups were accessible to perform at dinner parties, banquets, lodging houses, and even religious temples. Some women from wealthy harems were trained in music and dance. They danced for royalty accompanied by male musicians playing on guitars, lyres, and harps. Yet, no well-bred Egyptian would dance in public, because that was the privilege of the lower classes. Wealthy Egyptians kept slaves to entertain at their banquets and present pleasant diversion to their owners.

== History ==
The oldest known depictions of dance in this region are found in Predynastic era rock carvings, a linen shroud, a wall painting, a clay model, and pottery in Upper Egypt. The earliest examples of Predynastic dancers come from pottery of the Badarian culture from the 5th millennium BC and Naqada I and Naqada II cultures from the 4th millennium BC. The importance of dance appeared to lessen over time as dancing scenes became rare in the late Naqada period.

The first illustrations of dance in ancient Egypt come from scenes in Old Kingdom tombs of performers associated with funerals.

Researcher Irena Lexová authored the first monograph entirely on ancient Egyptian dance.

== Dancers ==
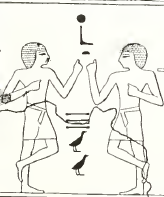
Tomb of Paheri, Plate V from Petrie's Anhas el Medineh / Herkleopolis Magna

Professional groups of singers (ḥsı͗t), musicians (ḥnı͗t or ḥnwt), and dancers (ḥbw) often performed at important festivals and funerary services. These groups were referred to in the Old and Middle Kingdoms as the ḫnr or khener, which in context translates to "musical performers". Khener can also be used to describe a troupe of singers and dancers arranged through a bureau. Victorian scholars often confused the term khener with a harem due to poor understanding of the depictions and cultural differences. The khener are depicted as entertainers for religious ceremonies, entertaining the deceased kings, but the khener may not be solely religious. Khener were used at the Temples of Hathor, Bat, Wepwawet, and Horus Iunmutef. Some kheners were itinerant, traveling from their permanent seat to offer their services as indicated in the story of Ruddedet. Dancers also took on work outside performances in order to support themselves.

The main types of ḫnr thought to have existed are those associated with cults and temples, the king and funerary estates. The ḫnr appear to have been dominated and headed by females until the latter days of the Old Kingdom.

Foreign dancers and musicians became more represented in the New Kingdom. Scholars recognize these dancers' origins by costume, hairstyle, and names in texts among other attributes. They apparently could join an ḫnr, but their participation may have been limited. Scenes in temple reliefs indicate that some cult performances were only reserved for elite Egyptian women.

== Costumes and headdress of ancient Egyptian dancers ==
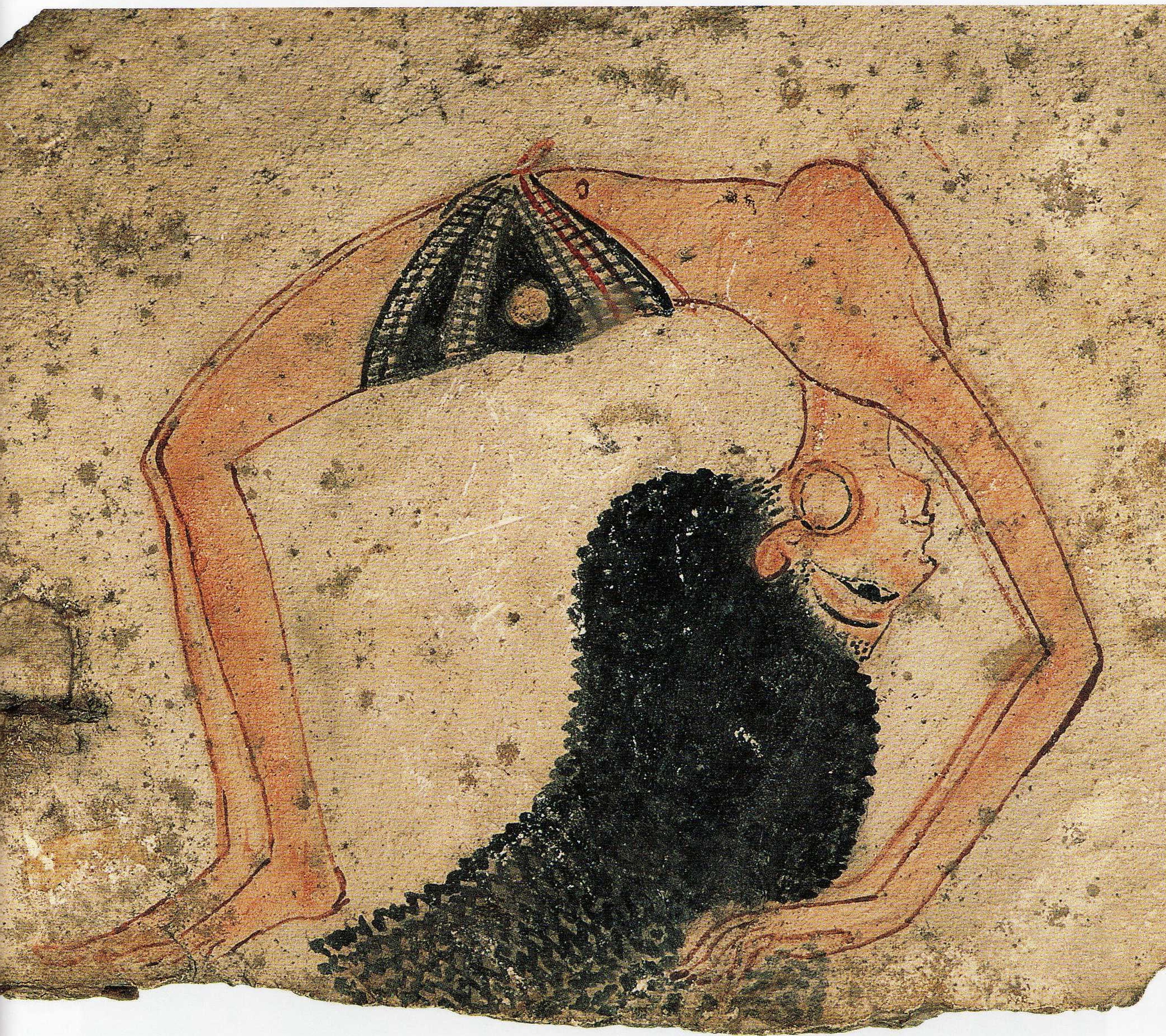
Topless dancer in a back bend, ostrakon, 13th century BC, New Kingdom

Female dancers rarely wore the restrictive ordinary dress – a strapped white sheath starting at the bust and running down to the ankles. An exception in the Old Kingdom was for funeral dances. Old Kingdom dancers are not only depicted in dresses but in men's aprons with a scarf or men's skirts.

Middle and New Kingdom dancers never wore men's skirts, but did wear men's aprons without the scarf. By the New Kingdom, adult dancers appear more scantily clad, often wearing only a belt or scarf about their hips, sometimes with a transparent robe to allow observation of their bodies. New Kingdom dancers also wore variations of ordinary dress in their transparent broad long cloaks. Dresses often left the right breast exposed.

Dancers adorned themselves with bracelets and ribbons or garlands on their heads. Old Kingdom dancers would wear ribbons around their chests. New Kingdom dancers would wear floral collars, earrings and cones made of fragranced semi-solid fat or beeswax, used to give out a pleasant perfume as the dancers performed. Dancers' eyes were thickly outlined with kohl.

In the Old and Middle Kingdoms, women's hair dress was characteristically "evenly cut and smoothly combed down, divided into two thinner plaits hanging from the shoulders down to the chest and one broad plait covering the upper part of the back." Female dancers who did not have long hair resorted to wearing wigs styled in the same fashion.

Female dancers are also depicted with a tattooed or painted symbol on their thigh of Bes, a god of fertility and childbirth affiliated with music and dance. It is unclear whether this decoration was unique to dancers or if women commonly had it applied.

Male dancers had short hair and typically wore the standard men's dress viz. skirt; in the Old and Middle Kingdoms, they would also wear an apron with round edges in the front.

Among the ornaments male dancers would wear were collars or chains around their necks, whereas the younger boys wore bracelets on their feet.

Lexová also added that dancers of that era used a short curved stick or cane while dancing, which is a prop still used by modern Egyptian dancers.

== Musical instruments ==
Before the New Kingdom, dancers were mostly accompanied by clapping or percussion instruments. Afterward, performers could dance to a greater range of music with the introduction of stringed instruments like the lute and the lyre.

The ancient Egyptians used a vast array of musical instruments such as sistrums, harps, drums, flutes, cymbals, clappers, and tambourines that played a prominent role in melodic compositions of ancient Egyptians composers and musicians. It was rare to find wind or stringed instrument players close to dancers in the same scene. However, it was noted that whenever musicians are depicted, dancers were not generally far away.

== Types of dancing ==
Lexová set out classifications for the various dances of the period: the purely movemental dance, the gymnastic dance, the imitative dance, the pair dance, the group dance, the war dance, the dramatic dance, the lyrical dance, the grotesque dance, the funeral dance and the religious dance.

Dance scholar and performer Elizabeth "Artemis" Mourat also categorized dances into six types: religious dances, non-religious dances, banquet dances, harem dances, combat dances and street dances.

=== Solo, pair and group dances ===
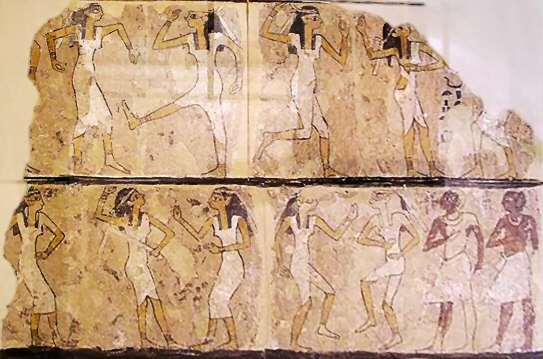
Tomb of the Dancers, wall painting, 17th Dynasty, Thebes, Second Intermediate Period

Ancient Egyptian dancers danced either as soloists, in pairs or in groups, depending on the occasion and type of the dance performed. Individual or solo dances included performances by the king or priests designated as his representatives. The king would perform the sun dance and he or his deputy danced at the harvest festival honoring Min of Koptos, a fertility god.

==== Pair dancing ====
In pair dancing, two people of the same gender would perform together. This form of dancing was established by the 6th Dynasty. An image from this time depicted female pair dancers with canes. 5th Dynasty female dancers are shown to hold hands while performing in unison. The dances used symmetrical and dramatic movements and conveyed emotions such as longing or depression.

==== Group dances ====
There were two types of Egyptian group dances. One was performed in individual movements that confirmed a theme or idea or was carried out spontaneously as in prehistoric times. Dancers competed with one another, often in groups, substituting movement that were later established in funeral dances rites.(Lexová 1935) A second type featured pairs or ranks of dancers who executed repetitive movements in a circle. Banquets and festivals often included performances by trained pair dancers.

=== Funeral dances ===
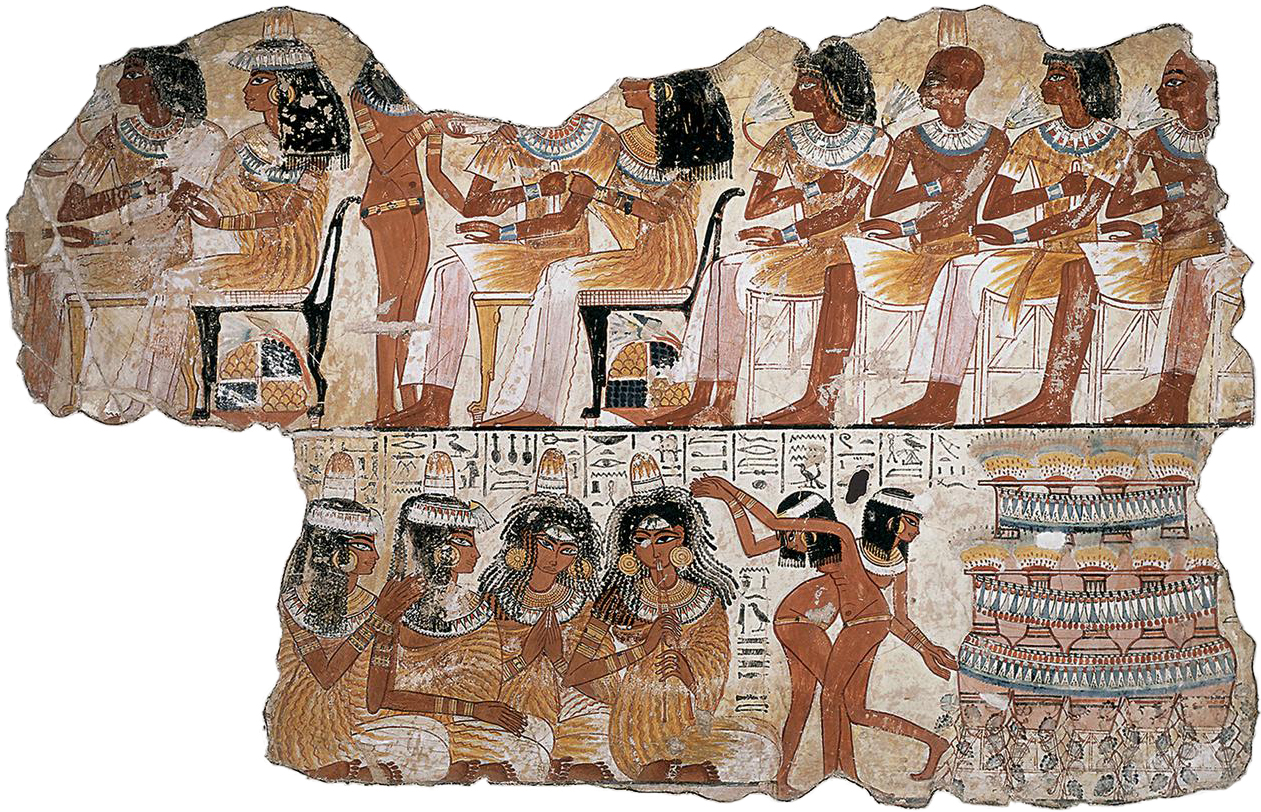
A fragment of the frescoes on the wall of the tomb chapel of Nebamun, depicting guests, servants, musicians, and dancers at a funerary banquet

Dances associated with funerals included ritual, postures and gestures and secular dances.

Old Kingdom performers included a specialized group of female dancers called "the acacia house". Dances by the acacia house followed mummification and were aimed at appeasing the goddess Sekhmet and rejuvenating and mourning the dead. Khener dancers are often portrayed entertaining the rejuvenated deceased while he eats from the offering table.

The women in banquet scenes playing music and dancing for the deceased and his family, especially in New Kingdom tombs, were not all professional and sometimes included close family relations. The scenes reflected what was hoped to be replayed in the afterlife.

During the Middle and New Kingdom periods, a separate funeral dance was practiced dedicated to Hathor in the goddess's role as guide for the dead into the afterlife. It involved leaping or skipping and was accompanied by a sung or spoken prayer to the sounds of percussion, including the clapping of hands and sticks.

Another specialized troupe of sacred dancers, mww or muu dancers, existed across the Kingdoms. They performed at various points in the funeral, wearing kilts and crowns of woven reed or palm fiber that signified their role as ferrymen. The crowns themselves were cone-shaped and resembled the king's White Crown of Upper Egypt. Through their dance, they symbolically delivered the deceased to the netherworld. One researcher finds that the "dances... made by the sacred dancers at the door of... [the] tomb" in the Story of Sinuhe is named the "Dance of the Weary-ones". The title referred to the deceased's ancestors.

==== Dwarfs and pygmies ====
Dwarfs and pygmies were known from the Old Kingdom and were prized for their rarity and as dancers were hired for special occasions. The dances they performed were farewell performances associated with the departure of the sun. The dwarfs were used as they were thought to represent the sun due to their stunted growth. There are indications that dancing dwarfs replaced mww dancers at the tomb entrance by the Twentieth Dynasty. Lexová notes an image of the dancers of the dwarf dances wearing similar crowns.

After the New Kingdom changes of tomb decoration took place funerary dances were no longer depicted on tomb walls but were found in temples instead. The dancing scenes portrayed in temples reflected both royal and divine ceremonies. All dancing scenes had one common feature that being the solemn procession of the sacred barks carrying a god.

=== Festive dances ===
Among the festivals during which dancing took place the following are enumerated:

- Sed festival dances took place during jubilee ceremonies which celebrated the renewal pledge to the king. Such dances varied in accordance to the religious significance and the reflection of the local mythology of the God to whom they were directed.
- Valley festival at Thebes celebrates the God Amun's trip from Karnak temple to visit the tombs on the West Bank passing by the sanctuary of Hathor. As the procession moved from one place to another, families rejoiced and danced.
- Opet Festival: another event associated with God Amun's visit to his wife Goddess Mut from Karnak Temple to Luxor temple. This procession was marked by groups of women doing acrobatic dances together with dark dancers, probably Nubians who jumped and merged with the drums.
- Feast of Min: god of fertility and regeneration: The dancers in this feast were members of his cult. Drawings representing this feast showed priests and monkeys dancing. These drawings could have had a symbolic meaning rather than an actual representation of reality.
- Nile Flood Feast: (The New Year celebration): Dancing played a vital role in this festivity as it helped transform the dangerous Sekhmet into the mild Hathor, thereby protecting the ancient land from Sekhmet's evil and deadly demons. These dances included all possible forms of movement including acrobats and exotic foreign dances.
