= Classical Persian dance =

Classical Persian dance is a style of concert dance which evolved from courtroom dance. The Qajar dynasty, which reigned from 1795 to 1925, had an important influence on Persian dance. In this period, a style of dance began to be called "classical Persian dance". Dancers performed artistic dances in the court of the Shah for entertainment purposes such as coronations, marriage celebrations, and Norouz celebrations (Iranian new year). The rise of the Qadjars liberalizes people's attitudes toward dancing, although it remained in the royal court and among the elite and bourgeois families. The court dancers elevated respect for dance to an art form.

Costuming generally consisted of loosely fitted long dress with long sleeves, worn with a jacket. The jacket extended over the sides of the hips and was either worn open or closed. The Qadjar dancers wore pants under the dress. Persian pant was cut narrow, loose the bottom and was cuffed. Sometimes a Turkish harem pant was worn, extremely full and gathered tight at the ankles. The fabrics had flower patterns and were bright in color. The Shah rewarded performers with jewels, so many costumes had elaborate gold embroidery, pearl beading and gemstones. Upon the head was worn a plume, or aigret, a small egret shaped ornament, or a small paisley-shaped hat adorned with jewels, pearls and a feather. Hair was worn long and elaborate, with side locks and bangs fashioned into shapes.

Traditionally, the music was played by a small band with one or two melodic instruments and a drum. In the 20th century, the music came to be orchestrated and dance movement and costuming gained a modernistic orientation to the West. In 1928, ballet came to Iran and impacted dance performance, adding a feeling of lightness and more delicate footwork. The jacket was flared more fully at the hips much like a tutu, and the dance form became more modern in outlook and flourished as a performing art.
