= German Dance Platform =

The German Dance Platform (German language: Tanz Plattform Deutschland), is a biennial contemporary dance festival held in different locations. The festival strives to bring together cultural event organizers, trade press and mainstream audiences from Germany and abroad.

The first edition took place in Berlin, in 1994. The festival was created through the cooperation between various institutions working to support contemporary dance in Germany. Other locations have included Frankfurt am Main (1996), Leipzig (2002), Düsseldorf (2004), Stuttgart (2006), and Dresden (2012).
