= Non-dance =

Non-dance (or nondance) is a choreographic movement within contemporary dance. It began in the 1990, principally in France. Its practitioners see it as a transdisciplinary movement, dispensing with the movement vocabulary of traditional dance to integrate or substitute that of other performing arts (theater, video, music, and plastic arts).

== History ==
Most of the choreographers who developed non-dance came from the milieu of nouvelle danse française (also known as jeune danse française: "new" or "young" French dance) in which they participated as performers in the 1980s. They became choreographers in the 1990s, their work focusing increasingly on creating pieces where dance and dance movement disappear in favor of many other activities or theatrical techniques, including legitimate theater, lectures, plastic arts, music, and often video, film, or projections. The resulting performances are akin to performance art; in some cases, dancers as such are not even necessary to the execution of the work: the choreographer-author speaking through other media and sometimes in places not originally intended for dance performances, such as museums.

The precursor to this movement is Orazio Massaro (a dancer in the company of Dominique Bagouet from 1987 to 1990), who created the piece Volare for the Montpellier Dance Festival in 1990. In that piece, for the first time in the history of French contemporary dance, six dancers were deprived of choreography and become actors, in a critical look at dance through their autobiographical stories.

Major choreographers associated with non-dance include Boris Charmatz, Jérôme Bel, Hervé Robbe, Xavier Le Roy, Alain Buffard, Benoît Lachambre, Josef Nadj, Maguy Marin (in her recent pieces), Carlotta Sagna, Vahram Zaryan (in his recent mime and dance performances) and Wayn Traub.

== Bibliography ==
- Frétard, Dominique (2004). La Danse contemporaine:danse et non danse. Paris: Cercle d'art. ISBN 2-7022-0747-2
