= Espringale =

Medieval dance

Espringale is Old French for a medieval jumping-dance. It is distinct from the Old French carol, a round dance. It may correlate to the frequently mentioned Hupfauff, Springdantz, and saltarello types of dances of the late Middle Ages.

The term is found in the c.1227 Roman de la violette by Montreuil and the 1389 Songe du viell pèlerin by Mézières.
