= French ballet =

Dancing tradition

Ballet first began to flourish in the French courts during the 17th century with the help of several important men: King Louis XIV, Jean-Baptiste Lully, Pierre Beauchamps, and Molière. The combination of different talents and passions of these four men shaped ballet to what it is today.

== Louis XIV ==
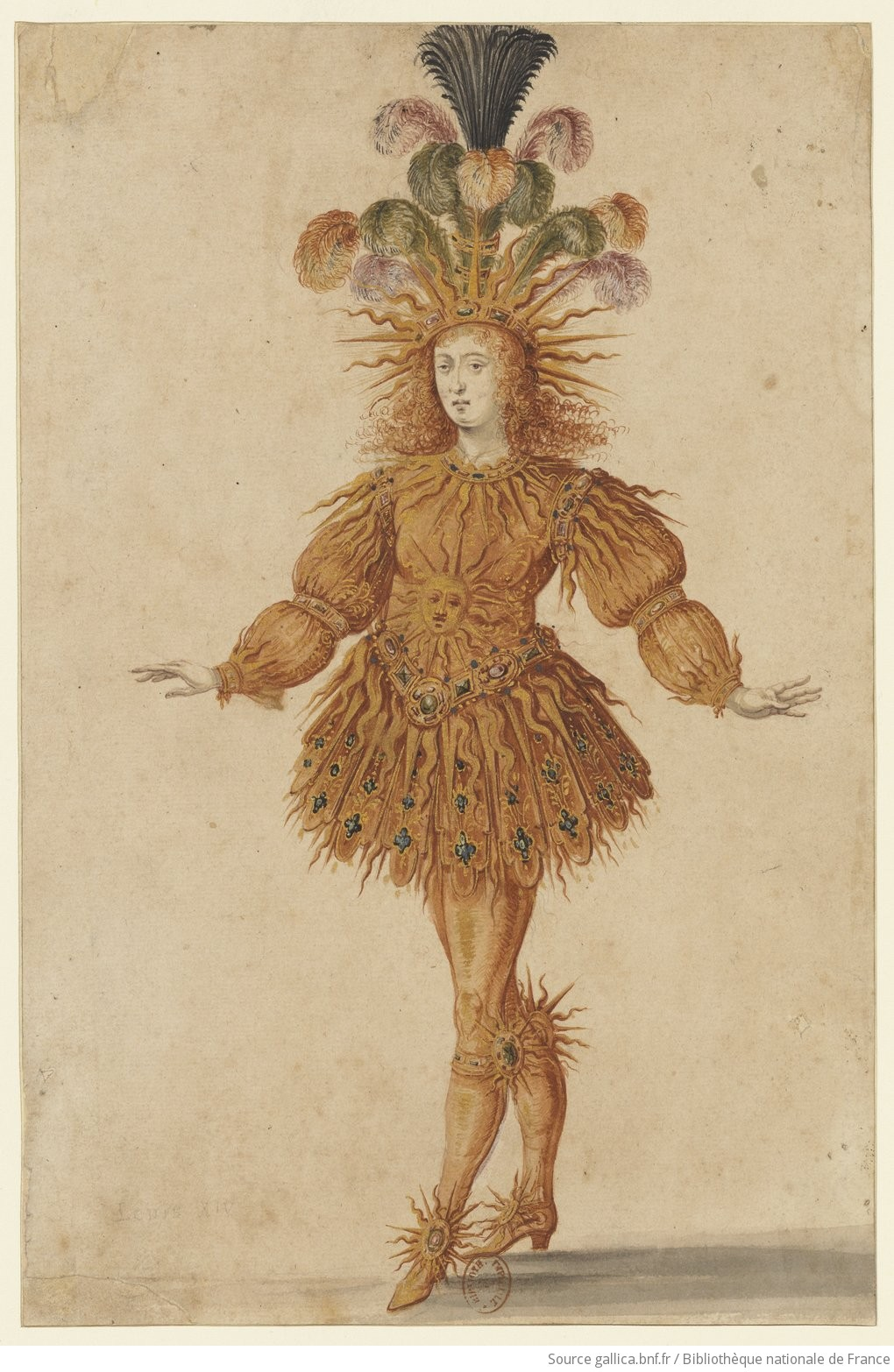
Louis XIV as Apollo in the Ballet Royal de la Nuit (1653)

Louis XIV, the King of France from 1643 to 1715, was a ballet enthusiast from a young age. In fact his birth was celebrated with the Ballet de la Felicite in 1639. As a young boy, he was strongly supported and encouraged by the court, particularly by Italian-born Cardinal Mazarin, to take part in the ballets. He made his debut at age 12 in the Ballet de Cassandre in 1651. Two years later in 1653, the teenage king starred as Apollo, the sun god, in Ballet Royal de la Nuit (Royal Ballet of the Night). His influence on the art form and its influence on him became apparent. His fancy golden costume was not soon forgotten, and his famous performance led to his nickname, the Sun King. In the ballet, he banishes the night terrors as he rise as sun at dawn. His courtiers were forced to worship him like a god through choreography. They were made clear of the glory of King Louis XIV and that he had absolute authority both on and off the dance floor. The ballets that young King Louis performed in were very different from ballets performed today. The form of entertainment was actually called ballets d'entrées. This refers to the small divisions, or "entries," that the ballets were broken up into. For example, Le Ballet de la Nuit, comprised over forty of such entries, which were divided into four vigils or parts, with a total run time of 13 hours.

Throughout his reign, Louis XIV worked with many influential people in his court dances, such as poet Isaac de Benserade, as well as designers Torelli, Vigarani and Henry de Gissey, which made fashion and dance closely interlinked. Possibly his greatest contribution to the French court was bringing composer/dancer Jean-Baptiste Lully. Louis supported and encouraged performances in his court as well as the development of ballet throughout France. Louis XIV was trained by Pierre Beauchamp. The King demonstrated his belief in strong technique when he founded the Académie Royale de Danse in 1661 and made Beauchamp leading ballet master. King Louis XIV's and France's attempt to keep French ballet standards high was only encouraged further when in 1672 a dance school was attached to the Académie Royale de Musique. Led by Jean-Baptiste Lully, this ballet company is known today as the Paris Opera Ballet.

The king made it a daily practice to have a ballet lesson after his morning riding lesson. As the French people watched and took note of what their leader was doing, dancing became an essential accomplishment for every gentleman. Ballet became a way of life for those who were around King Louis XIV. The culture of seventeenth-century France, is a reflection of an organized ballet that was choreographed, costumed appropriately, and performed with precision. Louis XIV retired from ballet in 1670.

== Jean-Baptiste Lully ==
Perhaps one of the most influential men on ballet during the seventeenth century was Jean Baptiste Lully. Lully was born in Italy, but moved to France where he quickly became a favorite of Louis XIV and performed alongside the king in many ballets until the king's retirement from dance in 1670. He moved from dancer for the court ballets to a composer of such music used in the courts. By the time he was thirty, Lully was completely in charge of all the musical activities in the French courts. Lully was responsible for enlivening the rather slow stately dances of the court ballets. He decided to put female dancers on stage and was also director of the Académie Royale de Musique. This company's dance school still exists today as part of the Paris Opera Ballet. Since dancers appeared in the first performances the Opera put on, the Paris Opera Ballet is considered the world's oldest ballet company. When Lully died in 1687 from a gangrenous abscess on the foot which developed after he stuck himself with the long staff he used for conducting, France lost one of the most influential conductors and composers of the seventeenth century. However, Lully did not work alone. In fact, he often worked in collaboration with two other men that were equally influential to ballet and the French culture: Pierre Beauchamps and Molière.

== Pierre Beauchamps ==
Beauchamps was a ballet master who was deeply involved with the creation of court ballets in the 1650s and 1660s. However, Beauchamps began his career as the personal teacher to Louis XIV. He is also credited with coming up with the five fundamental foot positions from which all balletic movements move through. Beauchamps techniques were taught throughout France in secondary schools as well as by private teachers. Contemporary dancers would astonish Beauchamps at their ability to have 180-degree turnout. Beauchamps dancers wore high-heeled shoes and bulky costumes which made turnout difficult and slight.

One of the first things that Lully and Beauchamps worked together on was Les Fêtes de l'Amour et de Bacchus, which they called opéra-ballet. The opéra-ballet is a form of lyric theatre in which singing and dancing were presented as equal partners in lavish and spectacular stagings. The Les Fêtes de l'Amour et de Bacchus, one of their first and most famous collaborations, consisted of excerpts from court ballets linked by new entrées stages by Beauchamps. Customarily, King Louis and courtiers danced in the court ballets; however, in this new form of entertainment, the opéra-ballet, all of the dancers were professionals. Beauchamps not only collaborated with Lully, but he also had the great privilege to partner with Molière during his lifetime.

Beauchamps also originated the Beauchamp–Feuillet notation, which provided detailed indications of the tract of a dance and the related footwork. Starting in 1700, hundreds of social and theatrical dances were recorded and widely published in this form. Although this has been superseded in modern times by even more expressive notations, the notation is sufficiently detailed that, along with contemporary dancing manuals, these dances can be reconstructed today

== Molière ==
Molière was a well-known comedic playwright during that time period. He and Beauchamps collaborated for the first time in 1661, which resulted in the invention of comédie-ballet. His invention of comedies-ballets was said to be an accident. He was invited to set both a play and court ballet in honor of Louis XIV, but was short of dancers and decided to combined the two productions together. This resulted in Les Facheux in 1661. This and the following comédie-ballets were considered the most important advance in baroque dance since the development of Renaissance geometric figures. One of the most famous of these types of performances was Le Bourgeois gentilhomme, which is still performed today and continues to entertain audiences. The idea behind a comédie-ballet was a combination of spoken scenes separated by balletic interludes; it is the roots for today's musical theatre. Many of Molière's ballets were performed by Louis XIV. According to Susan Au, the king's farewell performance was Molière's Les Amants magnifiques in 1670. Not only were these types of performances popular in the courts, but they helped transition from courtiers being the dancers to using actors and professional dancers, soon to be known as ballerinas. The comédie-ballets helped to bring understanding between the court and the commoners as the transition from court ballets to a more common place ballet occurred.

With Molière writing the dialogue and directing, Beauchamps choreographing the ballet interludes, and Lully composing the music and overseeing the coming together of all the dancers and actors, these three men worked together to create many pieces of art for King Louis XIV.
