= Ritournelle =

The ritournelle is a 17th-century dance in quick triple time. 'Ritournelle' is the French equivalent of the Italian musical term 'ritornello'
