= Bournonville method =

Ballet technique

The Bournonville method is a ballet technique and training system devised by the Danish ballet master August Bournonville.

== Overview ==
August Bournonville trained with his father Antoine Bournonville and other notable French ballet masters. He was heavily influenced by the early French school of ballet, which he preserved in his teaching and choreography, when the traditional French methods began to disappear from European ballet. What is considered today to be the "Bournonville style" is essentially the unfiltered 19th century technique of the French school of classical dance.

The technique features very basic use of arms, usually keeping them in preparatoire position. Perpetual use of simple diagonal epaulements. Vocabulary for men is essentially varied forms of beats. Pirouettes are taken with a low développé into seconde, then from seconde, for outside turns, and with a low développé into 4th for inside turns. Also common are the dramatic use of fifth position bras en bas (preparatory position) for beginning and ending movements. The style has many recognizable poses such as pointe derriere one arm in 5th, the other a la taille (at the waist), with a touch of epaulement.

== Characteristics ==
- The guiding principle of the Bournonville method is that the dancer should perform with a natural grace, dramatic impact and harmony between body and music
- Graceful epaulement, with the upper body usually twisting towards the working foot, to draw attention to and emphasise the movement.
- Lowered eye-line to give the impression of kindness, not raised with the expression of being proud.
- The eyes naturally follow the moving leg.
- Great attention is paid to the shape and placement of the arms. Arms are held in front of the body in all positions, so as to be anatomically correct.
- Feet are low in the cou de pied position, with the toe of the working foot behind the ankle of the standing leg.
- Pirouettes are performed with a low leg position, a result of the long skirts worn by ladies during his time.
- Bournonville method is noted for developing quick footwork, as required by Bournonville's choreography
- There should be no visible effort. Even the largest, most dramatic steps should be performed in an understated manner.
- There should be a visible contrast between the speed of the legs and the grace of the arms and torso. The legs are the rhythm, the arms are the melody

== Notable students ==
The following is a list of notable dancers who received their training in the Bournonville method:

- Erik Bruhn
- Nikolaj Hübbe
- Johan Kobborg
- Ulla Poulsen

== See also ==
- Royal Danish Ballet
