= Concert dance =

Type of dance

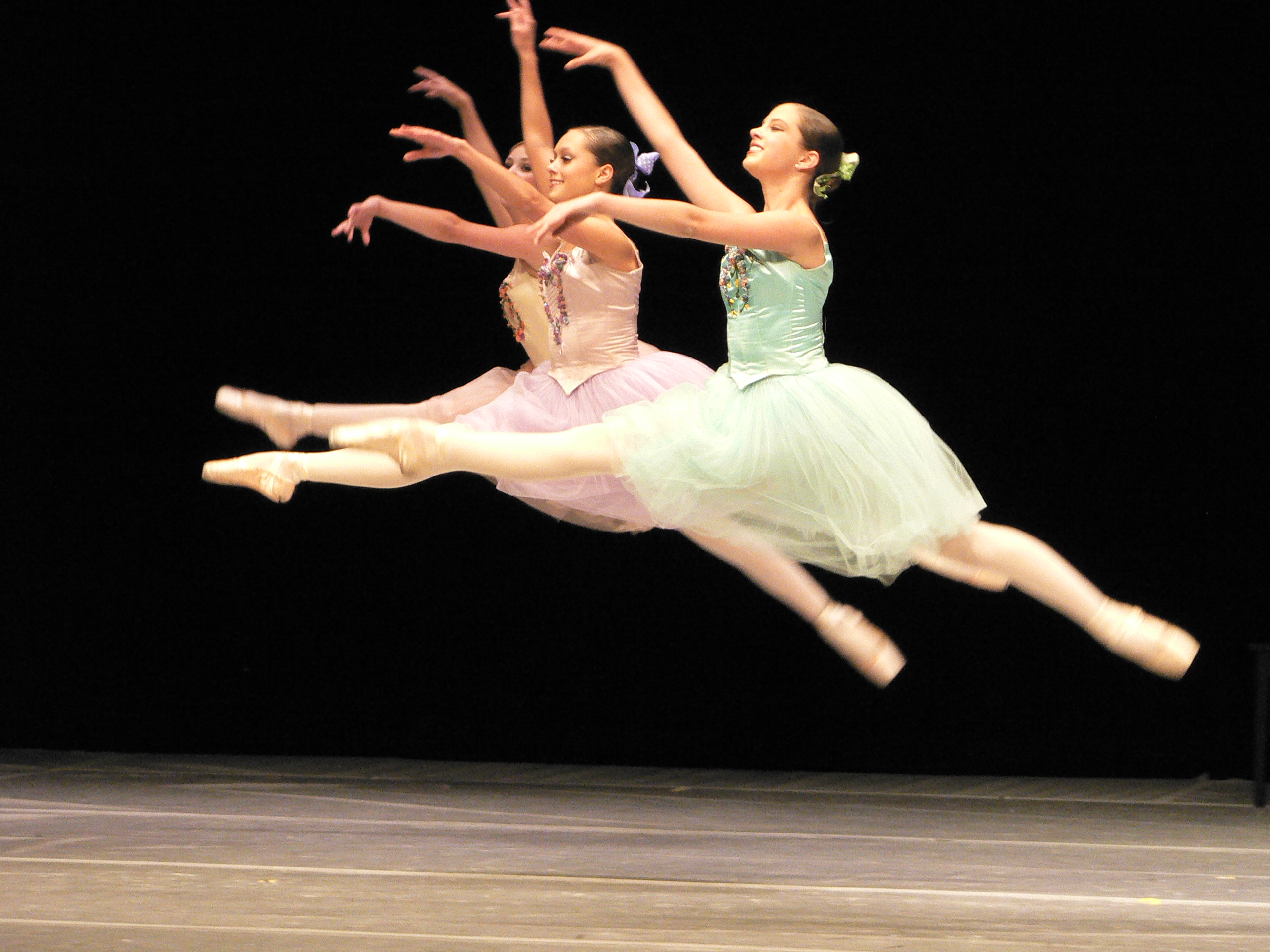
Ballet dancers executing grand jetés during a concert dance performance.

Concert dance (also known as performance dance, theatre dance, or dance theatre in the United Kingdom) is dance performed for an audience, often with theatrical elements such as rehearsed choreography, costumes, set-pieces, and potentially narrative elements. It is frequently performed in a theatre setting, though this is not a requirement, and it is usually choreographed and performed to set music.

By contrast, social dance and participation dance may be performed without an audience and, typically, these dance forms are neither choreographed nor danced to set music, though there are exceptions. For example, some ceremonial dances and baroque dances blend concert dance with participation dance by having participants assume the role of performer or audience at different moments.

== Forms ==
Many dance styles are principally performed in a concert dance context, including these:

- Ballet originated as courtroom dance in Italy, then flourished in France and Russia before spreading across Europe and abroad. Over time, it became an academic discipline taught in schools and institutions. Amateur and professional troupes formed, bringing ballet from the courts to the theater and making it one of the most widely performed concert dance styles today.
- Modern dance and contemporary dance emerged largely as 20th century offshoot of traditional ballet technique; although modern and contemporary dance have each evolved their own quality of movement, sharing only a portion of their common repertoire of techniques, both of the newer genres continue to be performed primarily in a concert/theatre hall setting.
- Acrobatic dance emerged in the United States and Canada in the early 1900s as one of the types of acts performed in vaudeville. Acro dance has evolved significantly since then, with dance movements now founded in ballet technique. From its inception, acro dance has been a concert dance form.
- Classical Indian dance originated in temples in India. After the Indian independence movement (1947 to 1950), dance became a university subject, dance schools appeared for the first time, and classical Indian dance became a concert dance form performed in theaters.
- Classical Persian dance was elevated to an art form during the Qajar dynasty (1795 to 1925). It was performed in the royal court of the Shah and it remained there and among the elite and bourgeois families until the 20th century. Since then, it has evolved into its modern-day form and become a widely performed concert dance style.

Others

- Belly dance
- Bharatanatyam
- Eurythmy
- Hip hop dance
- Japanese traditional dance
- Jazz dance
- Tap dance
- Wuju

== In the United Kingdom ==
In the United Kingdom, theatre dance is a common term used to indicate a range of performance dance disciplines. It is widely used in reference to the teaching of dance. The UK has a number of dance training and examination boards, with the majority having a separate branch dedicated to theatre dance, with codified syllabi in each technique. Many dance teachers and schools worldwide, prepare their pupils for dance examinations and qualifications with a UK-based organisation, with notable examples including the Royal Academy of Dance, the Imperial Society of Teachers of Dancing and the International Dance Teachers Association. All UK theatre dance organisations are consistent in offering classical ballet, tap and modern or jazz as their core theatre branch subjects. Many also offer 'theatre craft' or 'stage dance', which is devised to reflect the choreography seen in musical theatre.

== See also ==
- List of dance style categories
