= British ballet =

Performance dance known for precise techniques

British ballet is most recognised for two leading methods, those of the Royal Ballet School and the Royal Academy of Dance. The identifying characteristic of British ballet is the focus on clean, precise technique and purity of line that is free of exaggeration and mannerisms. The training of dancers in Britain is noted for its slow progression, with a great deal of attention paid to basic technique. British ballet methods operate on the principle that establishing correct technique and strength slowly makes it much easier for the student to adapt to more difficult vocabulary and techniques later on. The main difference between the two is that The Royal Ballet School trains professional dancers, the Royal Academy of Dance trains teachers.

== Technique ==
=== Cecchetti influence ===
The Cecchetti method was vital in the development of classical ballet in the United Kingdom and contributed heavily to modern day British teaching methods. Enrico Cecchetti and his wife opened a ballet school in London in 1918, and his pupils included some of the most influential names in British ballet, many also influencing ballet throughout the world.

Dame Marie Rambert was a former pupil and colleague of Cecchetti, and she also established a professional ballet school teaching his methods. This led to the formation of the Ballet Club, the UK's first ballet company, which survives today as the country's oldest established dance company, although it is now known as Rambert Dance Company and specialises in contemporary dance. The school also remains and is known as the Rambert School of Ballet and Contemporary Dance. Dame Ninette de Valois was a colleague of Cecchetti during her professional career with the Ballets Russes. She established The Royal Ballet in London, with many of the company's early dancers being pupils of Cecchetti. The Cecchetti method was also favoured by de Valois when she formed the Royal Ballet School. Phyllis Bedells, another Cecchetti pupil, would also play an important role in the teaching of ballet in Britain, as a founder member of the Royal Academy of Dance, which today is the world's largest classical ballet-teaching organisation.

The British writer and dance historian Cyril W. Beaumont was a close friend of Cecchetti and in 1922 he collaborated with Cecchetti to codify the technique into a printed syllabus, The Cecchetti Method of Classical Ballet, which has become the foremost reference for Cecchetti method teachers worldwide. Cecchetti also gave Beaumont permission to establish the Cecchetti Society to maintain the method and ensure that it would be passed on to future ballet teachers in its original form. Branches of the Cecchetti Society were subsequently established around the world, most notably in Australia, South Africa, Canada and the USA. The original Cecchetti Society still exists in Britain, although it was absorbed into the Imperial Society of Teachers of Dancing, which continues to maintain the Cecchetti method as a separate entity from its own Imperial Classical Ballet syllabus.

It is in the tradition of classical ballet that technique is passed on directly Enrico Cecchetti having been taught by Giovanni Lepri who was taught by Carlo Blasis and the line can be traced back to Beauchamp, the first ballet master at the court of Louis X1V. So too was the Cecchetti method been passed on directly by his former pupils like Laura Wilson.

=== Vaganova influence ===
Britain became one of the first Western countries to be influenced by the Vaganova method. The method was introduced to Britain by the renowned teacher Vera Volkova who became one of the first teachers at the Sadler's Wells Ballet School.

== Notable companies and schools ==
- Rambert School of Dance, based in St Margarets, Twickenham founded in 1920, the oldest ballet school in the UK
- Birmingham Royal Ballet, sister company of the Royal Ballet, based in Birmingham
- Elmhurst School for Dance, Birmingham-based ballet school with links to Birmingham Royal Ballet
- English National Ballet, leading rival of the Royal Ballet companies
- English National Ballet School, official associate school of the English National Ballet
- Northern Ballet, ballet company based in Leeds, specialising in theatrical dance productions
- Northern Ballet Academy, associate non-residential school of Northern Ballet
- The Royal Ballet, widely regarded amongst the leading classical ballet companies in the world
- Royal Ballet School, official school of The Royal Ballet and Birmingham Royal Ballet
- Scottish Ballet, the national ballet company of Scotland

== Some notable British dancers ==
- Dame Alicia Markova, Prima Ballerina Assoluta. Former dancer with Serge Diaghilev's Ballets Russes and former principal dancer with the Ballet Club, Vic-Wells Ballet and American Ballet Theatre. She was co-founder of various touring ballet companies and today's English National Ballet
- Dame Margot Fonteyn, Prima Ballerina Assoluta. Former dancer with The Royal Ballet who spent her entire career with the company, forming a famous partnership with Rudolph Nureyev. She was President of the Royal Academy of Dance from 1954 to 1991 and Chancellor of the University of Durham from 1981 to 1990
- Dame Darcey Bussell, CBE Former dancer with Sadler's Wells Royal Ballet, later becoming Prima Ballerina of The Royal Ballet. Currently serves on the board of Directors for Sydney Dance Company and as a Patron of the International Dance Teachers Association

== Some notable choreographers ==
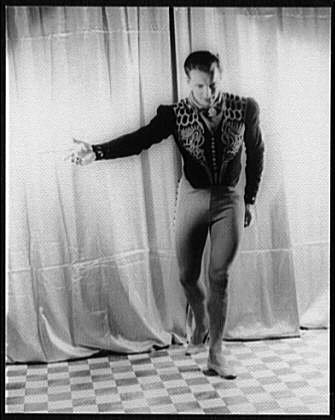
Antony Tudor

- Sir Frederick Ashton. Trained with Dame Marie Rambert and danced with the Ballet Club for whom he produced his earliest choreography. Was the first person to be appointed as resident choreographer of the Royal Ballet, and collaborated with de Valois to establish a distinctive British ballet repertory. Was later appointed Artistic Director of the company. Notable works: Les Rendezvous (1933), Sylvia (1952), Ondine (1958), La Fille Mal Gardée (1960) and A Month in the Country (1976).
- Sir Kenneth MacMillan. Trained at the Royal Ballet School and danced with Birmingham Royal Ballet before becoming a choreographer, producing his first works in the 1950s. Was ultimately appointed resident choreographer, then later artistic director at the Royal Ballet. Notable works: Romeo and Juliet (1965), Manon (1974) and Mayerling (1978),
- Dame Ninette de Valois. Former dancer with Serge Diaghilev's Ballets Russes. Established the Vic-Wells Ballet company and Sadler's Wells Ballet School, the forerunners of today's Royal Ballet, Birmingham Royal Ballet and Royal Ballet School. Regarded as one of the most influential figures in world ballet and as the 'Godmother' of British ballet. Notable works: Job (1931), The Rake's Progress (1935) and Checkmate (1937).
