= Bourrée =

French dance and music

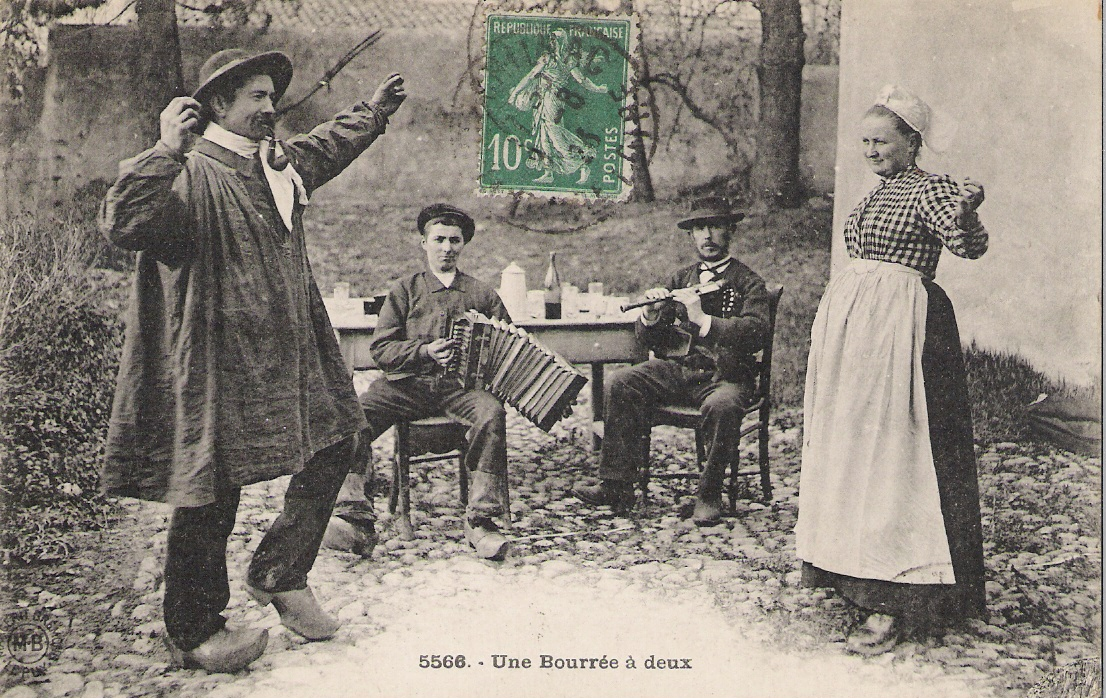
Borrèia in Auvergne, early 20th century

Lute Suite No. 1 – BWV 996, E Minor – V Bourrée
Performed on a lautenwerck by Martha Goldstein

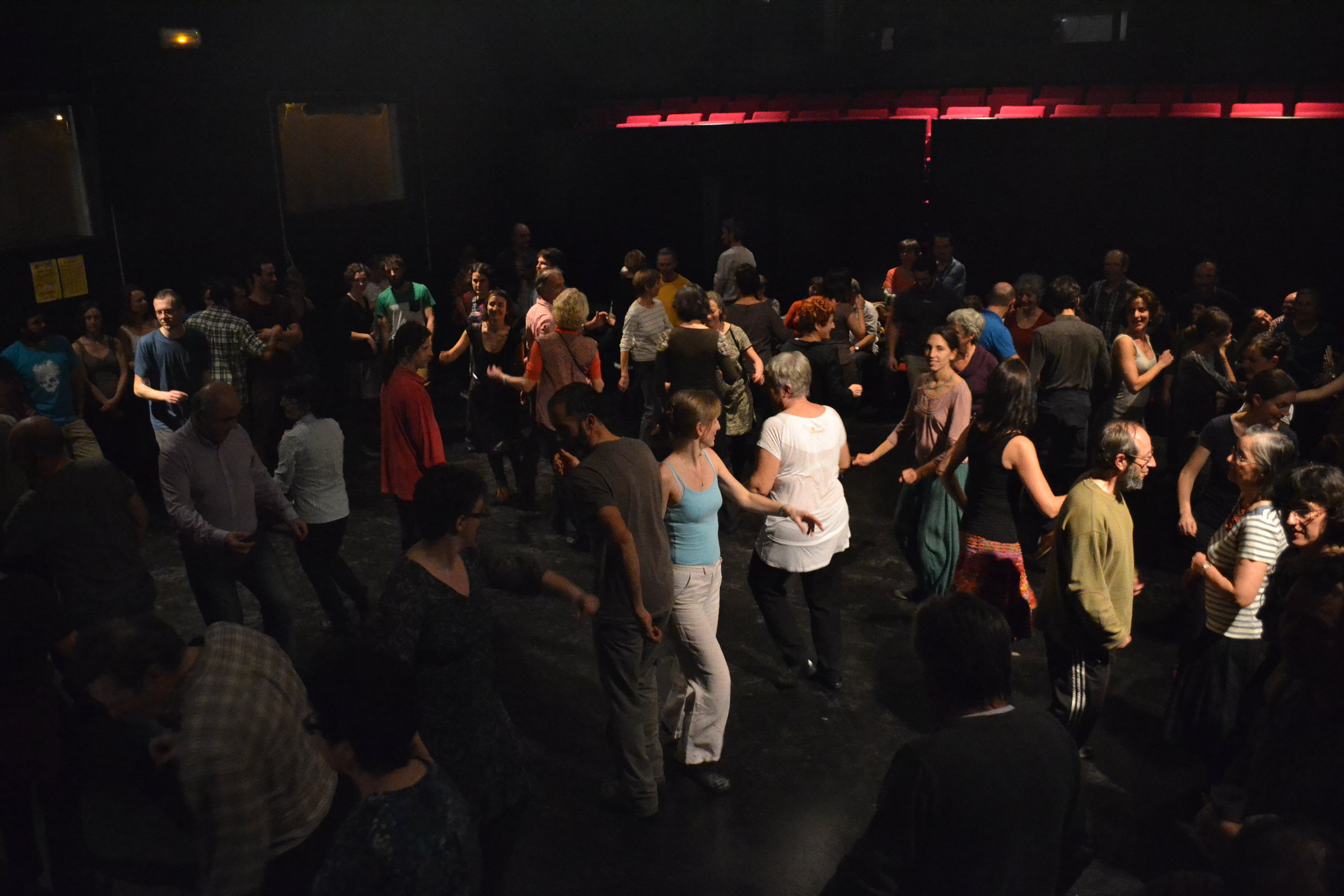
People dancing bourrée in a folk ball

The bourrée (/bʊˈreɪ/, French pronunciation: [buʁe]; Occitan: borrèia; also in England, borry or bore) is a dance of French origin and the words and music that accompany it. The bourrée resembles the gavotte in that it is in double time and often has a dactylic rhythm. However, it is somewhat quicker, and its phrase starts with a quarter-bar anacrusis or "pick-up", whereas a gavotte has a half-bar anacrusis.

In the Baroque era, after the Academie de Dance was established by Louis XIV in 1661, the French court adapted the bourrée, like many such dances, for the purposes of concert dance. In this way it gave its name to a ballet step characteristic of the dance, a rapid movement of the feet while en pointe or demi-pointe, and so to the sequence of steps called pas de bourrée.

The bourrée became an optional movement in the classical suite of dances, and J. S. Bach, Handel and Chopin wrote bourrées, not necessarily intending them to be danced.

== History ==
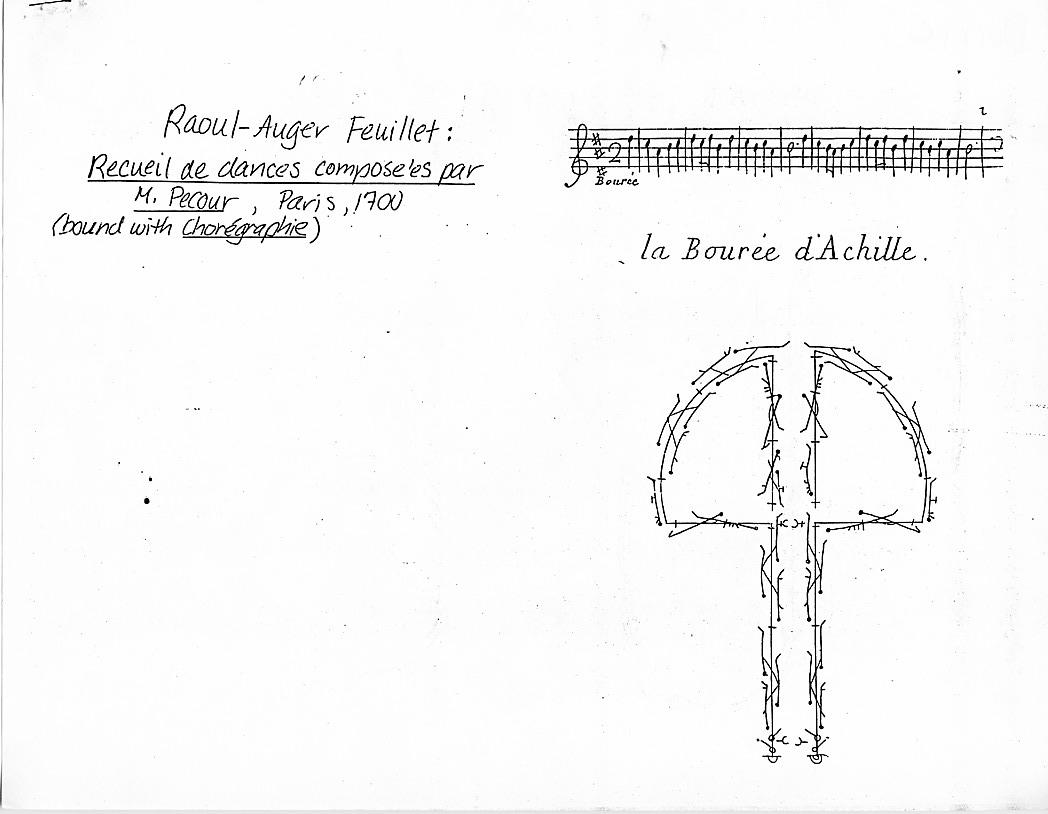
Eight bars of a dance recorded and published by Feuillet in 1700

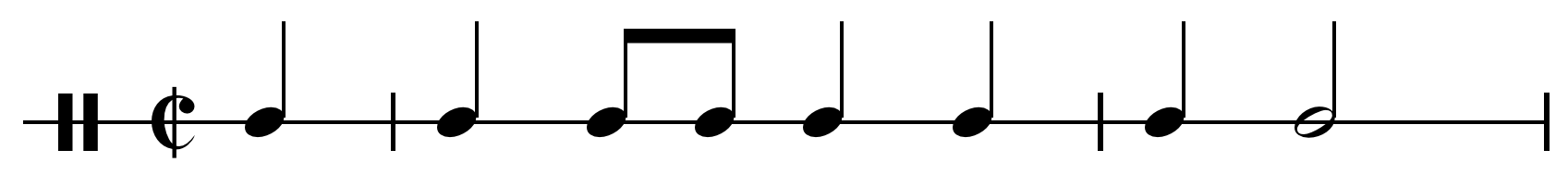
Bourrée rhythm

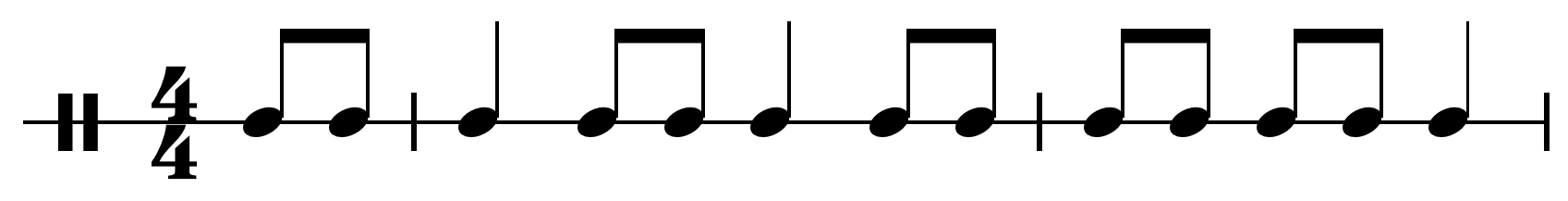
Another bourrée rhythm

The bourrée originates in Auvergne in France. It is sometimes called the "French clog dance" or a "branle of the sabots". First mentioned as a popular dance in 1665 in Clermont-Ferrand, it still survives in Auvergne in the Massif Central and in the department of Ariège and is danced during bals folk in France and in other countries. The present-day dance in lower Auvergne, also called Montagnarde (Montanhardas), is in triple time while that of high Auvergne called Auvergnate (Auvernhatas) is in double time. Modern variants termed bourrées are danced as partner dances, circle dances, square dances and line dances.

However bourrées have been composed as abstract musical pieces since the mid-16th century. Michael Praetorius mentions it in his Syntagma musicum and it is one of the dances arranged for his collection Terpsichore. However, there is no early dance notation and it is difficult to assess the early interaction of the folk dance and the courtly dance. Musically, the bourrée took on the common binary form of classical dance movements, sometimes extended by a second bourrée, the two to be played in a grand ternary form A–(A)–B–A.

Marguerite de Navarre, who was the wife of the King of Navarre and sister to the King of France, introduced the dance to the French court in 1565 and it was popular until the reign of Louis XIII (1601–1643) and opened many balls, but the bourrée took some time to appear in the early ballet dance notation of the French baroque theatre. The step with two movements is not illustrated by Feuillet but appears in Rameau as the "true" pas de bourrée, the simpler step, with one movement, is identified with the fleuret. The basic step, with one initial movement (i.e. a plié on the supporting leg) and three subsequent changes of weight in a measure, can be performed in a great many variations, and varieties of this step appear commonly throughout the notated dances that were published in the eighteenth century, starting with Feuillet in 1700.

The minuet step is a pas composé, a step composed of more basic steps. The pas de bourrée of one movement is the second half of the most common minuet step, the minuet step of two movements, or "one and a fleuret", as the English master Tomlinson described it. The rare pas de bourrée of two movements, mentioned above, occurs as a graceful variation in some recorded passepied, as part of a minuet step of three movements.

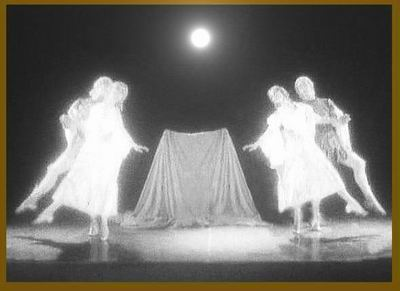
Yuri Khanon "L'Os de chagrin" ("The Shagreen Bone" opera-interlude) Final: Bourrée

As later formalised in classical ballet the skipping step of the bourrée became a quick, gliding step, often en pointe or demi-pointe, one of the most-used step sequences of ballet. A pas de bourrée, more commonly known as the "behind side front" or "back side front", is a quick sequence of movements often taken in preparation for a larger step. In one account it begins with an extension of the first leg while demi plié, closing it to the second as both transit to relevé, extending the second leg to an open position and again closing first to second in demi plié , or with legs straight if quick or as the final step of an enchainement. There are several variants. A pas de bourrée piqué picks up the feet in between steps.

In his Der Vollkommene Capellmeister (Hamburg, 1739), Johann Mattheson wrote of the bourrée, "its distinguishing feature resides in contentment and a pleasant demeanor, at the same time it is somewhat carefree and relaxed, a little indolent and easygoing, though not disagreeable".

Johann Sebastian Bach often used the bourrée in his suites as one of the optional dance movements that come after the sarabande but before the gigue, and he also wrote two short bourrées in his Notebook for Anna Magdalena Bach. His Bourrée in E minor in his Lute Suite, BWV 996 is especially popular.

Handel wrote several bourrées in his solo chamber sonatas (for example the fourth movement of his Oboe sonata in C minor); however, perhaps his best-known is the seventh movement of the Water Music (Handel) suite.

In the 19th century Frédéric Chopin and Emmanuel Chabrier wrote bourrées for the piano (such as the latter's Bourrée fantasque, composed 1891). The Victorian English composer Hubert Parry included a bourrée in his Lady Radnor Suite (1894).

== In popular music ==
The bourrée has been used by a number of pop and rock music bands, particularly Bach's E minor Bourrée for the lute. In 1969 both Bakerloo and Jethro Tull released versions of this, the former as a single, "Drivin' Bachwards", on Harvest Records (HAR 5004) in July and on their self-titled debut album (Harvest SHVL 762) the following December, the latter on their August album Stand Up. Paul McCartney also stated that the Beatles had known the tune for a long time and that it had inspired his song Blackbird. Jimmy Page of Led Zeppelin often played the opening section of Bourrée in E minor as part of the solo of a live performance of Heartbreaker, and he has also described the acoustic guitar and recorder intro to Zeppelin's Stairway To Heaven as "a poor man's bourrée". Tenacious D play a short rendering in "Rock Your Socks" on their eponymous album and in "Classico" on their second album. Rock guitarist Blues Saraceno plays a jazz version in the beginning and end of the track "Bouree" on his third album, Hairpick.

Other adapted bourrées include:

- The instrumental "Evil Eye" from Yngwie Malmsteen's album Rising Force begins with bourrée by Johann Krieger
- The intro to the song "Totentanz" on thrash metal band Coroner's album R.I.P. is a bourrée composed by Robert de Visée
- The Fifth Estate's "Ding Dong! The Witch Is Dead" has a central section consisting of the bourrée by Michael Praetorius from Terpsichore
- The Family Stand's 2010 album In 1000 Years has a jazz version of bourrée in E minor
- Armin van Buuren's 2022 song "Pas de Bouree" from his Feel Again album series was loosely based on the dance
- The bourrée from George Frederic Handel's Water Music was used as the theme song for the PBS cooking show The Frugal Gourmet

== See also ==
- Country dance
- Polska
- Branle
