= P. Siris =

Early eighteenth century English dancer and choreographer

P. Siris was an English dancer, dancing master and choreographer. His first name and dates of birth and death are uncertain. He may have been born in France. He was active in London from about 1705 to at least 1735. In 1706 he published a translation of Feuillet’s Choregraphie (Paris, 1700) into English as The Art of Dancing at about the same time as the better known translation by John Weaver.

In his The Art of Dancing, which explains the Beauchamp-Feuillet notation and gives two notated dance examples, Siris says that he studied with Pierre Beauchamp, the true creator of the notation, "about 18 years before".

There are 5 extant examples of dances he choreographed, notated, and published:

- La Camilla, 1708, a rigadoon
- The Brawl of Audenarde, 1709, a dance suite: courante, minuet, gigue
- The New English Passepied, 1712
- The Siciliana, 1714
- The Diana, 1725, dedicated to Lady Diana Spencer, whom he also taught when she was 14, December 1724 to May 1725.

The names of two other dances are known:

- The Dutchess, 1711
- The Princess Anna, 1715, a gavotte

He is mentioned as a dance performer in London in 1705 and 1706.

He was one of the subscribers to the 1735 publication of The Art of Dancing by Kellom Tomlinson.
