= Josias Priest =

English dancer and choreographer (c.1645–1734)

Josias Priest (c. 1645 – April 1734 or 3 January 1735 in Chelsea, London) was an English dancer, dancing-master and choreographer.

== Biography ==
In 1668, Priest was a dancing-master in Holborn, and in 1669, he was arrested along with four others for dancing and making music without a license. In 1675 he moved to Leicester Fields to run a boarding school for gentlewomen. In 1680, he started a similar school at Gorge's House in Chelsea, London which stood just behind what is now Lindsey Row, between Beaufort Street and Milman's Row. Here Priest hosted operas, including John Blow's Venus and Adonis (1684) and Henry Purcell's Dido and Aeneas (1689). It is widely believed that Priest choreographed dances for these and other semi-operas by Purcell, including Dioclesian, The Fairy-Queen, The Indian Queen, and King Arthur; however, the evidence is not entirely conclusive.

In 1699, Thomas Bray published a collection of dance music which included music for dances by Josias Priest and his son, Thomas Priest. Only one dance by Priest survives, a 'Minuet by Mr Preist' in An Essay for the Further Improvement of Dancing (1711) published by Edmund Pemberton. References to Priest's choreography remain in some musical sources, however. The surviving minuet is for twelve women and uses a limited step vocabulary of minuet steps forwards, backwards and sideways, the main choreographic interest being in the floor patterns. It is recorded in a simplified form of Beauchamp–Feuillet notation that was typically used for recording English country dances.

== Bibliography ==
- Jennifer Thorp. "Josias Priest", Grove Music Online, ed. L. Macy (accessed July 22, 2006).
