= Pierre Beauchamp =

French choreographer, dancer, and composer (1631-1705)

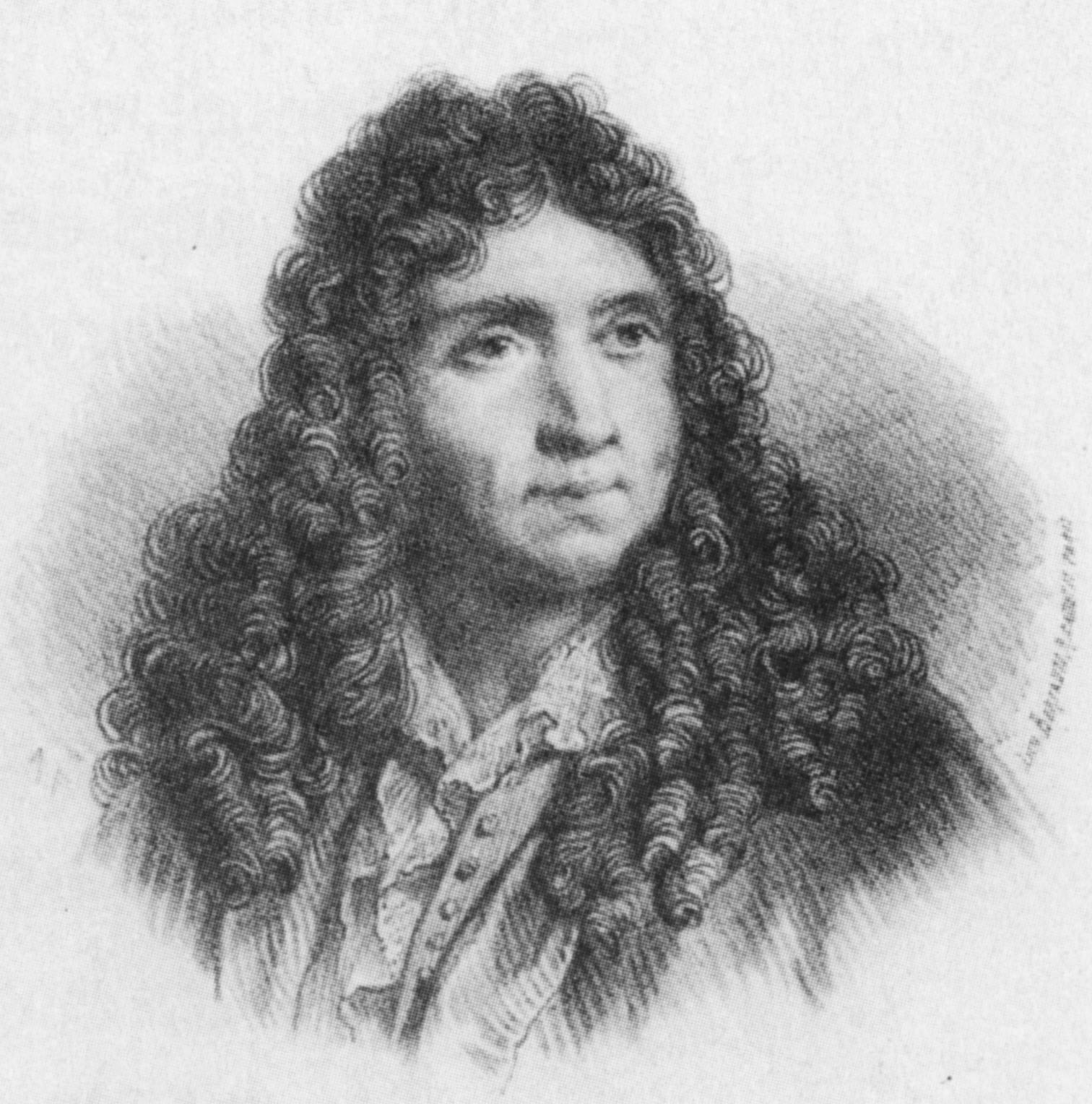
Pierre Beauchamp

Pierre Beauchamp or Beauchamps (French pronunciation: [pjɛʁ boʃɑ̃]; 30 October 1631 – February 1705) was a French choreographer, dancer and composer, and the probable inventor of Beauchamp–Feuillet notation. His grand-father was called Christophe (a musician) and his father, a violinist of the king's chamber, was simply called Louis. Following a custom of the time, Pierre Beauchamp was named Pierre after his godfather Pierre Vacherot, tailor of the queen's pages and a relative of the Beauchamps family.

== Biography ==
Beauchamp was born at Versailles (Yvelines), into a family of French "dance masters" (maîtres de danse). He débuted at the court of Louis XIV at age 12, in 1648, in the Ballet du dérèglement des passions. He was made director of the Académie Royale de Danse in 1671 (although he was not a founding member of the Académie as is often claimed). Beauchamp was principal choreographer to Molière's acting company (the Troupe du Roy) during 1664-1673, as well as ballet master at the Académie Royale de Musique and Compositeur des Ballets du Roi. He also gave dance lessons to Louis XIV for over twenty-two years. In these positions, he was highly influential in the development of French baroque dance. He continued to choreograph and dance at the Court of Versailles after the death of Jean-Baptiste Lully in 1687; however, choreography and composition of music and ballets for the Jesuit Colleges became his primary occupation from 1697. He died at Paris in 1705.

Writing some years after the actual events, Pierre Rameau credits Beauchamp with the codification of the five positions of the feet in classical ballet, as well as a role in the development of the use of arms (note though that, unlike the positions of the feet, the use of arms in baroque dance differs significantly from their use in ballet). The codification method was printed in 1700 by Raoul-Auger Feuillet, who published notated dance scores, and became known as Beauchamp–Feuillet notation. It was slightly modified by Pierre Rameau in 1725, but continued to be used to record dances for the stage and for domestic use throughout the eighteenth century.

Two choreographies survive in manuscript copies with attributions to Beauchamp: the ballroom duet Rigaudons de Mr Bauchand, and the theatrical solo for a man Sarabande de Mr. de Beauchamp. The sarabande is unusual amongst the surviving male solos because, although it requires a virtuoso technique with its pirouettes and many ornamented steps, it contains no aerial beaten steps.

== Selected works ==
=== With Molière and Lully ===
- Les Fâcheux, choreography, musical composition, orchestral director (1661)
- Le Mariage forcé (1664)
- Le Bourgeois gentilhomme, ballets (1669)
- Les Amants magnifiques (1670)
- Psyché, ballets (1671)
- Le Malade imaginaire, ballets (1673)

=== Original Choreography for Pierre Perrin ===
- Pomone (opera, 1671)

=== Choreography with Lully ===
- L'Impatience (1661)
- La Naissance de Vénus (1665)
- Alceste (1674)
- Atys (1676)
- Isis (1677)
- Le Triomphe de l'amour, avec Pécour (1681)
- Ballet de la jeunesse (1686)
