= Minuet (disambiguation) =

A minuet is a social dance of French origin for two people.

Minuet or Menuet may also refer to:

== Animals ==
- Minuet (horse) (1812–1833), a British Thoroughbred racehorse and broodmare
- Minuet cat, a domestic cat breed

== Arts and entertainment ==
- Minuet step, the dance step performed in a minuet
- Minuet (film), a 1982 Belgian-Dutch film
- Minuet, a 1955 novel by Louis Paul Boon
- "Minuet", a song by Idina Menzel from Still I Can't Be Still
- Minuet, a fictional holographic character in the Star Trek: The Next Generation episode "11001001"

== Computing ==
- MenuetOS, an operating system
- Minnesota Internet Users Essential Tool, an Internet suite

== See also ==
- Minaret, an architectural feature of Islamic mosques
- Minute (disambiguation)
