= Masters in This Hall =

Christmas carol

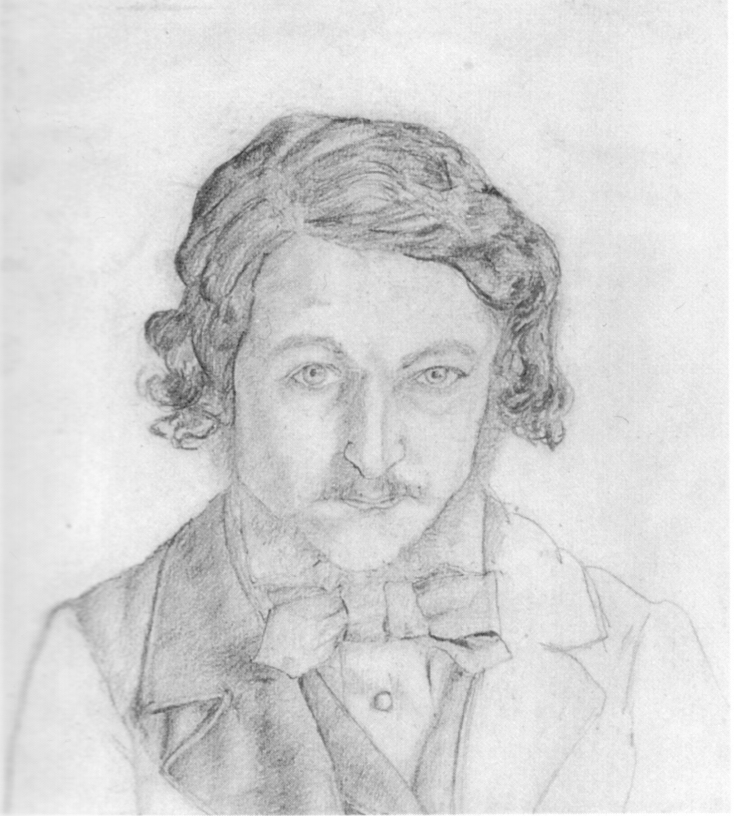
William Morris, self-portrait of 1856

"Masters in This Hall" (alternative title: "Nowell, Sing We Clear") is a Christmas carol with words written around 1860 by the English poet and artist William Morris to an old French dance tune. The carol is moderately popular around the world but has not entered the canon of most popular carols.

== Tune ==
The French composer Marin Marais composed the tune as a dance for his opera Alcyone of 1706, with the title Marche pour les Matelots.

The tune was subsequently included in Raoul Auger Feuillet's 1706 Recueil de contredanse along with a longways proper dance, La Matelotte, which Feuillet had himself written to go with the tune.

In 1710 John Essex (d. 1744) published an English translation of Feuillet's work called, For the Further Improvement of Dancing, in which the dance is given as The Female Saylor.

== Words ==
The words were written around 1860 while William Morris, then 26, was working as an apprentice in the office of the architect, Edmund Street, presumably under the persuasion of his fellow students who at that time had a taste for part-song.

The architect and musician Edmund Sedding had at one point also been in the office of G. E. Street and he had discovered the tune at a meeting with the organist at Chartres Cathedral. It was included in Sedding's collection of Nine Antient and Goodly Carols for the Merry Tide of Christmas (1860). In 1884 the poet Algernon Charles Swinburne described this carol as "one of the co-equal three finest ... in the language." According to Swinburne, the carol was also included, at his suggestion, in the publisher Arthur Bullen's A Christmas Garland: Carols and Poems from the Fifteenth Century to the Present (1885).

== Derivative works ==
Gustav Holst incorporated the carol into his work Three Carols (1916–17) along with "Christmas Song: On this Day" and "I Saw Three Ships". Holst wrote the Three Carols for amateurs singing in his Thaxted festivals. The carols are all for unison choir with orchestral or organ accompaniment.

== Description ==
"Masters in This Hall" is said to have a sixteenth-century feel, harking back to a simpler society, in line with Morris's own romanticism. It also has elements of Morris's socialist beliefs, with the poor bringing news of Christ's birth to the "Masters in this Hall" and a warning to the proud.

The image of raising up the poor and casting down the proud is derived from the song of the Virgin Mary, commonly known as the Magnificat, sung upon the occasion of her visit to her relative Saint Elizabeth, mother of John the Baptist, as related in Luke 1:51.

In Morris's original version there are twelve verses, though today only four or five are generally sung.

The carol is narrated by a poor man, who recounts to local gentry a tale of meeting shepherds travelling to Bethlehem and following them to see the Christ child in his mother's arms. The chorus repeats how the birth of Christ has raised up the poor and cast down the proud.

== Extract ==
Masters in this Hall,
Hear ye news to-day
Brought from over sea,
And ever I you pray:

Chorus
Nowell! Nowell! Nowell!
Nowell, sing we clear!
Holpen are all folk on earth,
Born is God's son so dear:
Nowell! Nowell! Nowell!
Nowell, sing we loud!
God to-day hath poor folk raised
And cast a-down the proud.

— Stanza 1 & Chorus

== See also ==
- List of Christmas carols

== Bibliography ==
- A Christmas Garland: Carols and Poems From The Fifteenth Century To The Present Time published by A. H. Bullen With Seven Illustrations newly designed By Henry G. Wells, London. Printed by John C. Nimmo 14, King William Street, Strand, W.C. 1885 At the Internet Archive
- Ancient English Christmas Carols, 1400–1700, Edith Rickert, London, Chatto & Windus, 1910 Reprinted 1914, 1928 Hymns and Carols at Christmas
