= Rigadon =

Rigadon can refer to:

- A Baroque dance, also spelt as Rigaudon
- The renamed character of Passepartout from the 1980s cartoon series Around the World with Willy Fog.
