= The Loves of Mars and Venus =

Ballet

The Loves of Mars and Venus by John Weaver was arguably the first modern ballet, the first dance work to tell a story through dance, gesture and music alone. Its first performance was at London's Drury Lane Theatre on Saturday 2 March 1717.

== Background ==
Before 1717 ballet had always been part of operas and plays and dependent on their words to narrate the drama. The Loves of Mars and Venus was a danced drama, equal to the plays seen on London’s stage, described in its own time as a ‘Dramatic Entertainment of Dancing’, "the first of this kind produced upon the British Stage or in the Kingdom". All the action was conveyed in dance and mime alone, setting a pattern for future ballets".

== The story ==
Its immediate source was Peter Anthony Motteux's play, The Loves of Mars and Venus, written in 1695. With six scenes full of dancing and gestures, It lasted an estimated 40 minutes.

== The performance ==
At the first performances of The Loves of Mars and Venus, Mars was danced by Louis Dupré, Venus was Hester Santlow and John Weaver himself danced Vulcan. Dupré was a virtuoso dancer who was probably French, although he was probably not the famous 'Le grand' Dupré of the Paris Opera. Mrs Santlow was an English dancer-actress, greatly admired for her beauty as well as her dancing skills – one contemporary described her as 'incomparable'. Weaver's stage skills were essentially those of a comic dancer, although he was obviously also a master of rhetorical gesture. They were supported by Drury Lane’s best dancers as the 'Followers' of Mars and Venus, with the company's comedians as Weaver's workmen the Cyclops.

== Reception and subsequent history ==
The Loves of Mars and Venus was an undoubted success, with seven performances during its first season and revivals at the Drury Lane Theatre until 1724. Colley Cibber the English actor-manager, playwright and Poet Laureate, said of it 'To give even Dancing therefore some Improvement; and to make it something more than Motion without Meaning, the Fable of Mars and Venus, was form'd into a connected Presentation of Dances in Character, wherein the Passions were so happily expressed, and the whole Story so intelligibly told, by a mute Narration of Gesture only, that even thinking Spectators allow'd it both a pleasing and a rational Entertainment'. It also inspired a parody version by John Rich.

== 300th anniversary performance ==
The Weaver Dance Company, was founded in 2016, to produce a show to celebrate the 300th anniversary of the first performance of The Loves of Mars and Venus. Weaver created a patchwork to make his musical score, a pasticcio, but it has been lost. So a pasticcio was pieced together using music from the London stage of the day with works by Jean-Baptiste Lully (1632–87), Jacques Paisible (c1656–1721), Henry Purcell (1659–95), Gottfried Finger (c1660–1730), John Eccles (1668–1735), Jeremiah Clarke (c1674–1704), and William Croft (1678–1727), using Weaver's text as a guide.

As a reconstruction of the full dance-drama with its cast of 26 characters was beyond the Company’s resources, they set out to create a show that would introduce the audience to the world of the 18th-century London stage and John Weaver's frustrations with the limitations of dancing there, following Weaver as he tries to create his first 'Dramatick Entertainment of Dancing' with dance taking an equal place as an art alongside music and drama.

Using John Weaver’s own published scenario to reconstruct the gestures and theatrical dances recorded in Beauchamp–Feuillet notation in the early 18th century as the basis for new choreography, The Weaver Dance Company presented their The Loves of Mars and Venus, exactly 300 years to the day after the first performance, at the Fitzwilliam College Auditorium in Cambridge on 2 March 2017.
