= Gavotte =

French folk dance

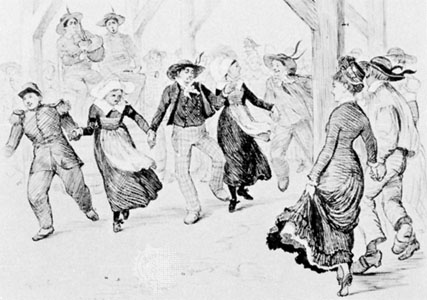
A gavotte in Brittany, France, 1878

The gavotte (also gavot, gavote, or gavotta) is a French dance, taking its name from a folk dance of the Gavot, the people of the Pays de Gap region of Dauphiné in the southeast of France, where the dance originated, according to one source. According to another reference, the word gavotte is a generic term for a variety of French folk dances, and most likely originated in Lower Brittany in the west, or possibly Provence in the southeast or the French Basque Country in the southwest of France. It is notated in 4/4 or 2/2 time and is usually of moderate tempo, though the folk dances also use meters such as 9/8 and 5/8.

In late 16th-century Renaissance dance, the gavotte is first mentioned as the last of a suite of branles. Popular at the court of Louis XIV, it became one of many optional dances in the classical suite of dances. Many were composed by Lully, Rameau and Gluck, and the 17th-century cibell is a variety. The dance was popular in France throughout the 18th century and spread widely. In early courtly use the gavotte involved kissing, but this was replaced by the presentation of flowers.

The gavotte of the 16th, 17th, and 18th centuries has nothing in common with the 19th-century column-dance called the "gavotte" but may be compared with the rigaudon and the bourrée.

== Etymology ==
The term gavotte for a lively dance originated in the 1690s from Old Provençal gavoto (mountaineer's dance) from gavot, a local name for an Alpine resident, said to mean literally "boor", "glutton", from gaver (to stuff, force-feed poultry) from Old Provençal gava (crop). The word is cognate to French gavache (coward, dastard). The Italianized form is gavotta.

== Musical characteristics ==
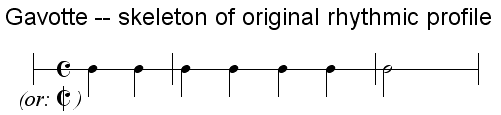
Gavotte rhythm

The phrases of the 18th-century French court gavotte begin in the middle of the bar, creating a half-measure (half-bar) upbeat. However the music for the earlier court gavotte, first described by Thoinot Arbeau in 1589, invariably began on the downbeat of a duple measure. Later composers also wrote gavottes that began on the downbeat rather than on the half-measure: an example is Jean-Philippe Rameau's Gavotte Variée in A minor for keyboard. Various folk gavottes found in mid-20th-century Brittany are danced to music in 4/4, 2/4, 9/8, and 5/8 time.

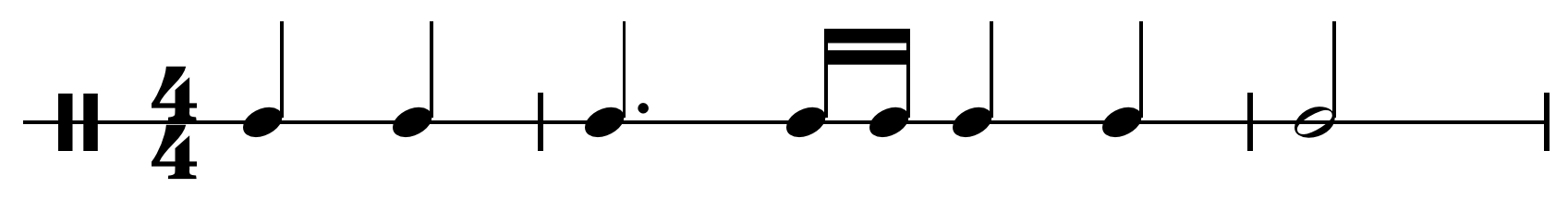
Another typical gavotte rhythm

In the ballroom the gavotte was often paired with a preceding triple-time minuet: both dances are stately, and the gavotte's lifted step contrasted with the shuffling minuet step. It had a steady rhythm, not broken up into faster notes.

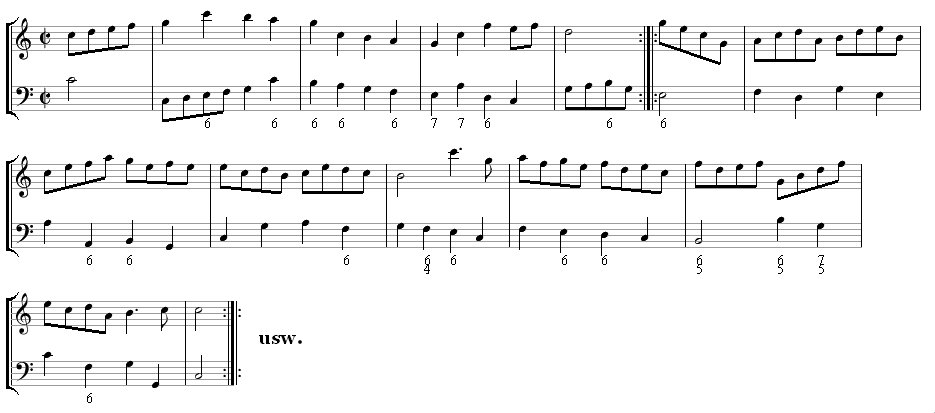
"A tempo di Gavotti" from Handel's Recorder Sonata in C major, HWV 365

In the Baroque suite the gavotte is played after (or sometimes before) the sarabande. Like most dance movements of the Baroque period it is typically in binary form but this may be extended by a second melody in the same metre, often one called the musette, having a pedal drone to imitate the French bagpipes, played after the first to create a grand ternary form; A–(A)–B–A. There is a Gavotte en Rondeau ("Gavotte in rondo form") in J.S. Bach's Partita No. 3 in E Major for solo violin, BWV 1006.

The gavotte could be played at a variety of tempos: Johann Gottfried Walther wrote that the gavotte is "often quick but occasionally slow".

== Renaissance ==
The gavotte is first described in the late 16th century as a suite or miscellany of double branles danced in a line or circle to music in duple time, "with little springs in the manner of the Haut Barrois" branle and with some of the steps "divided" with figures borrowed from the galliard.

The basic gavotte step, as described by Arbeau, is that of the common or double branle, a line of dancers moving alternately to the left and right with a double à gauche and double à droite, each requiring a count of four. In the double branle these composite steps consist of; a pied largi (firm outward step), a pied approche (the other foot drawn near to the first), another pied largi and a pied joint (the other foot drawn against the first).

In the gavotte's double à gauche a skip (petit saut) is inserted after each of the four components; the second pied largi is replaced by a marque pied croisé (the following foot crosses over the left with toe contacting the floor); the final pied approche is replaced by a grève croisée (the right foot crosses over the left, raised).

The double à droite begins with a pieds joints and petit saut, followed by two quick steps, a marque pied gauche croisé and marque pied droit croisé, during beat two, a grève droit croisée and petit saut on beat three and on the last beat pieds joints and a capriole (leap into the air with entrechat).

== Baroque ==
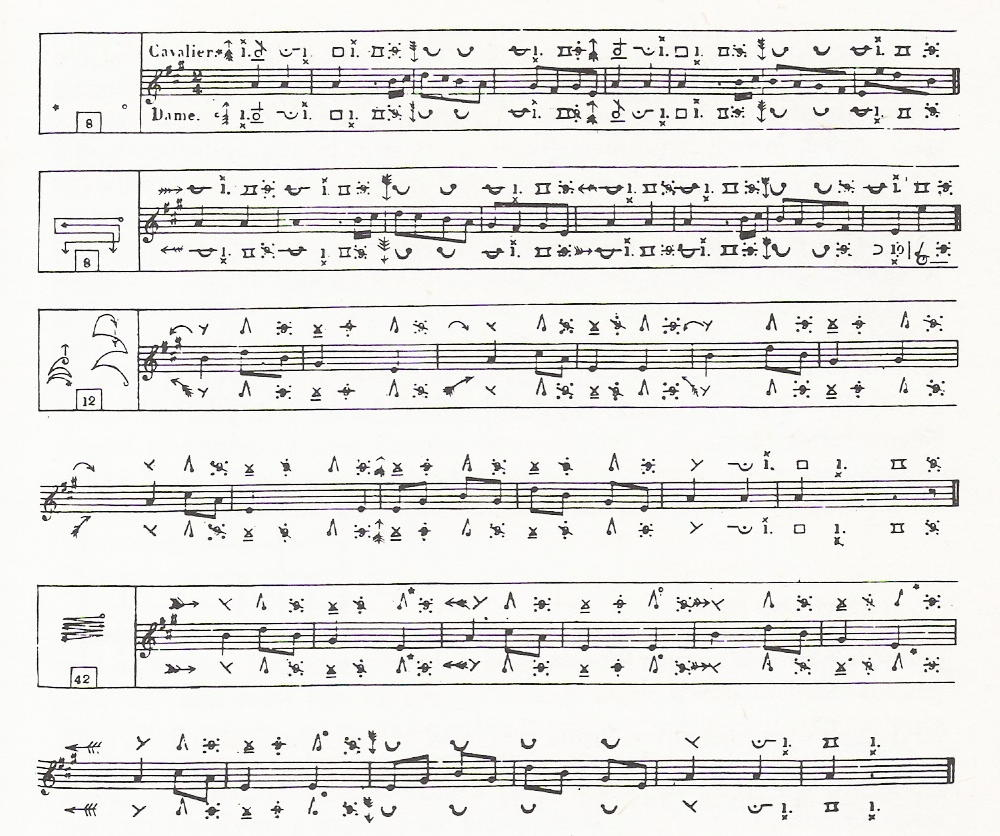
Music and choreography of a gavotte, by Vestris

The gavotte became popular in the court of Louis XIV where Jean-Baptiste Lully was the leading court composer. Gaétan Vestris did much to define the dance. Subsequently many composers of the Baroque period incorporated the dance as one of many optional additions to the standard instrumental suite of the era. The examples in suites and partitas by Johann Sebastian Bach are well known.

Movements of early 18th-century musical works entitled Tempo di gavotta sometimes indicated the sense of a gavotte rhythm or movement, without fitting the number of measures or strains typical of the actual dance. Examples of these can be found in the works of Arcangelo Corelli or Johann Sebastian Bach.

George Frideric Handel wrote a number of gavottes, including the fifth-and-final movement, Allegro, of the Concerto Grosso in B-flat major, Op. 3, No. 2, HWV 313.

== Later examples ==
Composers in the 19th century wrote gavottes that began, like the 16th-century gavotte, on the downbeat rather than on the half-measure upbeat. The famous Gavotte in D by Gossec is such an example, as is the Gavotte in Massenet's Manon but not the one in Ambroise Thomas's Mignon. A gavotte also occurs in the second act of The Gondoliers and the Act I finale of Ruddigore, both by Gilbert and Sullivan.

Edvard Grieg's suite From Holberg's Time, based on eighteenth-century dance forms, features a "Gavotte" as its third movement (1884).

Gavotte (1909) by Fred Werner

Australian composer Fred Werner used a gavotte he composed for teaching students.

Igor Stravinsky's ballet Pulcinella features a "Gavotta con due variazioni", as number 18, and movement VI in the suite (1922).

Sergei Prokofiev employs a gavotte instead of a minuet in his Symphony No. 1 (Classical), Op. 25 (1917), and includes another one as the second of his Ten Piano Pieces Op. 12 (1913), and another as the third of his Four Piano Pieces, Op. 32 (1918).

Leonard Bernstein's Candide has a "Venice Gavotte" in act 2.

"The Ascot Gavotte" is a song in the 1956 musical My Fair Lady by Alan Jay Lerner and Frederick Loewe.

== In popular culture ==
Samuel Siegel and Roy Butin play "Gavotte"
A 1909 Edison Amberol recording of Samuel Siegel on mandolin and Roy Butin on guitar

- Early 20th century musician Samuel Siegel recorded a ragtime mandolin tune "Gavotte".
- Carly Simon's song "You're So Vain" includes the lyric "You had one eye in the mirror as you watched yourself gavotte". In this context it means "moving in a pretentious manner".
- The Stephen Sondheim musical Sunday in the Park with George uses the word gavotte as a satirical device in the otherwise irregular, non-steadily rhythmical, song "It's Hot Up Here" to start the second act, "We're stuck up here in this gavotte".
- The Johnny Mercer song "Strip Polka" includes the lyric "Oh, she hates corny waltzes and she hates the gavotte".
- Geneticist W. D. Hamilton in his paper "Gamblers since life began: barnacles, aphids, elms." in The Quarterly Review of Biology (1975) referred to the drilled formality of the mechanisms of individual reproduction as "the gavotte of chromosomes".
- Philosopher Stephen David Ross characterises metaphysical aporia as "the disruptive side of a tradition that needs both repetition and its annihilation for intelligibility. It is a site at which same and other dance their unending gavotte of life and death."
- Agustín Barrios wrote a solo guitar piece, "Madrigal Gavotte", which is a combination of the two styles.
- In the anime Kiniro no Corda (La Corda d'Oro), "Gavotte in D" by Gossec is heard many times, though referred to only as "Gavotte".
- In the 1990 novel Good Omens by Terry Pratchett and Neil Gaiman, it is noted that one cannot determine how many angels can dance on the head of a pin, because angels do not dance—the exception being the Principality Aziraphale, who once learned to do the gavotte in a discreet gentlemen's club in Portland Place in the late 1880s.
- In the Broadway musical 1776 during the song "Cool, Considerate Men", reference is made to "Mr. Adams' new gavotte"—a reference regarding John Adams' ideas for a declaration of independence from Great Britain.
- In the 1967 film How to Succeed in Business Without Really Trying the song "A Secretary Is Not a Toy" refers to a gavotte. The song discourages personal indiscretions with secretaries at the firm. The reference to a gavotte is meant to be ironic, as the original dance accompanying the song from the Broadway show was a modified gavotte.
- In the manga One Piece, the character Brook (and the zombie Ryuma, which was given life by Brook's shadow) has a signature technique, Gavotte Bond en Avant.
- In the Robert Pinsky poem "Impossible To Tell", the gavotte is mentioned in the first line.
- In John Updike's novel Bech at Bay, for the protagonist, "It embarrassed him that for these young Czechs American writing, its square dance of lame old names, should appear such a lively gavotte, prancing carefree into the future."
- In the mid-nineteenth-century novel The Scout, William Gilmore Simms describes a lonely sentry: "He sang, and whistled, and soliloquized; and, not unfrequently, relieved the dull measured step of the sentinel by the indulgence of such a gavotte as a beef-eating British soldier of the 'prince's own' might be supposed capable of displaying in that period of buckram movement."
- Describing American foreign policy in the wake of the September 11 attacks, author Norman Podhoretz says, "Far from 'rushing into war', we were spending months dancing a diplomatic gavotte in the vain hope of enlisting the help of France, Germany, and Russia."
- Polish resistance fighter Jan Kamieński (1906–1987) describes his personal experience of the chaos of the first German air strike on Poland in these terms: "Paintings were falling off the walls, the Biedermeier sofa and its complement of chairs bounced around as if dancing some crazy gavotte, the Bechstein grand piano slid past me on two of its casters ...".
- The poem "Wakefulness" (1998) by John Ashbery includes the sentence: "A gavotte of dust-motes / came to replace my seeing."
- In the poem "12/2/80" from Waltzing Matilda (1981), Alice Notley writes: "A leaf if local / only when falling. // 'What? like a gavotte?' / the common evergreen rustle: / hours & regulations & so on ...",
- Chas & Dave produced a song called "Give it Gavotte" which uses this style on their 1982 album Job Lot.
- In "The Wild Wood", the third chapter of Kenneth Grahame's 1908 novel The Wind in the Willows, one of the lines describing the blooming spring is "Comfrey, the purple hand-in-hand with the white, crept forth to take its place in the line; and at last one morning the diffident and delaying dog-rose stepped delicately on the stage, and one knew, as if string-music had announced it in stately chords that strayed into a gavotte, that June at last was here."
