= Rigaudon =

French baroque dance

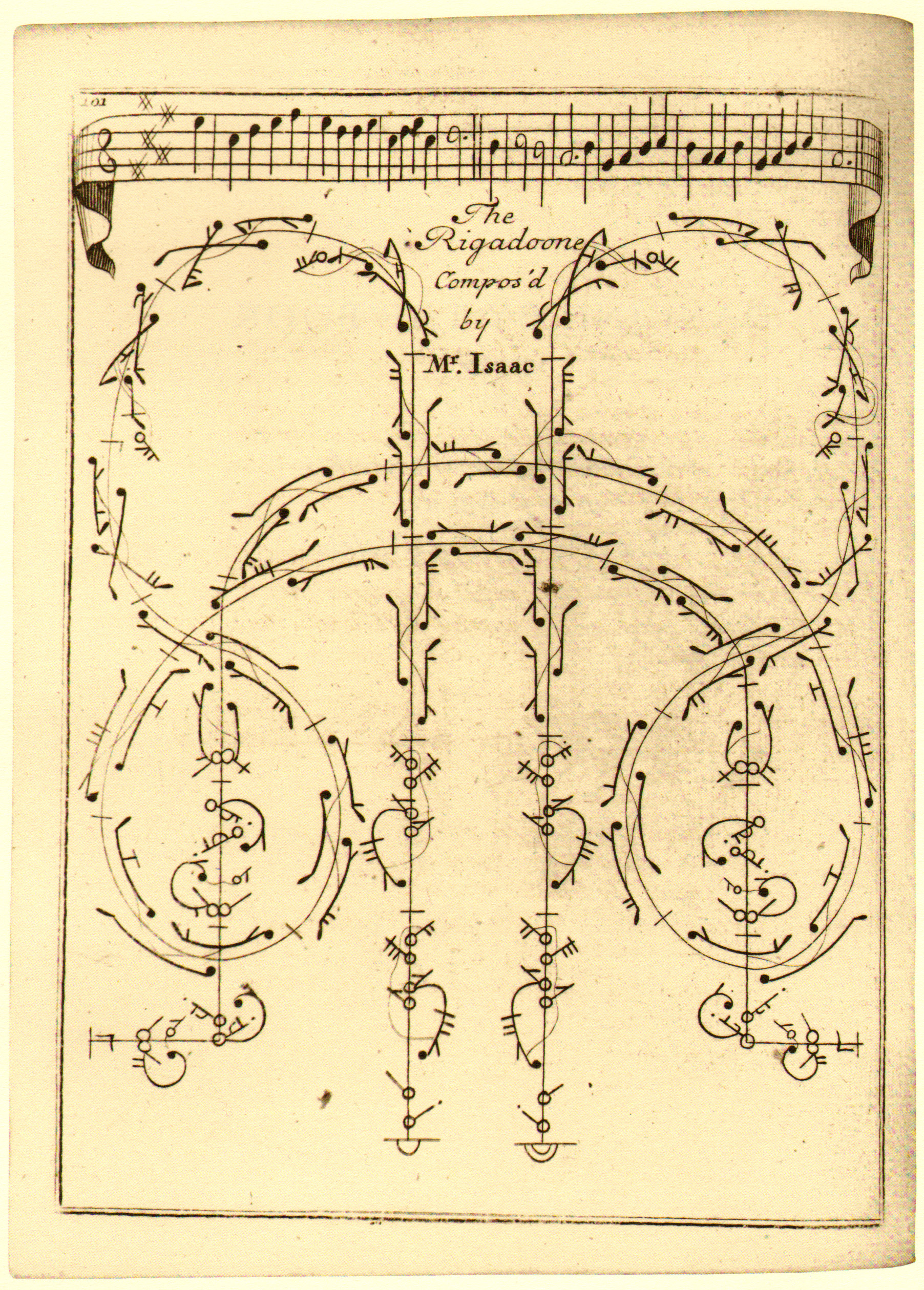
dance notation for the first 18 bars of a rigadoon by Isaac, published in Orchesography or the Art of Dancing ... an Exact and Just Translation from the French of Monsieur Feuillet; by John Weaver, Dancing Master. Second edition. Walsh, London, c. 1721.

The rigaudon (French: [ʁiɡodɔ̃, ʁiɡɔdɔ̃], Occitan: [riɣawˈðu]), anglicized as rigadon or rigadoon, is a French baroque dance with a lively duple metre. The music is similar to that of a bourrée, but the rigaudon is rhythmically simpler with regular phrases (eight measure phrases are most common). It originated as a sprightly 17th-century French folk dance for couples. Traditionally, the folkdance was associated with the provinces of Vivarais, Languedoc, Dauphiné, and Provence in southern France, and it became popular as a court dance during the reign of Louis XIV. Its hopping steps were adopted by the skillful dancers of the French and English courts, where it remained fashionable through the 18th century. By the close of the 18th century, however, it had given way in popularity as a ballroom dance (along with the passepied, bourrée, and gigue) to the minuet. In the 20th century, Maurice Ravel would employ this baroque dance in his piano suite Le Tombeau de Couperin.
