= Gottfried Taubert =

German choreaographer (1670–1746)

Gottfried Taubert (baptized 30 July 1670 – July 6, 1746) was a German dance master (maître de danse) of the Baroque period.

== Life ==
Taubert was born in Ronneburg, Saxe-Altenburg, the son of Christoph Tauber[t] and of Anna Brämmer. He attended lectures at Leipzig University from 1686 and from 1693. Until 1695, he studied in the fair city. In 1702, he settled in Danzig, but returned to Leipzig in 1715, where he published his extensive dance book Rechtschaffener Tanzmeister in 1717. It also contains the first German translation of the French Choreography by Raoul-Auger Feuillet as well as the instructions of the dances after Raoul-Auger Feuillet and Louis Pécour. From about 1730 until his death, he was court dance master in Zerbst.

Taubert may have exerted the most lasting influence among German dance book authors. It is ultimately the most comprehensive record of the German reception of Baroque French dance. Tilden Russell brought out an English translation of this work in 2012, providing it with an introductory volume built on extensive preliminary studies. At the beginning of the 18th century, Leipzig was virtually a "stronghold of the academic art of dance", as Walter Salmen called it...). Taubert played a big part in making this happen.

Taubert died in Zerbst at the age of 75.

== Work ==
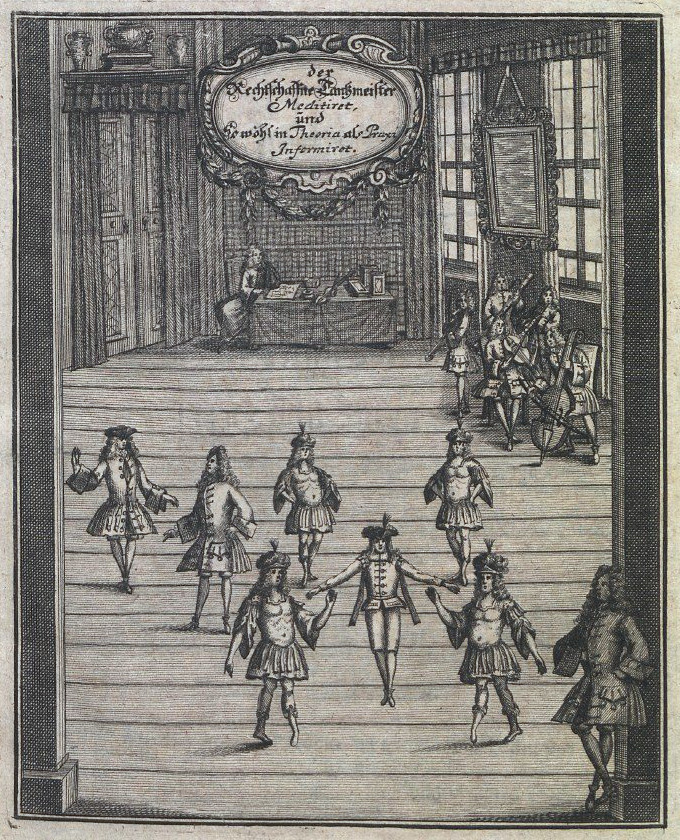
Der Rechtschaffne Tantzmeister

- Gottfried Taubert (1706). Kurtzer Entwurff Des Edlen so wohl natürlichen als künstlichen Tantz-Exercitii. Danzig.
- Gottfried Taubert (1717). Rechtschaffener Tantzmeister, oder gründliche Erklärung der Frantzösischen Tantz-Kunst. Vol. 3. Leipzig: Friedrich Lanckischens Erben.
