= Branle =

Medieval dance or music for said dance

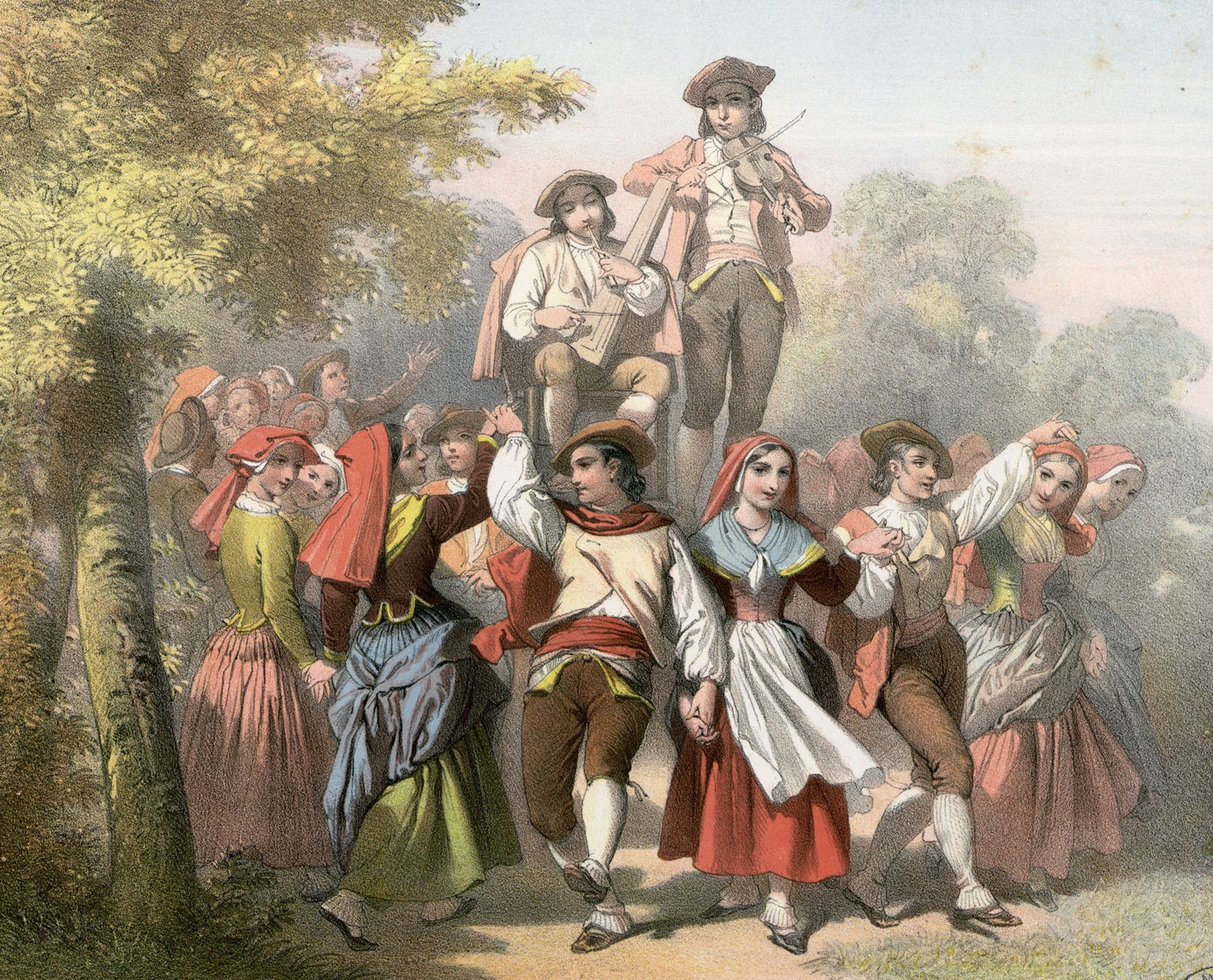
Branle d'Ossau by Alfred Dartiguenave, 1855–1856

A branle (/ˈbrænəl, ˈbrɑːl/ BRAN-əl, BRAHL, French: [bʁɑ̃l]), also bransle, brangle, brawl(e), brall(e), braul(e), brando (in Italy), bran (in Spain), or brantle (in Scotland), is a type of French dance popular from the early 16th century to the present, danced by couples in either a line or a circle. The term also refers to the music and the characteristic step of the dance.

== History ==
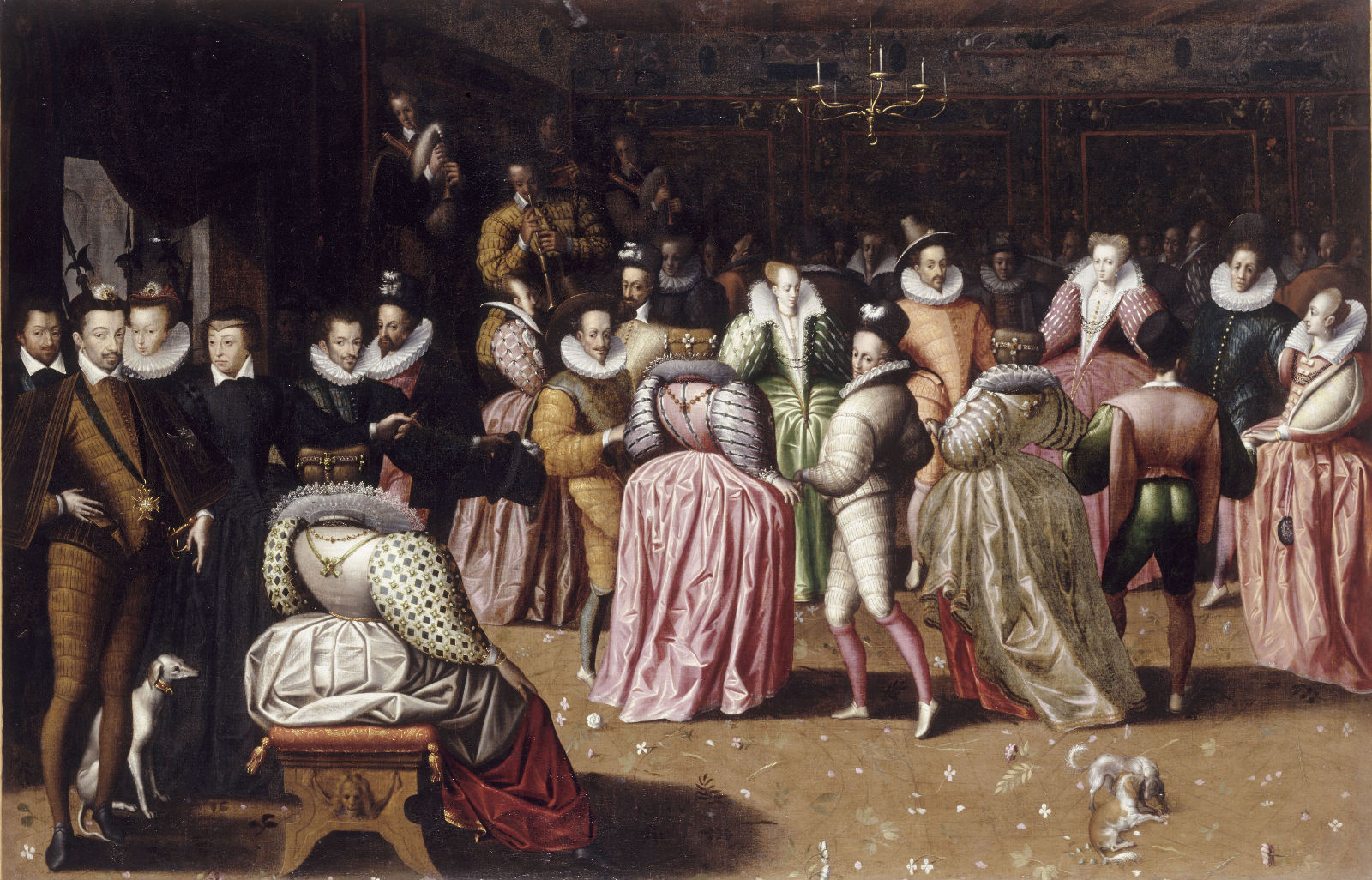
Branle à la cour de Henri III, French school, 1580s

=== Beginnings and courtly adoption ===
The name branle derives from the French verb branler (to shake, wave, sway, wag, wobble), referring to the side-to-side movement of a circle or chain of dancers holding hands or linking arms. Dances of this name are encountered from about 1500 and the term is used for dances still danced in France today. Before 1500, the only dance-related use of this word is the "swaying" step of the basse danse.

The branle was danced by a chain of dancers, usually in couples, with linked arms or holding hands. The dance alternated a number of larger sideways steps to the left (often four) with the same number of smaller steps to the right so that the chain moved gradually to the left.

Although originally French dances of rustic provenance, danced to the dancers' singing, the branle was adopted, like other folk-dances, into aristocratic use by the time that printed books allow us to reconstruct the dances. A variety of branles, attributed to different regions, were danced in sequence, so that the suite of branle music gives one of the earliest examples of the classical suite of dances. Such suites generally ended with a gavotte, which seems then to have been regarded as a species of branle.

Some aristocratic branles included pantomime elements, such the branle de Poitou, the possible ancestor of the minuet, which acts out gestures of courtship. Some of these dances were reserved for specific age groups - the branle de Bourgogne, for instance, for the youngest dancers. Branle music is generally in common time somewhat like the gavotte, though some variants, like that of Poitou, are in triple time. Branles were danced walking, running, gliding, or skipping depending on the speed of the music. Among the dance's courtly relations may be the basse danse and the passepied which latter, though it is in triple time, Rabelais and Thoinot Arbeau (1589) identify as a type of Breton branle.

=== The branle in Arbeau ===
The first detailed sources for the dance's steps are found in Arbeau's famous text-book Orchesography. Antonius de Arena briefly describes the steps for the double and single branle, and John Marston's The Malcontent (1604) sketches the choreography of one type. According to Arbeau, every ball began with the same four branles: the double, the single, the gay and the Burgundian branle. The double branle had a simple form involving two phrases of two bars each.

Arbeau gives choreographies for eight branles associated with specific regions; the Burgundian (see above) or Champagne, the Haut Barrois, the Montardon, the Poitou, the Maltese, the Scottish and the Trihory of Brittany; he also mentions four others without describing their steps; the branles of Camp, Hainaut, Avignon, and Lyon. Most of these dances seem to have a genuine connection to the region: the Trihory of Brittany, Arbeau says, was seldom if ever performed around Langres where his book was published, but "I learned it long ago from a young Breton who was a fellow student of mine at Poitiers".

On the other hand, Arbeau identifies some branles as adapted to ballet and mime. When his student Capriol asks whether the Maltese branle is native to Malta, rather than just "a fanciful invention for a ballet", Arbeau replies that he "cannot believe it to be other than a ballet". He also describes a "Hermit" branle based upon mime.

=== The suite of branles ===
There were several well-established branle suites of up to ten dances; the Branles de Champagne, the Branles de Camp, the Branles de Hainaut and the Branles d'Avignon. Arbeau named these suites branles coupés, which literally means "cut" or "intersected" branles but is usually translated as "mixed branles". Antonius de Arena mentions mixed branles (branlos decopatos) in his macaronic treatise Ad suos compagnones.

By 1623 such suites had been standardized into a set of six dances: premier branle, branle gay, branle de Poictou (also called branle à mener), branle double de Poictou, cinquiesme branle (by 1636 named branle de Montirandé), and a concluding gavotte. A variant is found in the Tablature de mandore (Paris, 1629) by François, Sieur de Chancy. A suite of seven dances collectively titled Branles de Boccan begins with a branle du Baucane, composed by the dancing master and violinist Jacques Cordier, known as "Bocan", followed by a second, untitled branle then the branle gay, branle de Poictu, branle double de Poictu, branle de Montirandé and la gavotte.

=== The fame of the branle ===
In the late 16th century in England the branle was mentioned by Shakespeare (Love's Labour's Lost, 3. 1. 7: "Will you win your love with a French brawl?"). In the 17th century it was danced at the courts of Louis XIV of France and Charles II of England, where it became "even more common than in France". There are even a few late examples in Beauchamp–Feuillet notation (invented in 1691), such as Danses nouvelles presentees au Roy (c. 1715) by Louis-Guillaume Pécour.

In Italy the branle became the brando, and in Spain the bran. The Branle seems to have travelled to Scotland and survived for some time as the brail. Emmanuel Adriaenssen includes a piece called Branle Englese in his book of lute music, Pratum Musicum (1584) and Thomas Tomkins' Worster Braules is included in the Fitzwilliam Virginal Book. But of thousands of lute pieces from England only 18 were called branle, though one called "courant" is known from continental sources as a branle.

=== Branles not choreographed by Arbeau ===
The Branle de Montirandé appears to be related to the Haut Barrois branle, which Arbeau says was "arranged to the tune of a branle of Montierandal" (probably Montier-en-Der, near Chaumont in the Haute Marne). This is danced in duple time, and as described by Arbeau has a similar structure to the double branle. Settings for this appear in the lute anthology Le trésor d'Orphée by Anthoine Francisque (1600) and the ensemble collection Terpsichore by Michael Praetorius (1612).

In John Marston's The Malcontent (1604), act 4, scene 2, the character Guerrino describes the steps of a dance called Beanchaes brawl (Bianca's branle):

t'is but two singles on the left, two on the right, three doubles forward, a trauerse of six round: do this twice, three singles side, galliard tricke of twentie, curranto pace; a figure of eight, three singles broken downe, come vp, meete two doubles, fall backe, and then honour.

The opening is the same as the Maltese branle described by Arbeau, but starting with "three singles side", there is an interpolation of "something presumably more athletic". The male dancer moves away from his partner before performing a "galliard trick of twenty"—apparently a number of capers or leaps in the manner of the galliard—before returning to the conventional ending.

== Revivals ==
- Francis Poulenc includes a Bransle de Champagne and a Bransle de Bourgogne in his Suite Française (1935).
- Igor Stravinsky includes a Bransle Simple, Bransle Gay, and Bransle de Poitou (Double) in his Agon (1957).
- The air of Arbeau's "Branle de l'Official" was adapted for the 20th-century English Christmas carol "Ding Dong Merrily on High".
- The Capriol Suite by the British composer Peter Warlock features a bransles as its fourth movement. The piece is a collection of six folk dances arranged originally for four hands piano, but was then arranged by Warlock for both string orchestra and full orchestra.
