= John Essex =

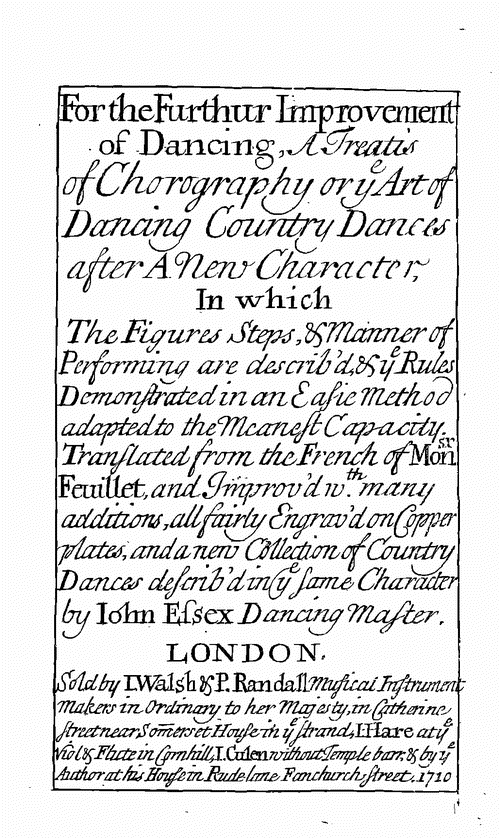
Frontispiece of John Essex's For the Further Improvement of Dancing (1710)

John Essex (c. 1680 – 1744, London) was an English dancer, choreographer and writer who promoted the recording of dance steps through notation as well as performing in London theatre. In 1728 he published his major work The Dancing-Master, or, The Art of Dancing Explained, a translation of Pierre Rameau's Le maître à danser (1725).

== Life ==
He is first mentioned in record in 1702 as a dancer at Drury Lane Theatre, performing serious and comic dances. In 1703 he left after a dispute with the manager, Christopher Rich. He set up as an independent dance teacher and teacher of music in Rood Lane (off Fenchurch Street) in the parish of St Dionis Backchurch in the City of London.

He became part of a group of dance teachers who sought to modernise and improve the teaching and recording of dancing. These included a Mr Isaac, Thomas Caverley, and John Weaver.

Essex was involved in several publications in the early 1700s which brought to England and explained the dance notations of the French dance masters Raoul Auger Feuillet and Pierre Rameau. Essex translated the introduction to Feuillet's Recueil de contredances (1706), and was the author of a treatise on the notation of country dances entitled, For the Further Improvement of Dancing (1710). In 1715 a second edition was printed containing 4 additional country dances to supplement the original 10 and "The Princess's Passpied", his only surviving ball dance. His most important book appeared in 1728 The Dancing-Master, or, The Art of Dancing Explained, which was a translation with diagrams of Rameau's Le maître à danser (1725). This ran to a second edition in 1731 and a third about 1733 which included new illustrations by George Bickham the Younger. A fourth edition appeared in 1744, the year of his death.

In 1721 he authored The Young Ladies Conduct, or, Rules for Education, for its day an orthodox treatise on female education, apart from the emphasis it puts on the usefulness of dancing.

In 1724 he returned to performance, appearing at Drury Lane and later at The Haymarket Theatre.

With his wife Catherine (née Hawtayne, died 1721), he had six children of whom three died in infancy, all are recorded in the parish register of St Dionis Backchurch.
