= Minute (disambiguation) =

A minute is a unit used to measure time.

Minute or minutes may also refer to:

- Minute of arc, a unit used to measure angles
- Minute (newspaper), a French far-right newspaper
- Minute (basketball), a statistic in basketball
- Minutes, the document in which the proceedings of a court or a meeting are recorded
- Minutes (album), a 1984 album by Elkie Brooks
- The Minutes (band), an Irish rock band
- The Minutes (album), a 2013 album by Alison Moyet
- The Minutes (play), a 2017 play by Tracy Letts

== See also ==
- Manute (disambiguation)
