= Minuet step =

The minuet step is the dance step performed in the dance minuet. It "is composed of four plain straight Steps or Walks, and may be performed forwards, backward, sideways, &c." (Tomlinson 1735, 103) or in a square. The steps are often referred to by direction to distinguish them. "A Movement, or Sink and Rise, being added to the first Step of the three belonging to the Minuet Step, produces a Bouree; and the like to the fourth and last a Half Coupee, which together compose what is commonly called the English Minuet Step" (Tomlinson 1735, 103–104).

"The second Method of its Performance is with a Bound; that is to say, instead of the Half Coupee or Movement to the last Step made upon the Floor, as in the aforesaid, you bound instead thereof, which is the only Variation from the foregoing" (Tomlinson 1735, 104).

"The third Method is quite the Reverse, because, instead of the Bouree, the Half Coupee is made first and afterwards the Bouree, or as the French term it, One and a Fleuret, which is usually called the French Step" (Tomlinson 1735, 104).

"The fourth Way of performing this Step is, by adding another Movement to the third Step of the aforesaid Fleuret, or the fourth of the Minuet Step; and it will then be notwithstanding the same Step, only of three Movements. As to the two first foregoing Steps, I shall say little concerning them, for the following Reasons: In the first Place, because they are now rarely, if ever, practised amongst Persons of the first Rank, and seem to be, for the present, intirely laid aside; not as being ungraceful, or that the Dancer could not give Pleasure to the Beholders, or raise to himself a Reputation, in their Performance, but merely through Alteration of Fashion, which varies in this Respect, as in Dressing, &c." (Tomlinson 1735, 104).

Variation and ornamentation of the basic steps was applied in three ways: (1) ad libitum variation on the frequency and order of the basic figures, (2) ad libitum variation of the step-pattern and ornamental foot and hand movements, and (3) special variant choreographies (menuets figurees) created by dancing masters for special occasions, for particular pupils, or for published manuals (these often required specially composed music to fit the choreographies) (Sutton 1985, 125).
