= Beauchamp-Feuillet notation =

System of Baroque dance notation

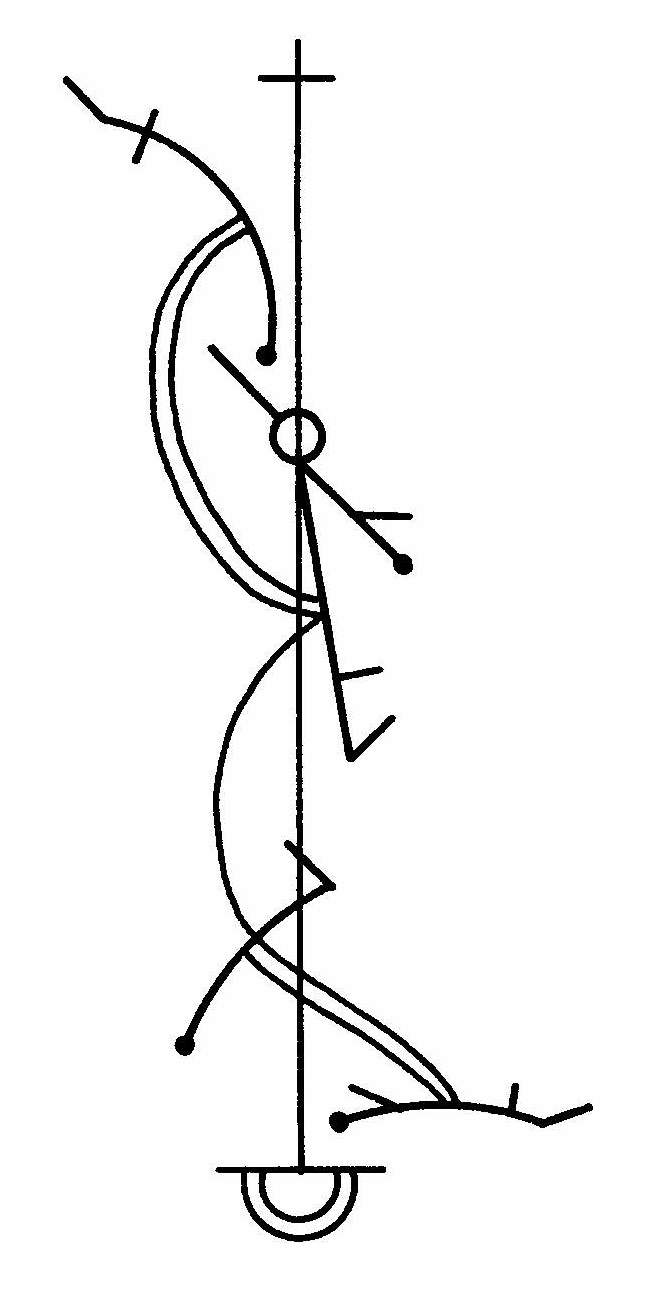
Notation for bar of a French courante by Judith Appleby

Beauchamp-Feuillet notation is a system of dance notation used in Baroque dance.

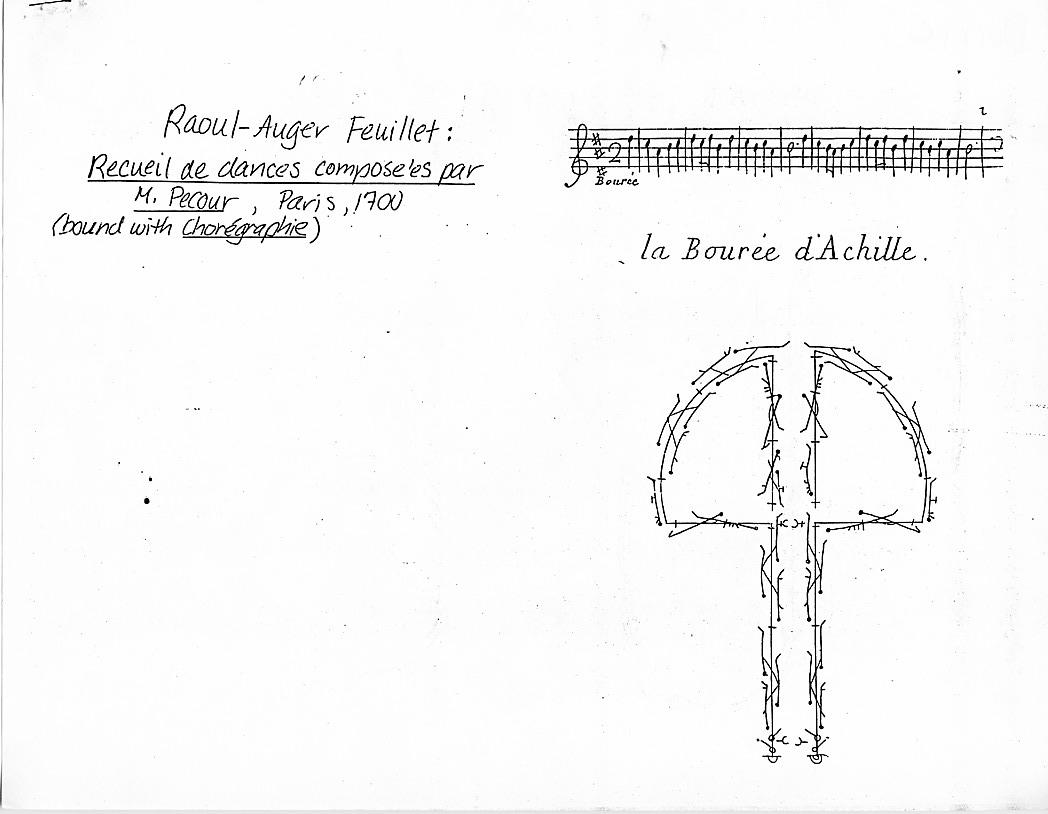
First eight bars of a dance recorded and published by Feuillet in 1700. The roles of the two dancers, the tract they were to follow, and the steps to perform are shown, with the melody for these steps shown above.

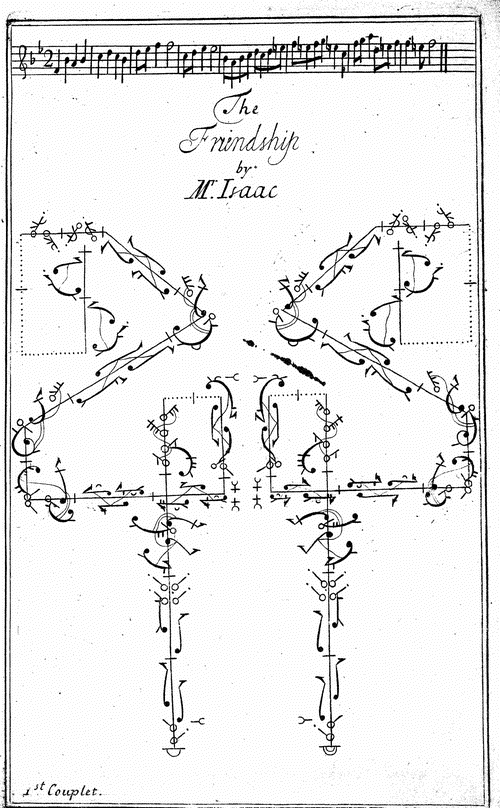
First page of a 1715 ball dance, The Friendship, by the English royal dancing master Mr. Isaac and notated by Mr. Pemberton. It shows the first 16 bars of the dance performed to a repeated 8 bar, duple meter phrase.

This notation system was commissioned by Louis XIV (who had founded the Académie Royale de Danse in 1661), and devised in the 1680s by Pierre Beauchamp, his dancing master. This notation system was first described in detail in 1700 by Raoul-Auger Feuillet in Chorégraphie. Feuillet also then began a programme of publishing complete notated dances. It was used to record dances for the stage and domestic use throughout the eighteenth century, with a modified version proposed by Pierre Rameau in 1725, and surviving into at least the 1780s in various modified forms.

One of the innovations of this notation was to show the music on a staff as a musician would use it, across the top of a page. Bar markings on the music are also drawn across the tract of the dancers, clarifying the relation of the steps to the music. The focus of the notation is the footwork. The notation shows the sequence of foot moves, and, for each move, the direction, the manner of executing the step, and the relative timing of the moves. There is enough detail that dancing masters, in other places and times, could reconstruct the dance and teach it from the notation alone. There are over 300 notated dances known. The majority of the known dances are for two dancers, usually a man and a woman, and were intended to be performed at balls or on the stage.

== Reading ==
- Raoul Auger Feuillet (1700) Chorégraphie, ou l'art de d'écrire la danse (Paris)
  - a facsimile of the 1700 Paris edition (1968: Broude Brothers)
  - translated into English by John Weaver: (1706) Orchesography (London)
  - translated into English by P. Siris: (1706) The Art of Dancing (London)
- Raoul Auger Feuillet (1706) Recueil de contredanses (Paris)
  - a facsimile of the 1706 Paris edition (1968: Broude Brothers)
- Wendy Hilton “Dance of court and theater: the French noble style 1690–1725”
  - reprinted in: (1997) Dance and Music of Court and Theater: Selected Writings of Wendy Hilton (Pendragon Press) ISBN 0-945193-98-X
- Meredith Ellis Little & Carol G. Marsh (1992) La Danse Noble: An Inventory of Dances and Sources (Broude Brothers) ISBN 0-8450-0092-6
- Pierre Rameau (1725) Le Maître à danser (Paris)
  - a facsimile of the 1725 Paris edition (1967: Broude Brothers)
  - translated John Essex: (1728) The Dancing Master (London)
- Pierre Rameau (1725) Abbregé de la nouvelle methode (Paris)
- Kellom Tomlinson (1735) The Art of Dancing (London)
- Gregorio Lambranzi (1716) Neue und Curieuse Theatralische Tantz-Schul (Nürnberg)
- Philippa Waite & Judith Appleby (2003) Beauchamp–Feuillet Notation: A Guide for Beginner and Intermediate Baroque Dance Students (Cardiff:Consort de Danse Baroque) ISBN 0-9544423-0-X
