= Pierre Rameau =

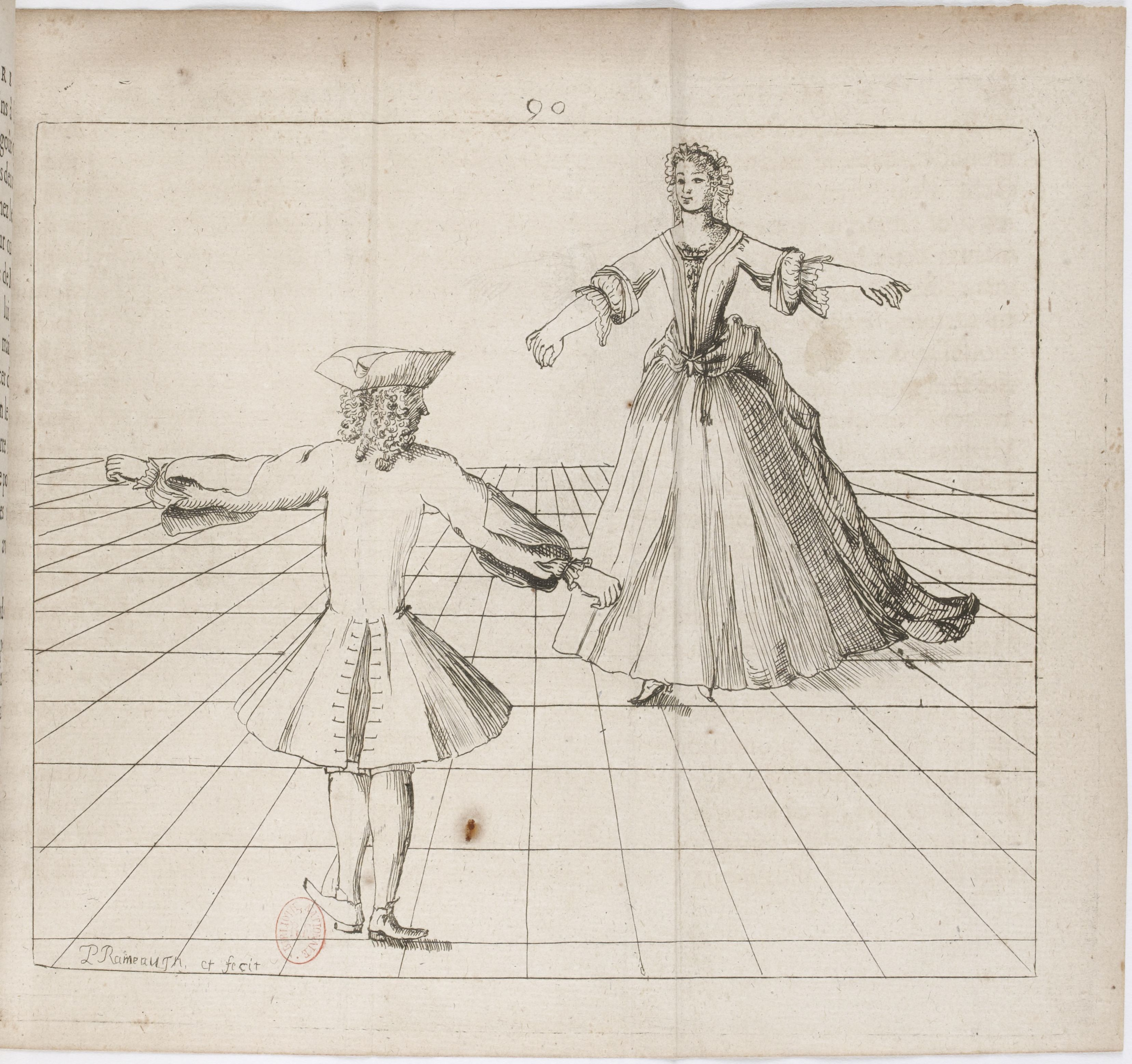
Pierre Rameau, Le Maître à danser, Paris, 1725

Pierre Rameau (1674 – 26 January 1748), was the French dancing master to Elisabetta Farnese, and the author of two books that now provide us with valuable information about Baroque dance.

Rameau's first book, Le Maître à Danser (1725, Paris), was a dance manual giving instruction on formal ballroom dancing in the French style. The first part covers posture, reverences, steps, and the ballroom minuet, while the second part is concerned entirely with the use of the arms. His second book, Abbregé de la Nouvelle Methode (c1725, Paris), described a modified version of Beauchamp–Feuillet notation and included several choreographies by Pécour in the new notation. While Rameau's notation was not generally adopted, his information about the shortcomings of Beauchamp–Feuillet notation provides dance historians with clarifications about the execution of the steps.

== See also ==
- List of dancers
