= John Weaver (dancer) =

English dancer and choreographer (1673–1760)

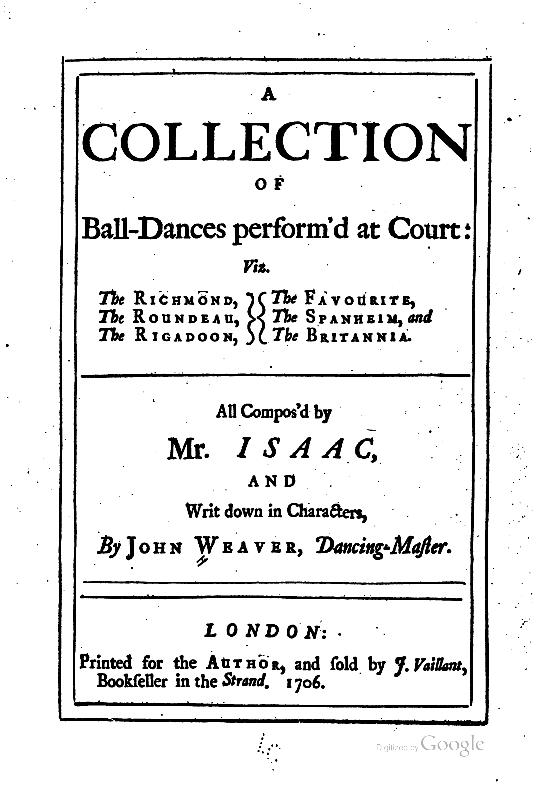
A Collection of Ball-dances Perform'd at Court; all compos'd by Mr. Isaac, and writ down in characters, by John Weaver, dancing-master (1706)

John Weaver (baptised 21 July 1673 – 24 September 1760) is widely regarded as the father of English ballet and of English pantomime.

He was an English dancer, dancing master and choreographer, and producer of a number of works on dancing.

== Early life ==
Weaver was born in Shrewsbury where he was baptised on 21 July 1673 at the parish church of Holy Cross ie Shrewsbury Abbey Church, son of John Weaver, a dance teacher. He was educated at the local Free School.

His father suggested he go to London and become a ballet master. Weaver seems to have left Shrewsbury in 1696 or 1697, although his first recorded performance in London was not until the summer of 1700. Weaver soon became a specialist in comic roles and created the burlesque Tavern Bilkers (1702).

By the early 1700s, Weaver was part of a circle of dancing masters who were eager to promote the new French system of dance notation. Weaver translated Feuillet’s Choregraphie (Paris, 1700) into English as Orchesography (London, 1706), to make the treatise more widely accessible. He also notated a collection of six ball dances by Queen Anne’s dancing master Mr Isaac and in 1707 added The Union, created to celebrate not only the Queen's birthday but also the Act of Union between England and Scotland. He must have met Hester Santlow around this time, for she performed The Union before the Queen with the French dancer Desbarques. Weaver left London and returned to Shrewsbury in late 1707 or early 1708.

In Shrewsbury, Weaver embarked on a book of his own. In An Essay towards an History of Dancing, published in London in 1712, he admiringly recounts the achievements of the dancers – the mimes and pantomimes – of classical antiquity. He also appraises the stage dancing of his own time, setting down his ideas for its reform. Weaver wanted dancing to have the status of an art so that it could be a worthy rival to drama. He would realise this ambition only when he returned to London in 1717 and created The Loves of Mars and Venus.

== The Loves of Mars and Venus ==
The Loves of Mars and Venus was first performed at Drury Lane theatre on 2 March 1717. It dealt with themes from classical literature and required a significant number of gestures due to the story not being expressed in any spoken form. Because Weaver attempted to use plot and emotion in replacement of more sophisticated technical and speech methods, he is considered a major influence on subsequent choreographers, including Jean-Georges Noverre and Gasparo Angiolini.

== Other writings and productions ==
In addition to the other works of notation mentioned above, he published A Small Treatise of Time and Cadence in Dancing' (1706), another translation of Feuillet. He also published "Anatomical and mechanical lectures upon dancing. Wherein rules and institutions for that art are laid down and demonstrated" (1721). In 1728 he revised sections of his Essay of 1712 for a more popular audience and published it as The History of the Mimes and Pantomimes. He also made a number of contributions to The Spectator, edited by his friend Richard Steele, who described him as "that more than Peripatetick Philosopher, Mr Weaver".

His other theatrical productions included The Shipwreck; or Perseus and Andromeda (1717), a "Burlesque Entertainment in Dancing", Orpheus and Eurydice (1718), a "Dramatick Entertainment in Dancing" and The Judgment of Paris (1733), a "Dramatick Entertainment in Dancing and Singing".

== Personal life ==
Weaver was twice married. By his first wife, Catherine, who died in 1712, he had two sons and one daughter. His second wife, Susannah, survived him to die in 1773 aged 73.

== Later life ==
Subsequent productions were less successful and by 1721 his attention had shifted to the scientific treatment of his art, trying to establish dancing as one of the liberal arts. In 1720 he moved his family back to Shrewsbury, but returned to Drury Lane in 1728–29 as a producer and dancer. After this, apart from the production of The Judgment of Paris in 1733, he left the stage. Back in Shrewsbury he devoted himself to his boarding school, and is thought to have taught dancing to almost the end of his long life. He died on 24 September 1760, aged 87. He was buried in the south aisle of Old St Chad's Church, Shrewsbury, on 28 September.

== Celebration ==
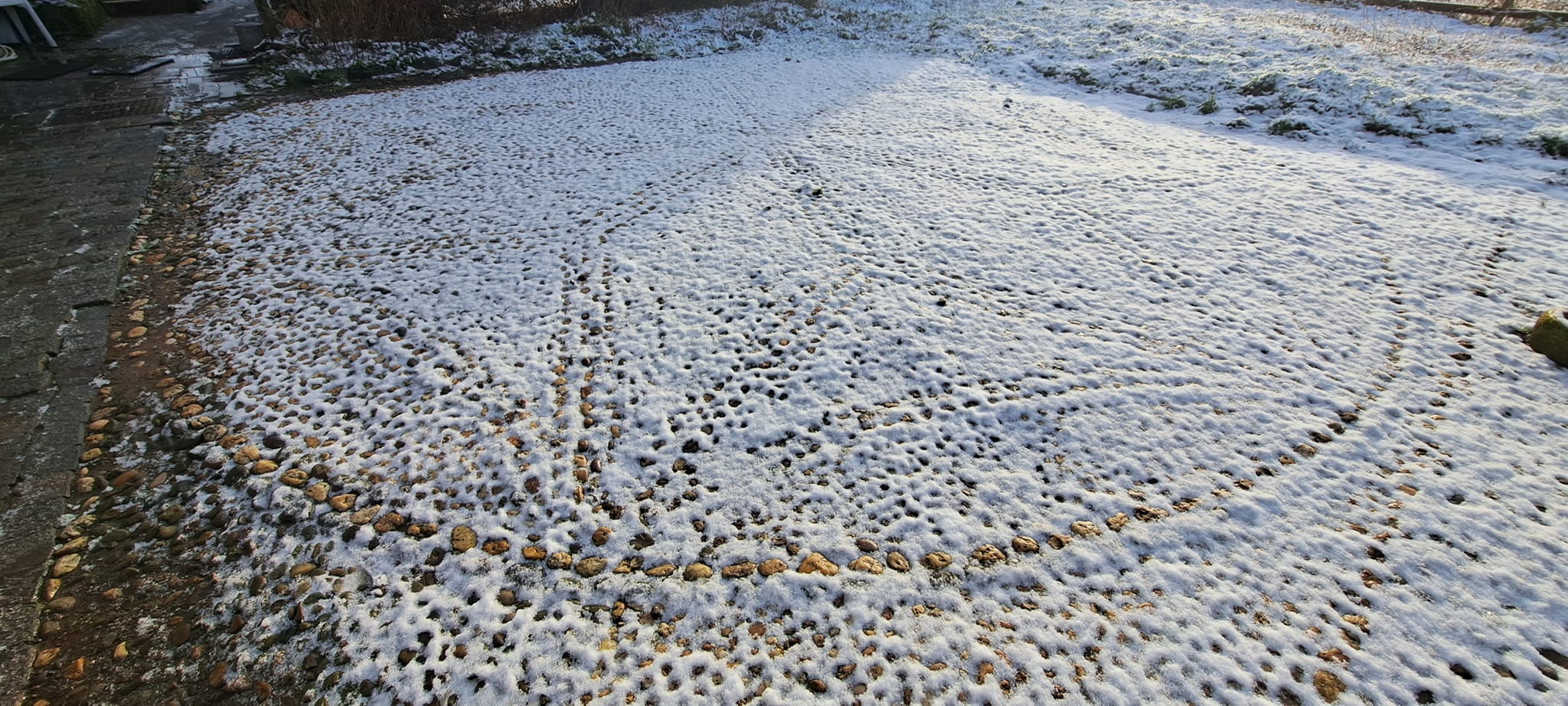
The Soulton Hall dancing pavement

The inaugural John Weaver Dance Festival, marking the 350 year anniversary of this birth was held March 17th - 19th, 2023, and included a dance showcase, lecture and exhibition. Many of the events were hosted by Shrewsbury School and material from the Soulton Hall collection was loaned concerning its association with dance and early dancing pavement.

== See also ==
- List of dancers
