= Raoul Auger Feuillet =

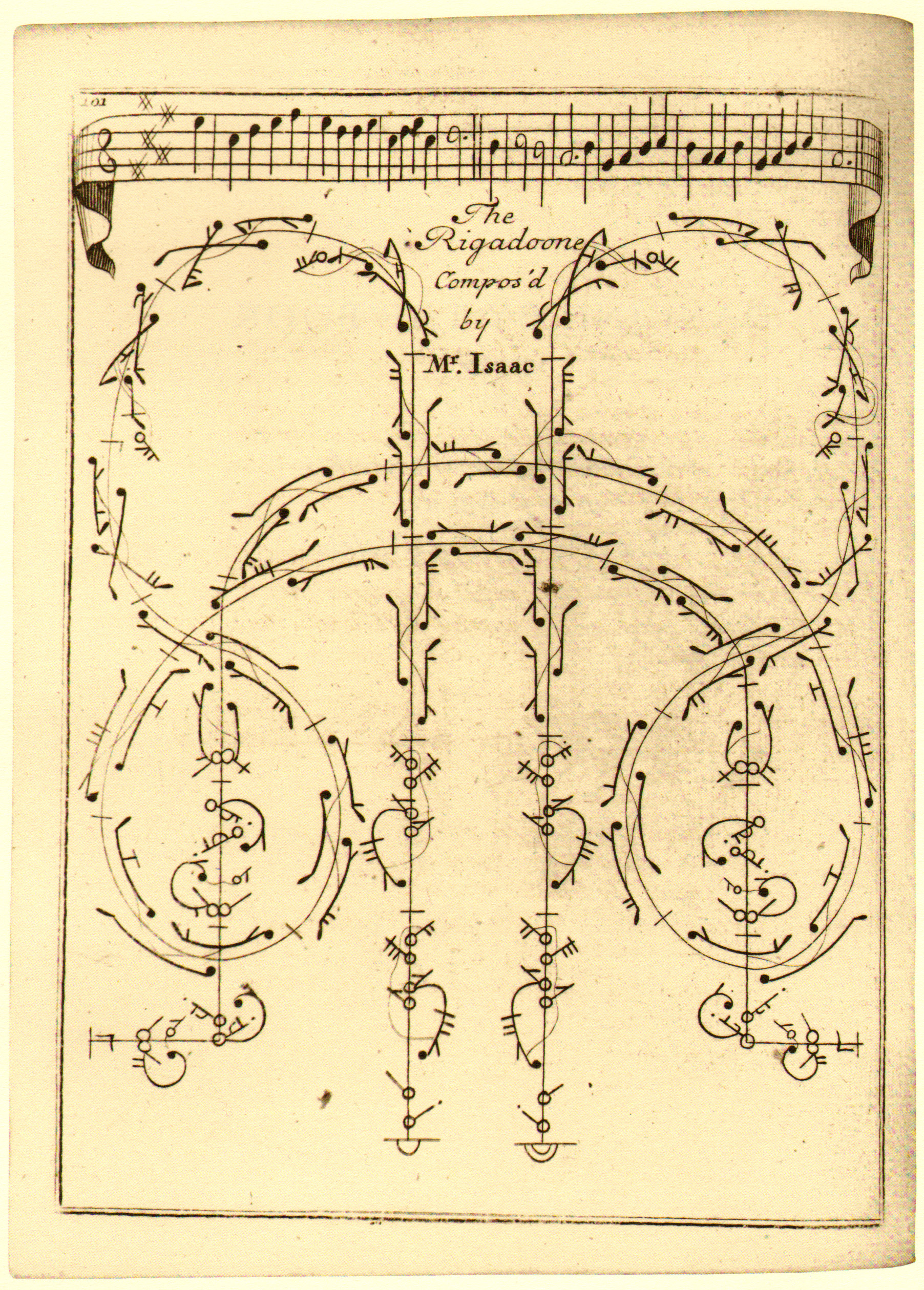
Feuillet's dance notation for a rigadoon by Isaac, first published in Orchesography or the Art of Dancing ... an Exact and Just Translation from the French of Monsieur Feuillet. By John Weaver, Dancing Master. Second edition. London, ca. 1721.

Raoul Auger (or Anger) Feuillet (c.1660–1710) was a French dance notator, publisher and choreographer most well-known today for his Chorégraphie, ou l'art de décrire la danse (Paris, 1700) which described Beauchamp–Feuillet notation, and his subsequent collections of ballroom and theatrical dances, which included his own choreographies as well as those of Pécour.

His Chorégraphie (1700) was translated into English by John Weaver (as Orchesography. Or the Art of Dancing) (1706) and P. Siris (as The Art of Dancing), both published in 1706. Weaver also translated the Traité de la cadance from Feuillet's 1704 Recŭeil de dances (as A Small Treatise of Time and Cadence in Dancing, 1706). Feuillet's Recŭeil de contredances (1706), a collection of English country dances, was translated into English by John Essex (as For the Furthur Improvement of Dancing, 1710).
