= Ecstatic dance =

Dance leading to a trance and a feeling of ecstasy

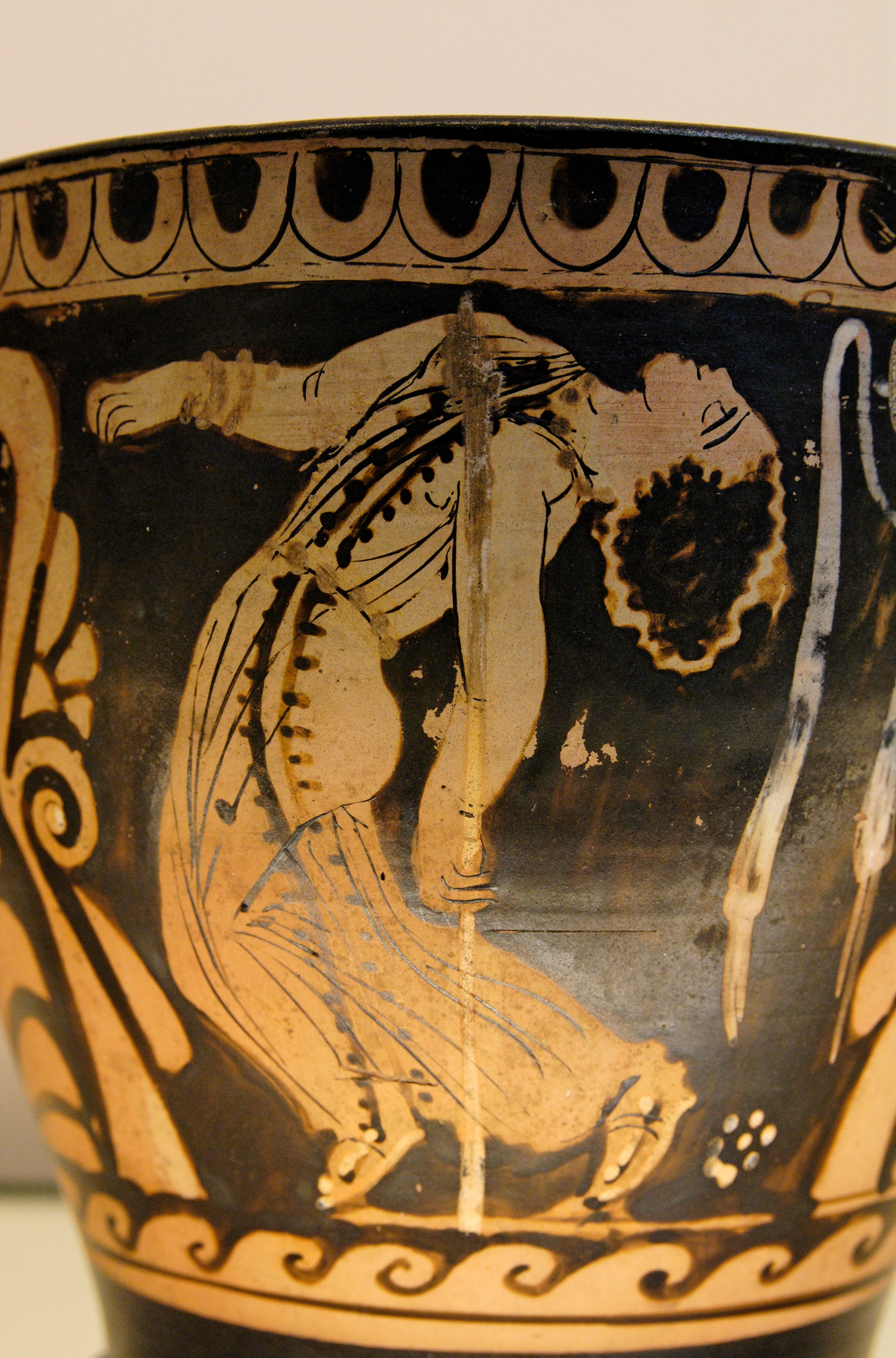
Ecstatically dancing maenad. Detail from a Paestan red-figure skyphos, c. 330–320 BC.

Ecstatic dance is a form of dance in which the dancers, sometimes without the need to follow specific steps, release themselves to the rhythm and move freely as the music takes them, leading to trance and what is said to be a feeling of ecstasy. The effects of ecstatic dance begin with that ecstasy, which is described as being experienced in differing degrees. Dancers are described as feeling connected to others, and to their own emotions. The dance has been described as a form of meditation, sometimes used to help manage stress and to move towards a state of serenity.

In the ancient and widespread practice of shamanism, ecstatic dance and rhythmic drumming are used with the intention of altering consciousness in spiritual practices. Ecstatic sacred dances are known also from religious traditions around the world. Modern ecstatic dance was revived by Gabrielle Roth in the 1970s and formalised in her 5Rhythms practice; it is now found in variants across the western world.

Attitudes to ecstatic dance have varied widely. In the 1920s, musicologists such as Paul Nettl and Fritz Böhme considered it primitive and unrefined. More recently, it has been compared to dancing in raves and in club culture, the anthropologist Michael J. Winkelman and the musicologist Rupert Till finding in these forms elements of ritual, spirituality, and healing. The philosopher Gediminas Karoblis relates early ecstatic dance to religious ritual, stating that all well-executed dance borders on ecstasy.

== Ecstasy ==
Ecstasy (from Ancient Greek ἔκστασις ékstasis, in turn from ἐκ (ek, out) and ἵστημι (hístēmi, I stand) is a subjective experience of total involvement of the subject, with an object of his or her awareness. In classical Greek literature it meant the removal of the mind or body "from its normal place of function."

The primary effect of ecstatic dance, as for instance in sacred dance, is intended to be ecstasy. The religious historian Mircea Eliade stated that shamans use dance, repetitive music, fasting, and hallucinogenic drugs to induce ecstasy. The ethnologist Maria-Gabriela Wosien identified four degrees of ecstasy that dancers may experience: "the warning, the whisper of inspiration, the prophecy, and finally the gift, the highest grade of inspiration."

The described effects of ecstatic dance include a feeling of connection with others, and with the dancer's own emotions; serving as a meditation, providing a way of coping with stress and restoring serenity; and serving as a spiritual practice. A psychological study has described it as "generating experiences of flow states, play, creativity, belonging and community". Lisa Fasullo of the Center for Transformative Movement in Boulder, Colorado and colleagues present ecstatic states as "accessible and like traditional meditative states – specifically yoga – as observable, identifiable, discernible, able to be sensed and experienced", and ecstatic dance as "an effective method of attaining these elevated and energized experiences, and ... of generating inner well-being". Roth identified specific emotions associated with the five different rhythms of ecstatic dance that she used, namely that she intended the flowing rhythm to connect the dancer with their own fear; the staccato rhythm with anger; chaos with sadness; lyrical with joy; and stillness with compassion.

== Ancient ==
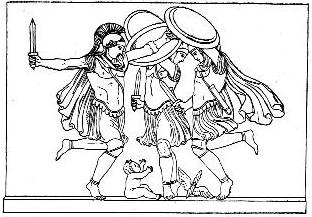
The ecstatic Kouretes dancing around the infant Zeus, depicted by Jane Ellen Harrison, 1912

Little is known directly of ecstatic dance in ancient times. However, Greek mythology tells several stories of the Maenads; the maenads were intoxicated female worshippers of the Greek god of wine, Dionysus, known for their "ecstatic revelations and frenzied dancing". The mythical female followers of Dionysus, including bacchants and thyiads as well as maenads, were said to have sought the "wild delirium" of possession by the god so they could "get out of themselves", which was called "ekstasis". The male counterparts of the Maenads were the Korybantes (Ancient Greek: Κορύβαντες), armed and crested ecstatic dancers who worshipped the Phrygian goddess Cybele with drumming and dancing. They were the offspring of the muse Thalia and the god Apollo. The Greeks often confused them with other ecstatic male confraternities, such as the Idaean Dactyls (Ancient Greek: Δάκτυλοι Ἰδαῖοι) or the Cretan Kouretes (Κουρῆτες), spirit-youths (kouroi) with magical powers who acted as guardians of the infant Zeus.

The myths gave rise to ancient Greek practices in honour of Dionysus. The oreibasia ("mountain dancing") was a midwinter Dionysian rite practised by women, and said to be originally an "unrestrained, ecstatic dance where the 'human' personality was temporarily replaced by another", though it eventually became structured into a definite ritual.

The theologian W. O. E. Oesterley argued that Old Testament passages such as 1 Kings 18:26, "They [The prophets of Baal] limped about the altar they had made", and 1 Kings 18:21, "How long will ye limp upon two legs?" describe a kind of ecstatic dance used for pagan worship in which the knees were bent, one after the other, to give a kind of limping step repeated for each leg. He notes that the dance increased "to an orgiastic frenzy", as by 1 Kings 18:28 the dancers are crying aloud and cutting themselves "with knives and lances". He suggests that this might have been intended to awaken the god's pity and hence answer the people's prayers. Oesterley compares this to Apuleius's account in his 2nd century The Golden Ass 8:27–28 of the ecstatic dance of the priests of the Syrian goddess, in which "they began to howl all out of tune and hurl themselves hither and thither as though they were mad. They made a thousand gest[ure]s with their feet and their heads; they would bend down their necks, and spin round so that their hair flew out at a circle; they would bite their own flesh; finally, everyone took his two-edged weapon and wounded his arms in divers[e] places."

Oesterley noted that Heliodorus of Emesa recorded in his 3rd century Aethiopica 4:16ff that sailors from Tyre performed a dance worshipping their god Herakles, to the "quick music" of flutes, hopping, jumping up, "limping along on the ground, and then turning with the whole body, spinning around like men possessed."

== Traditions ==
A variety of religions and other traditions, founded at different times but still practised around the world today, make use of ecstatic dance.

Map of ecstatic dance across the world. Some dance forms have spread widely or, like Shamanism, are found in different forms across the world.

Tradition	Countries	Description	Start
Rudra-Shiva	India	In Hindu mythology, the Rig Veda tells of the Maruts, the wild but playful companions of the god Rudra-Shiva. The god's human followers may identify with and imitate the god's companions, just as happened in ancient Greece with the followers of Dionysos and the Korybantes.	Ancient
Shamanism	Worldwide	Uses drumming, rhythm, and ecstatic dance to alter consciousness in spiritual practices, hence magical rather than purely ecstatic.	Ancient
Anastenaria	N. Greece, S. Bulgaria	In the annual celebrations for Saint Constantine and Saint Helen, dancers perform the Anastenaria, a fire-walking ritual, as the climax of three days of processions, music, dancing, and animal sacrifice.	Ancient or medieval
Sufi whirling	Islamic world	In the tradition of the Mevlevi Order founded by Rumi, ecstatic Sufi whirling is practised by devotees as active meditation within the Sama (worship ceremony). In 2007, ecstatic dance was a focus for political resistance in Iran, reportedly "demoniz[ed]" by Shi'a clerics.	12th century
Santeria	Latin America	A syncretized form of African dance of Yoruba religion, Fon of Benin, and Congolese traditions	16th century
Candomblé	Brazil	Afro-American religious tradition practiced mainly in Brazil; makes use of music and ecstatic dance in which worshippers become possessed by their own tutelary deities, Orishas.	Early 19th century
Balinese ritual dance	Bali, Indonesia	The anthropologists Gregory Bateson and Margaret Mead filmed Trance and Dance in Bali in the late 1930s, recording the use of trance in Balinese ritual dance, but also influencing what they observed, for example introducing the use of women dancers in the kris-dance in 1937. The dance climaxes with the women dancing ecstatically, stabbing themselves with their razor-sharp kris daggers, and coming to no harm.	1930s
Modern witchcraft	Western world	Modern witchcraft traditions such as the Reclaiming Tradition and the Feri Tradition define themselves as "ecstatic traditions", and focus on reaching ecstatic states in their rituals, which incorporate dance with other techniques.	1960s
Caribbean Shaktism	Indo-Caribbeans	Madrasi Tamil immigrants from south India brought with them ritual worship of the goddess Mariamma, based on ecstatic dance to drumming on the tappu. Since the 1970s Kali worship has taken the form of "ecstatic healing ceremonies of spirit possession".	1970s

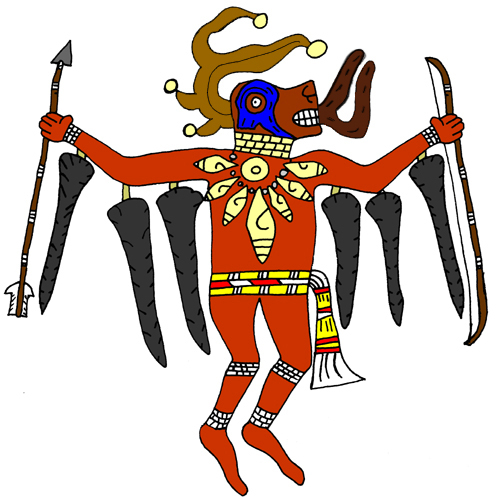
Shamanism, America

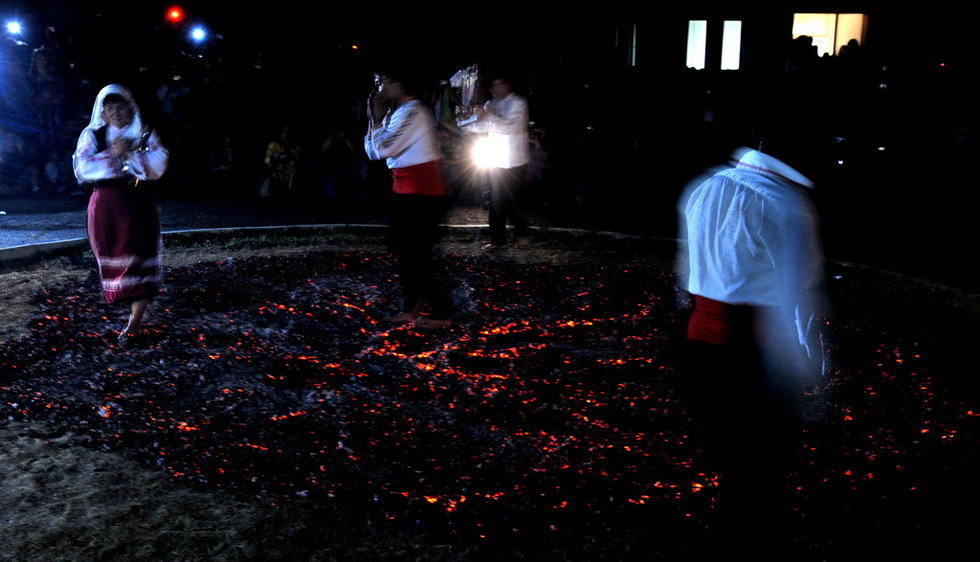
Anastenaria, Bulgaria

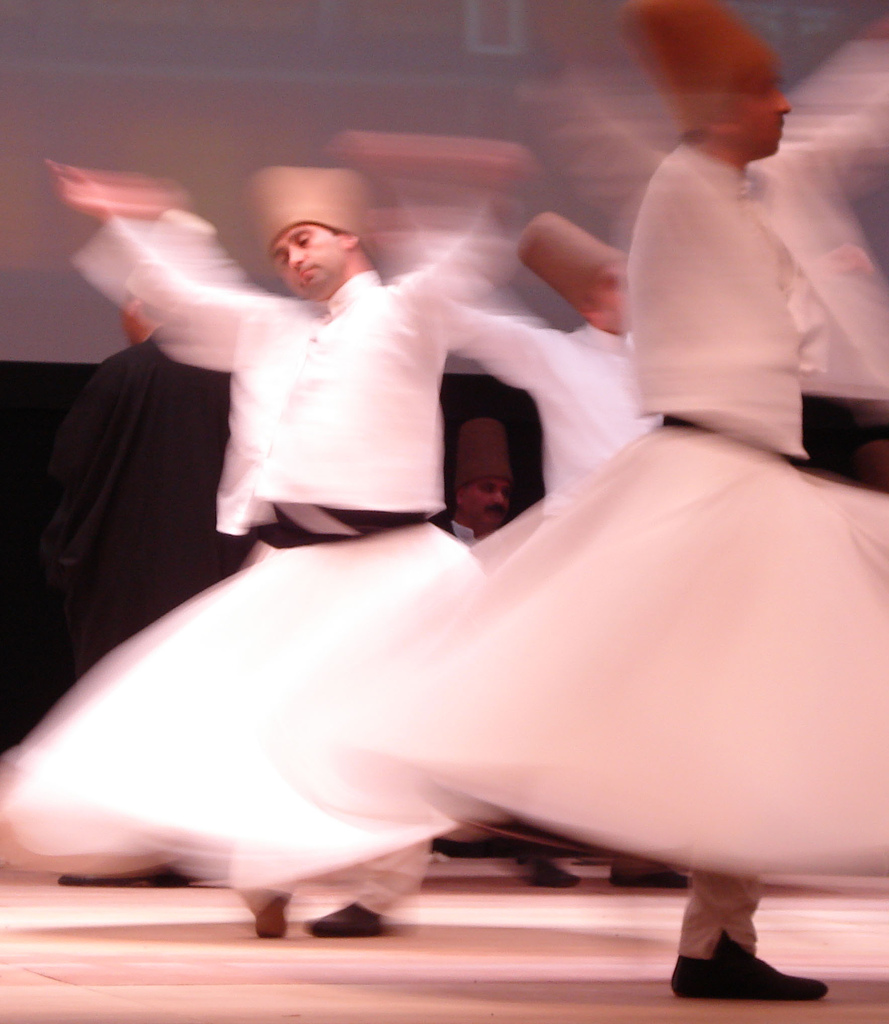
Sufis, Turkey

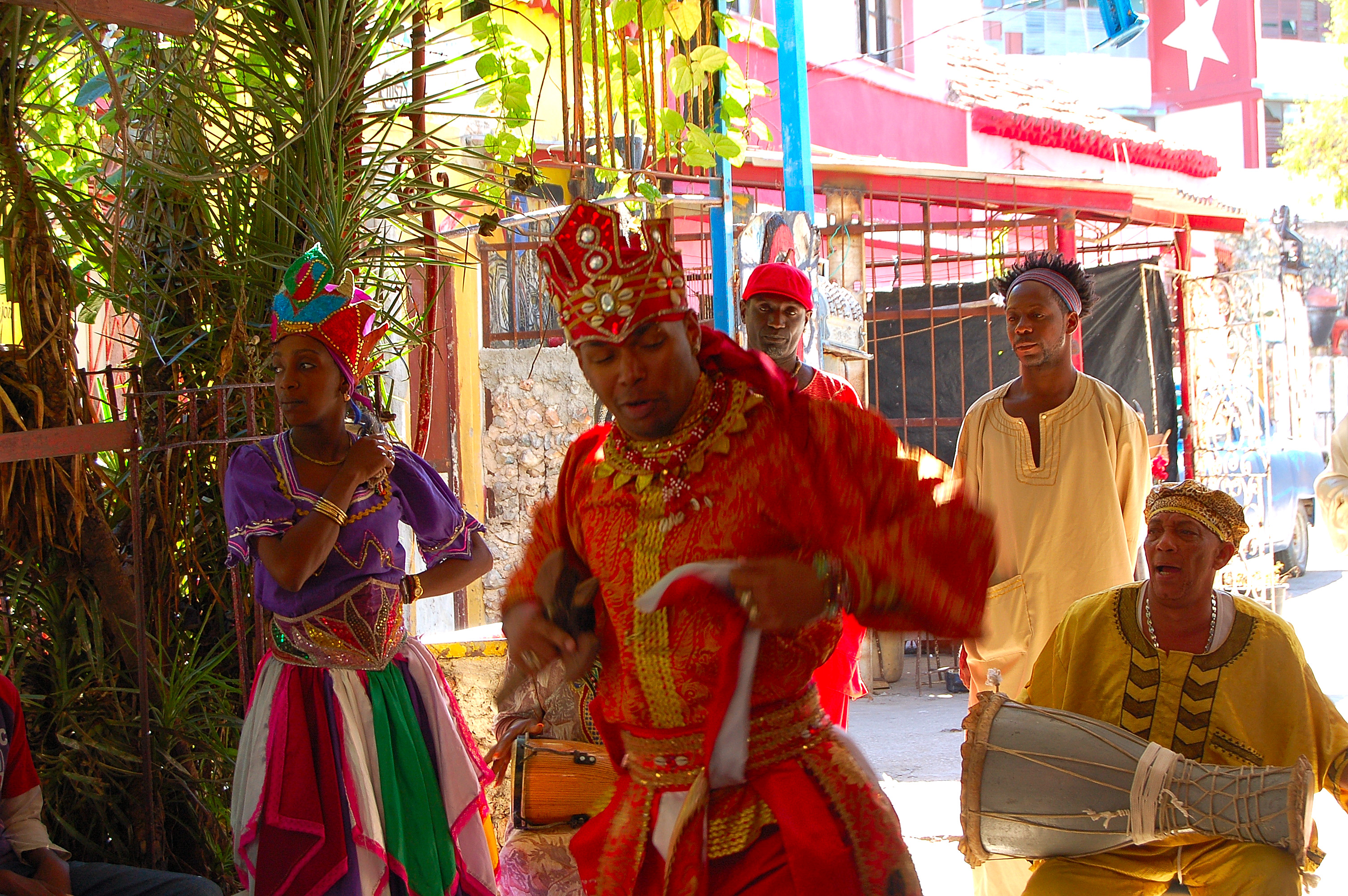
Santeria, Cuba

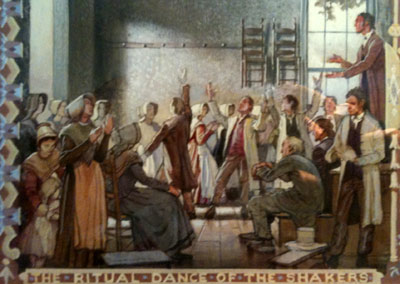
Shakers, America

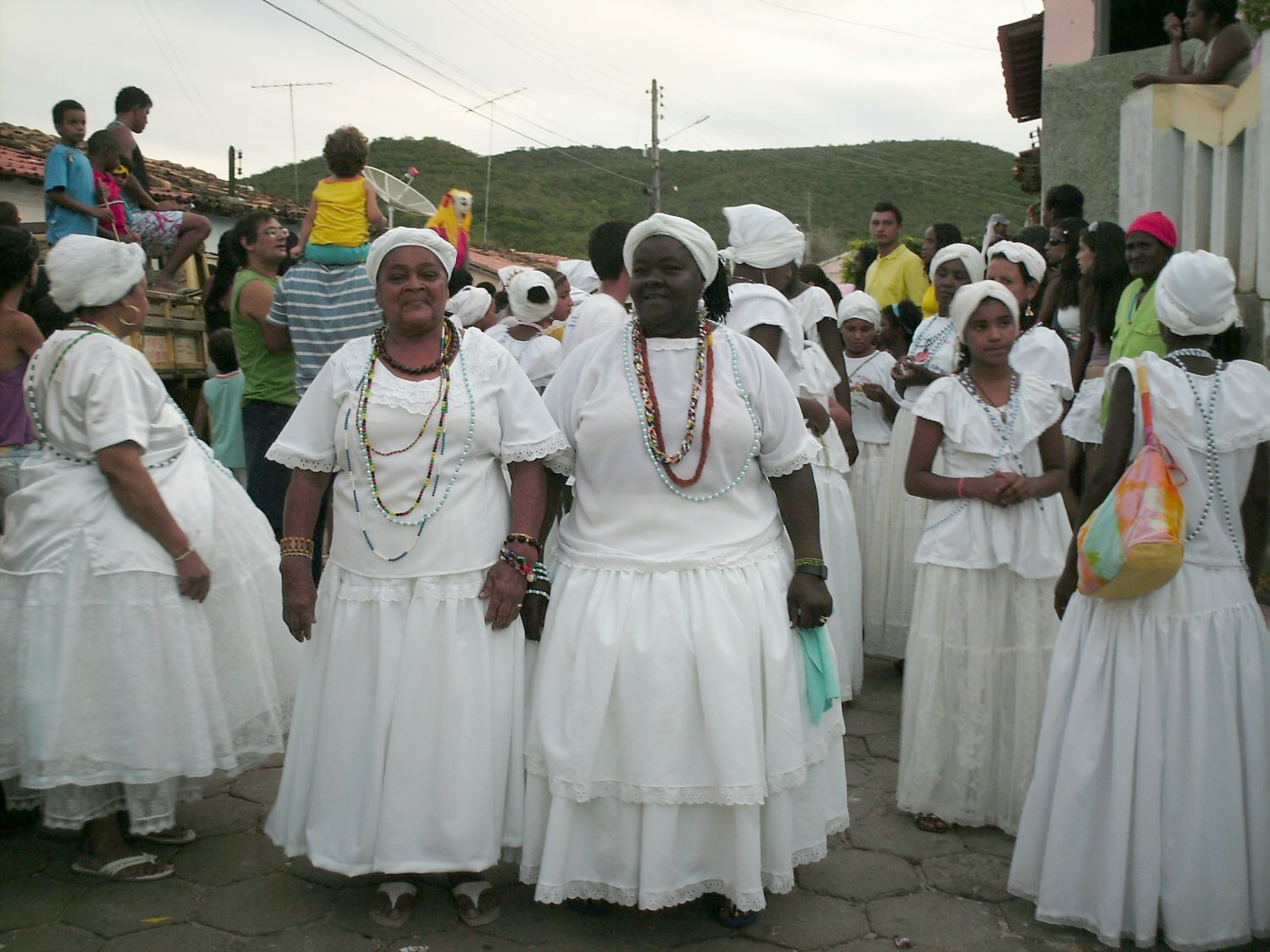
Candomblé, Brazil

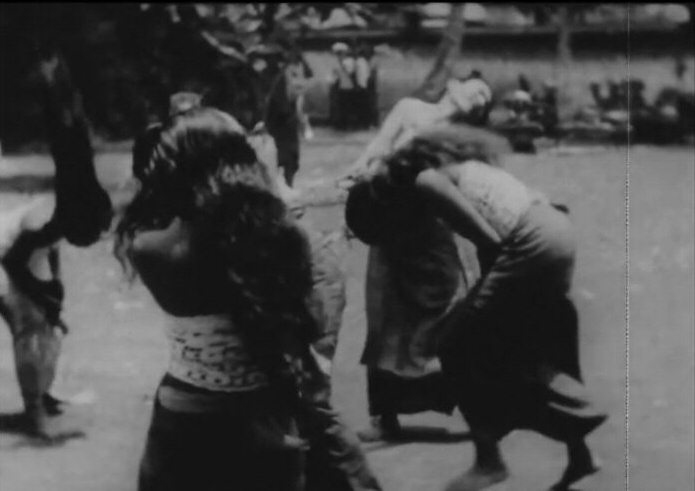
Kris dance, Bali

== Modern ==
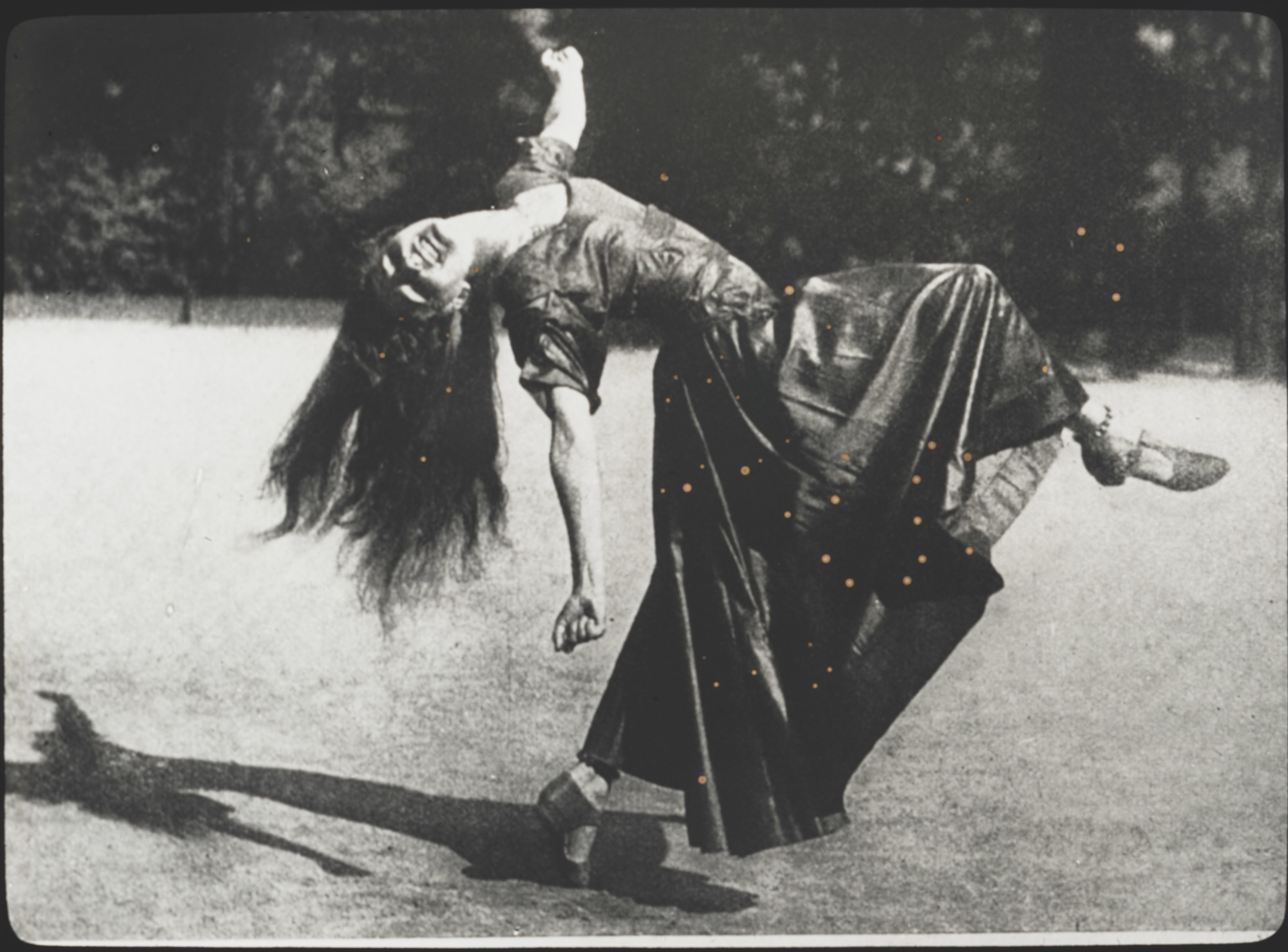
Grete Wiesenthal's ecstatic Danube waltzes, 1908, photographed by Arnold Genthe

Early in the 20th century, the Austrian dancer Grete Wiesenthal turned the formal Viennese Waltz into an ecstatically danced performance with "swirling, euphoric movement and suspended arches of the body", the dancers "with unbound hair and swinging dresses".

Modern ecstatic dance is a style of dance improvisation with little or no formal structure or steps to follow or any particular way to dance. Modern ecstatic dance has developed alongside Western interest in tantra; the two are sometimes combined, and ecstatic dance often plays a part in tantra workshops.

The dancer and musician Gabrielle Roth brought the term "Ecstatic Dance" back into current usage in the 1970s at the Esalen Institute with her dance format called 5Rhythms. This consists of five sections, each accompanied by music with a different rhythm, together constituting a "Wave". The five rhythms (in order) are Flowing, Staccato, Chaos, Lyrical and Stillness. The form strongly expects dancers to shape a distinct movement style consistent with each of the five rhythms, which in practice is unlike other contemporary ecstatic dance as these rhythms often look similar between dancers, but has few other rules. The dance music set is carefully arranged, as documented in Roth's 1989 book Maps to Ecstasy and a set of three DVDs.

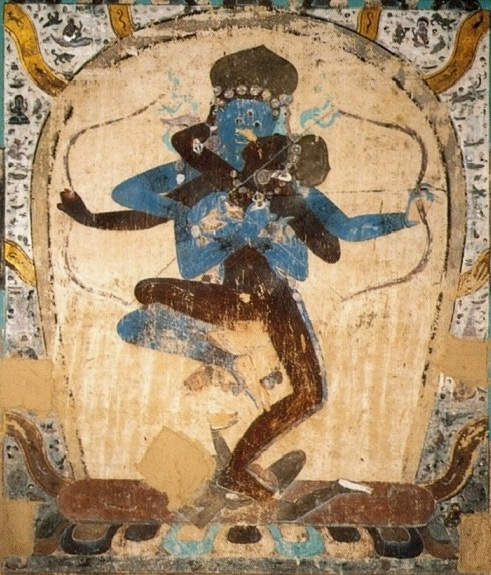
Ecstatic tantric union, Yuan dynasty, 14th century. Modern ecstatic dance sometimes incorporates elements of tantra.

My eyes scan the dancing bodies but keep returning to a young man. He's been gliding along the surface doing his standard repertoire of flowing moves, when suddenly something shifts inside of him. He transcends his boredom and enters the body of a panther on Rollerblades. Moves spin out from his center in endless waves, some breathtaking to watch. He disappears in the dance until all that's left of him is a mop of bleached-white hair... He dissolves in a swirl of arms, in the sweep of a leg, in the curve of his neck. ... he surrenders his bones to the waves and dances in the ocean of his being.

Many different formats have developed since the 1970s, often spun off from Roth's 5Rhythms. After being taught by Roth in 1989, Susannah and Ya'Acov Darling-Khan founded the Moving Centre School in Britain in 1989, teaching the 5 rhythms across Europe. In the early 1990s, "Barefoot Boogie" in San Francisco offered twice weekly drug and alcohol free dance event very similar in form to contemporary ecstatic dance, without the name. In 2006, having met shamans in the Amazon, the Darling-Khans started their own ecstatic dance form, Movement Medicine. The science and environment journalist Christine Ottery, writing for The Guardian in 2011, suggested that "ecstatic dancing has an image problem" but that it "encompasses everything from large global movements such as 5Rhythms and Biodanza to local drum'n'dance meet-ups". Reviewing her experience of 5Rhythms, she suggested that readers may "find 5 Rhythms a good place to start" with ecstatic dance.

Other styles have developed in North America, too, including the Ecstatic Dance Community founded in 2000 by Bodhi Tara at Kalani Honua in Puna on the Big Island of Hawaii who then passed it on to DJ Max Fathom and influenced by Carol Marashi's 1994 Body Choir in Austin, Texas. Sydney 'Samadhi' Strahan founded Ecstatic Dance Evolution in Houston in 2003, while the Tribal Dance Community of Julia Ray opened in Toronto in 2006; it was renamed Ecstatic Dance Toronto in 2010. A more influential event program of ecstatic dance, simply named Ecstatic Dance, was founded in 2008 by Tyler Blank and Donna Carroll and held at Sweet's Ballroom in Oakland, California. By 2018, the Ecstatic Dance Community Foundation listed over 80 places that offered "organized, spontaneous dance practices".

== Reception ==
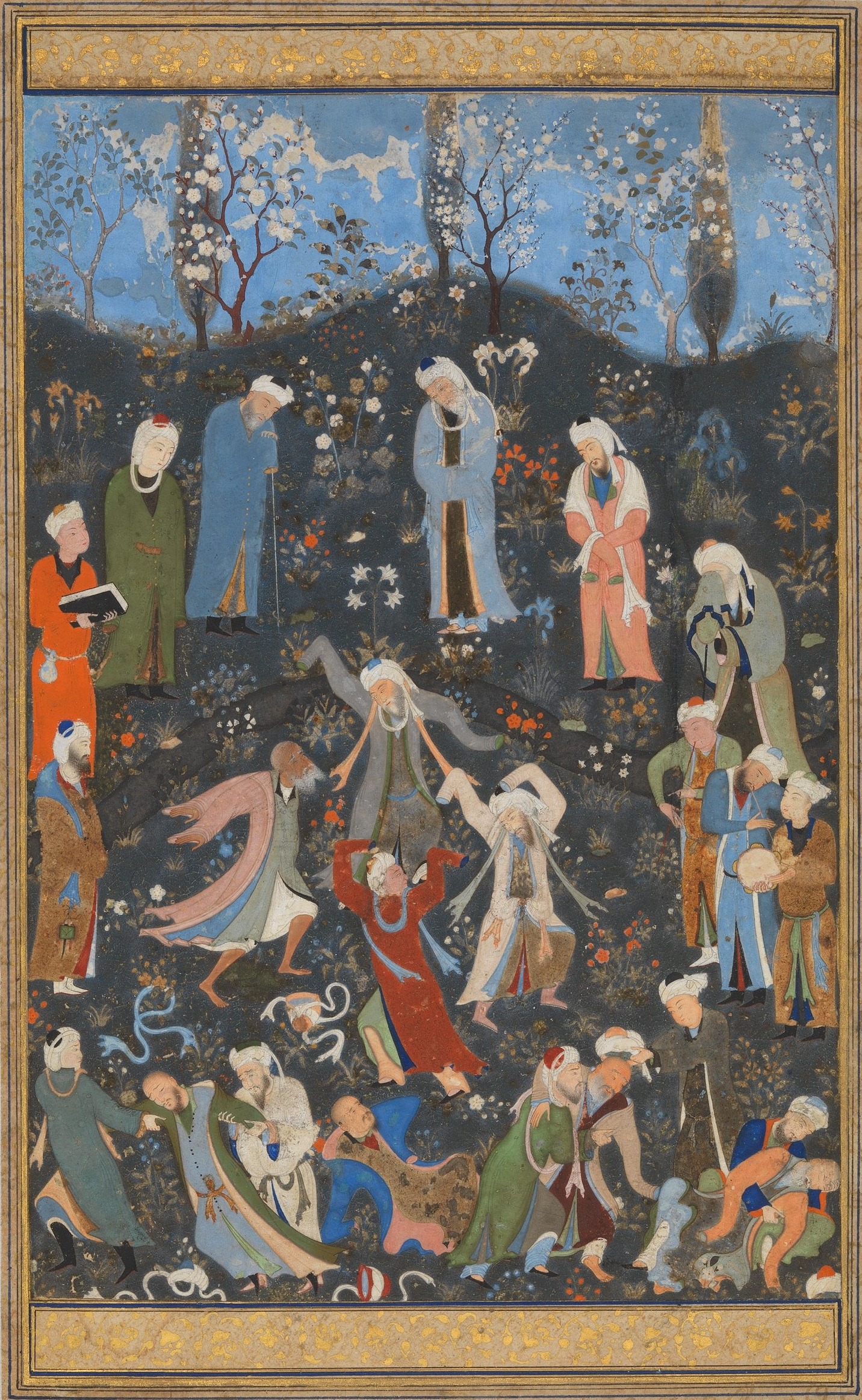
The musicologist Paul Nettl argued that the ecstatic dance of the Sufis and others was "primitive". Painting by Kamāl ud-Dīn Behzād (c. 1485).

=== 20th century attitudes ===
The musicologist Paul Nettl, writing in 1929, granted that ecstatic dance had emotional power "expressive of some psychic exaltation, some intensified emotion", and that the "ordered rhythm" on which it was based was hypnotic, inducing a meditative state and the "dissolution of consciousness", but argued that it was a "primitive" form of dance, a precursor to "higher", more structured dance forms. Nettl added that ecstatic dance was both religious and erotic, giving examples from ancient Greece, medieval Christianity and Sufism. In his 1926 Tanzkunst ("Art of Dance"), the dance theorist Fritz Böhme similarly asserted, without giving examples, that ecstatic dance lacked "artistic refinement", being limited to "a natural, organically grown expression."

=== Philosophy ===
According to philosopher Gediminas Karoblis, in early cultures, ecstatic dance was linked to religious ritual, releasing the dancer from the egocentric self, undoing self-consciousness and connecting to the absolute. In Karoblis's view, trance dances can be either ecstatic or magical. He considers that the trance of the whirling dervishes is genuinely ecstatic as it glorifies God, whereas shamanistic dance is not, being instead magical, as it is intended to induce effects in the world. Karoblis notes that all dance borders on ecstasy, as the catharsis that it produces, if good, cannot be controlled or "technically calculated", yet dancers depend upon it.

=== Psychology ===
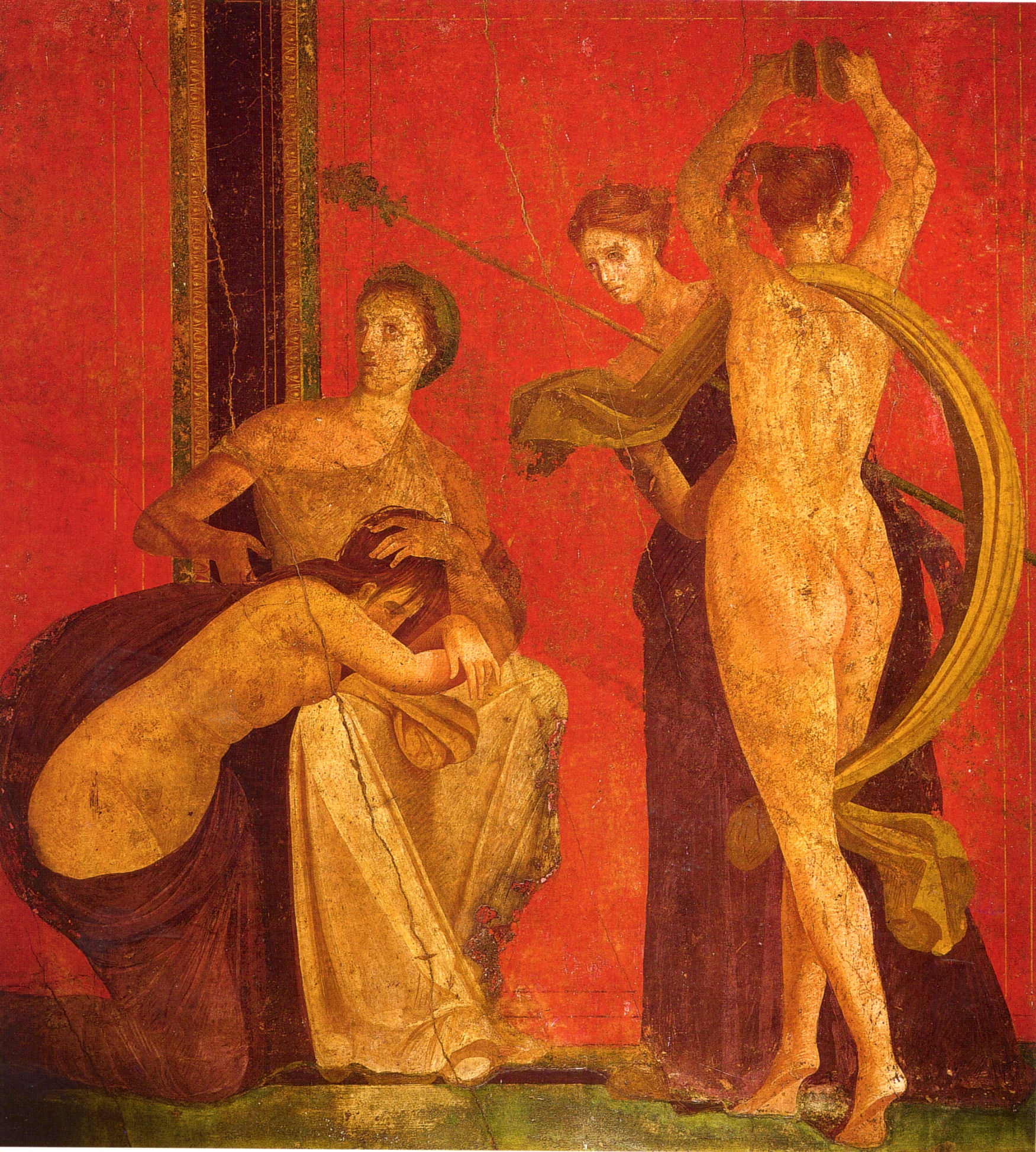
The psychoanalyst Mary Jo Spencer wrote of Pompeii's Villa of Mysteries Maenad: "She does not dance in ecstasy; she is the dance."

The psychoanalyst Mary Jo Spencer used the image of the ecstatic dancer (a Maenad) depicted in the Villa of Mysteries, Pompeii when explaining the appearance of the dance as a symbol for the psyche. She described in the fresco "a nude woman with a flowing scarf turning in a contained but ecstatic dance, much like the description of the dervishes: she does not dance in ecstasy; she is the dance". This was in the context of a client who presented a continuing "motif" of dance, which appeared whenever "a major shift in attitude" was imminent.

=== Mindfulness ===
The nursing researcher Yaowarat Matchim and colleagues write that while mindfulness meditation arose in Buddhism, practices that provoke mindfulness are found in wisdom traditions around the world; such practices include ecstatic dance as well as yoga, prayer, music, and art.

=== Parallels ===
The anthropologist Michael J. Winkelman suggests that shamanism and modern raves share structures including social ritual and the use of dance and music for bonding, for communication of emotions, and for their effects on consciousness and personal healing.

The musicologist Rupert Till places contemporary club dancing to electronic dance music within the framework of ecstatic dance. He writes that "club culture has elements of religion, spirituality and meaning. Its transgressional nature is partly a reaction to the history of repression of traditions of ecstatic dancing by Christianity, particularly by Puritan and Lutheran traditions." He notes that the scholars of music Nicholas Saunders and Simon Reynolds both discuss electronic dance music culture "in terms of trance rituals and ecstatic states."

=== Documentation ===
In their 2003 documentary Dances of Ecstasy, the filmmakers Michelle Mahrer and Nicole Ma portrayed ecstatic dances from around the world, with traditional dances by the San of the Kalahari desert of Namibia, and by the Yoruba of Nigeria; the modern annual Firedance celebration in the Santa Cruz Mountains, California; by Gabrielle Roth; the whirling Zikr dance of the Sufi dervishes; the Hadra ritual danced by Moroccan women, brought by immigrants from Ghana and Senegal; the modern Rainbow Serpent Festival in Australia; the Candomblé ritual in Brazil, derived from Yoruba, Fon of Benin, and Congolese traditions; and the shamanistic Kut ritual of Korea.

== See also ==
- Authentic Movement
- Sacred dance
