= 5Rhythms =

Method for meditation through movement, since late 1970s

The 5Rhythms logo

5Rhythms is a movement meditation practice devised by Gabrielle Roth in the late 1970s. It draws from Indigenous and world traditions using tenets of shamanistic, ecstatic, mystical and eastern philosophy. It also draws from Gestalt therapy, the human potential movement and transpersonal psychology. Fundamental to the practice is the idea that everything is energy, and moves in waves, patterns and rhythms.

Roth describes the practice as a soul journey, and says that by moving the body, releasing the heart, and freeing the mind, one can connect to the essence of the soul, the source of inspiration in which an individual has unlimited possibility and potential.

== The practice ==
The practice of the 5Rhythms is said by Gabrielle Roth to put the body in motion in order to still the mind. The five rhythms (in order) are Flowing, Staccato, Chaos, Lyrical and Stillness. (Note: USPTO Registration # 4840073 European Union (https://euipo.europa.eu/eSearch/) Registration # 014276281) The 5Rhythms, when danced in sequence, are known as a "Wave." A typical Wave takes about an hour to dance.

Longer workshops may, according to The Dancing Path, explore emotion, the cycle of life, the ego, relationships and spiritual vision.

== The 5Rhythms Maps ==
The work is taught through a series of maps that explore the terrain of the inner and outer worlds of individuals, their relationships to others and the space around them. The maps offer a soul journey by exploring embodiment, emotions, the life cycle, the psyche, and the archetypes. The rhythms offer understanding of people's innate powers – being, loving, knowing, seeing and healing.

The first map, "Waves" teaches embodiment of the five distinct rhythms. To embody the rhythms means to access the deep internal wisdom that human bodies contain. The "Heartbeat" map teaches how people have embodied and how they express the emotions of fear, anger, sadness, joy and compassion; while the "Cycles" map provides insight and understanding about how one has internalized conditioning and relationships throughout the life cycle, specifically in the stages of birth, childhood, puberty, maturity and death. Insight and understanding of the ego is delivered through the psyche map, "Mirrors".

Roth drew a circular "Medicine Mandala" that related each rhythm to an emotion, a stage of life, a way of perceiving, and an aspect of the self.

The elements of Gabrielle Roth's "Medicine Mandala"
| Rhythm | Emotion | Stage of life | Way of perceiving | Aspect of self |
|---|---|---|---|---|
| Flowing | Fear | Birth | Being | Body |
| Staccato | Anger | Childhood | Loving | Heart |
| Chaos | Sadness | Puberty | Knowing | Mind |
| Lyrical | Joy | Maturity | Seeing | Soul |
| Stillness | Compassion | Death | Healing | Spirit |

== Schools and teachers ==
Roth founded The Moving Center in New York in 1977 as a base for her workshops, and to train and develop teachers. 5Rhythms Global was founded in 2013 as the international Institute training 5Rhythms teachers worldwide. The 5Rhythms Teachers Association was founded in 2007 as a professional association serving the continuing education of accredited 5Rhythms teachers. The 5Rhythms movement spread worldwide, and in 2017 there were 396 certified teachers and SpaceHolders in 50+ countries.

5Rhythms teacher training is recognised by the International Conscious Movement Teachers Association (ICMTA), and graduates and teachers in training are eligible for membership in ICMTA.

== Reception ==
Charlotte Macleod, writing in the London Evening Standard in 2009, describes dancing the 5Rhythms as a kind of antidote to life in a large city, and how she was attracted to a dance class by a video of Thom Yorke. The class leaves her "mentally and physically refreshed, and oddly connected to the other dancers." The dance was "a kind of moving meditation" for her.

Christine Ottery, writing in The Guardian in 2011, states that "ecstatic dancing has an image problem" and "encompasses everything from large global movements such as 5Rhythms and Biodanza to local drum'n'dance meet-ups". She suggests that readers may "find 5 Rhythms a good place to start", and does so herself: "Nervously, I stretch and warm my muscles. As the rhythms take off, I shake off my shyness." She dances in different ways, alone or with partners. "My body is expressing itself - it's utter abandonment and a complete high."

Jed Lipinski, writing in The New York Times in 2010, notes that 5Rhythms is suitable for all ages, unlike some other forms of dance and movement. He observes that "At a recent 5Rhythms class ... in Manhattan, more than 100 people were gleefully writhing and leaping to tribal drumming courtesy of Ms. Roth's husband, Robert Ansell... Dancers occasionally released guttural howls, as if exorcising the demons of the workweek."

The Daily Telegraph writes of 5Rhythms in 2007 that "I love it precisely because it isn't based on learned steps. Instead, the idea is to find your own dance by moving your body in whatever way you fancy. For those of us keen to improve our fitness, it can also be an energetic aerobic workout."

== Research ==
Academics working in mental health and other fields are starting to carry out research about the 5Rhythms. The Mental Health Foundation, a UK charity published the 'Dancing for Living Report' describing a group of women's experience of 5Rhythms dance and the effects on their emotional wellbeing. The 5Rhythms have been the subject of PhD theses.

== See also ==
- Authentic Movement
- Ecstatic dance
- Biodanza
- Movement Medicine
- Sacred dance

== Bibliography ==
- Roth, Gabrielle; Loudon, John (1989). Maps to Ecstasy: Teachings of an Urban Shaman. New World Library. ISBN 978-0-931432-52-1.
- Roth, Gabrielle (1997). Sweat Your Prayers: Movement as Spiritual Practice. Tarcher Putnam. ISBN 978-0-87477-959-2.
- Roth, Gabrielle (2004). Connections: The Five Threads of Intuitive Wisdom. Tarcher. ISBN 978-1-58542-327-9.
- Stewart, Iris (2013) [2000]. Sacred woman, sacred dance : awakening spirituality through movement and ritual. Inner Traditions. ISBN 978-1-62055-250-6.
