= Movement Medicine =

Movement Medicine is a movement meditation practice, intended to create an experiential and embodied connectedness with the world. It was developed by Susannah and Ya'Acov Darling Khan, who directed the Moving Centre School Europe, representing Gabrielle Roth and the 5Rhythms in Europe until 2007. Movement Medicine integrates physical, artistic, spiritual, shamanic and therapeutic practices so as to stimulate human creativity, healing and transformation, focussing on the relationship with ourselves, each other, the earth, and the spirit of life. It is non-denominational, aiming to answer the spiritual impulse without the need for dogma or belief. The Movement Medicine practice is meant to give people tools to integrate the freedom and aliveness of the dance into daily life.

Besides 5Rhythms, Movement Medicine is influenced by shamanism, Helen Poynor's "Walk of Life" movement work, and global environmental initiatives such as the "Awakening the Dreamer" Symposium. Although not a social movement in the traditional sense of the word, the practice shows similarities with the Human Potential Movement and the New Age movement, sharing interest in a search for self actualization, empowerment and spiritual transformation.

There is a professional organization of Movement Medicine Teachers and Facilitators, and a Registered Charity which sponsors dancers from different countries to train to teach the practice. Movement Medicine teacher training is recognised by the International Conscious Movement Teachers Association (ICMTA), and graduates and teachers in training are eligible for membership in ICMTA.

== Maps of Movement Medicine ==
Movement Medicine works with 4 different 'maps', which focus on different aspects of life in general and the dance practice in particular. Each map is accompanied by different tools, exercises and practices.

Firstly, the map of the 4 Aristotelian elements, Earth, Fire, Water and Air is foundational to Movement Medicine. According to Ya'Acov and Susannah Darling Khan, these elements provide an opportunity to explore different movement qualities, and provide a language of metaphor to support the practice. Each element is considered to exist both inside and outside the dancer, who connects to them through movement and imagination.

Secondly, "the 5 dimensions of awareness" concern different dimensions of moving between micro and macro, individual, inter-personal and global. These are called "the 5 dimensions of awareness": Self, Relational, Environmental, Ancestral and Divine. The practice supports movement across each of these. According to Ya'Acov Darling Khan, trance is like "discovering that you've got second, third, fourth, and fifth gears of perception when you've been ambling along in first."

The third map, called "the 9 Gateways" provides an orientation in space and time and reflects the following 9 aspects of life, divided into groups of three, called "Journeys": 1 Body, 2 Heart, 3 Mind, 4 Past, 5 Present, 6 Future, 7 Fulfilment 8 Interconnection, 9 Realisation.

The 1st "Journey" covers the first three gateways; Body, Heart and Mind. In Movement Medicine, this is represented as a vertical axis from the feet, through the head upwards, and back down again. The 2nd "Journey" explores the 4th, 5th, and 6th gateways, which are Past, Present and Future, which are said to form an axis through time, with the 'present' represented in the body, connected horizontally to the past (behind) and future (in front). The "3rd Journey", which is visualised as a horizontal connection from side to side, aims to manifest individual qualities, a sense of connection with the culture or community around, and a sense of the realisation of the mystical experience of 'one-ness.'

Finally, the last map reflects the dynamic relationship between yin and yang at the centre and the tree of life which is found in many cultures worldwide. In the tree sits the phoenix, which, as symbol for the power of transformation, seems to reflect the essence of Movement Medicine.

== Research ==
A PhD research describes that Movement Medicine dancers experience fundamental shifts in their personal growth and wellbeing in areas of the body, emotions, mind and spirituality. Participants describe insights regarding personal beliefs and patterns, their relationship to ancestral and family history, and to cultural patterns and mechanisms. Furthermore, participants sometimes experience new awareness regarding the nature of life, oneness, and various other ‘life lessons’. Although the variety of different traditions that inform the practice has been criticized, the mixture of different techniques are united in a coherent structure, which offers people from many different backgrounds useful entry points.

A second PhD research project is still being carried out at Exeter University, which looks at the transformational aspects of Movement Medicine through the lens of leadership studies.

== See also ==
- Shamanism
- Sacred dance
- Gabrielle Roth
- 5Rhythms

== Bibliography ==
- Carey, Caroline (2010). Ms'Guided Angel. Eastborne: My Voice Publishing.
- Darling Khan, Ya'Acov and Susannah (2009). Movement Medicine: How to Awaken, Dance and Live Your Dreams. Hay House. ISBN 978-1-8485-01447
- Kieft, Eline (2013). "Dance, Empowerment and Spirituality. An ethnography of Movement Medicine". Roehampton University. Unpublished PhD Thesis
