= W. O. E. Oesterley =

Personal details
- Born: William Oscar Emil Oesterley; 1866 Calcutta, India
- Died: 1950 (aged 83–84)
- Denomination: Church of England

Rev. William Oscar Emil Oesterley (Calcutta 1866–1950) was a Church of England theologian, and professor of Hebrew and Old Testament at King's College, London, from 1926. His many books span a wide range of topics from Bible commentary and Christian doctrine, Judaism and ancient Israel to more general subjects such as Sacred Dance.

His father Emil was representative of the London-based German firm Ernsthausen and Oesterley in Calcutta, and from 1860 British Consul.

Oesterley was educated at Brighton College, Jesus College, Cambridge (BD, 1902) and Wells Theological College. He was vicar of St Alban's Church, Acton Green, Chiswick in 1923. He was Rector of St. Mary, Aldermary in 1923 and had curacies in Houghton-le-Spring, Co. Durham, St. Botolph's, Colchester, St. Nicholas, Brighton, and Prebendary of St. Paul's, London in 1936.

== Works ==
- The Doctrine of The Last Things: Jewish and Christian (1908)
- The Evolution of The Messianic Idea: A Study In Comparative Religion (1908)
- The First Book of Samuel: The Revised Version. Edited with Introduction and Notes. For the use of schools (1913)
- Books of The Apocrypha: Their Origin Teaching and Contents (1915)
- The Wisdom of Ben Sira (1916)
- Immortality and The Unseen World: A Study In Old Testament Religion (1921)
- Sacred Dance in the Ancient World: a Study in Comparative Folklore (1923) - analysis of history of sacred dance and ecstatic dance
- A History of Israel vol. 2; From 586 B.C.E. to A.D. 135 (1932)
- An Introduction to the Books of the Apocrypha (1935)
- The Gospel Parables In The Light of Their Jewish Background (1936)
- Sacrifices In Ancient Israel: Their Origin, Purposes and Development (1937)
- The Jews and Judaism During the Greek Period (1941)
- Commentary on the Psalms (1939)
- Proverbs (1929)
- Studies In The Greek And Latin Versions Of The Book Of Amos
- A Fresh Approach to the Psalms (1937)
- Ancient Hebrew Poems (1938)
- The Jews and Judaism during The Greek Period: The Background of Christianity (1941)
- Wisdom of Egypt and the Old Testament in the Light of the Newly discovered Teaching of Amen-em-ope
- The General Epistle of James [The Expositor's Greek Testament, vol. 4, ed. W.R. Nicoll] (1910, reprinted in 1960 and 1983)
- Wisdom of Jesus the son of Sirach; or, Ecclesiasticus, Cambridge Bible for Schools and Colleges, 1912.

With the illustrator T. H. Robinson:

- The Jewish Background of Christian Liturgy (1925)
- Introduction to the Books of the Old Testament (1934)

With G. H. Box:

- The Sayings of the Jewish Fathers (Pirke Aboth) (Translation and Commentary) (1919)
- A Short Survey of the Literature of Rabbinical and Mediaeval Judaism (1920)
