= Trance and Dance in Bali =

1952 anthropology film by Gregory Bateson, Margaret Mead

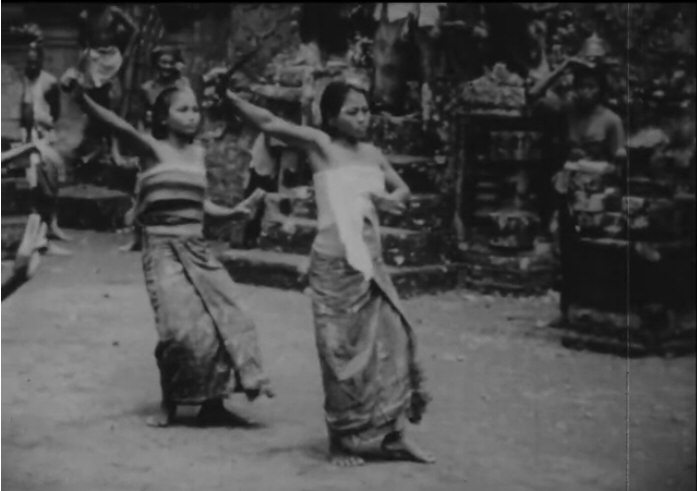
- In trance, the women dancers enter, holding their kris daggers aloft
- Directed by: Margaret Mead and Gregory Bateson
- Distributed by: New York University Film Library
- Release date: 1951

Trance and Dance in Bali is a short documentary film shot by the anthropologists Margaret Mead and Gregory Bateson during their research on Bali in the 1930s. It shows female dancers with sharp kris daggers dancing in trance, eventually stabbing themselves without injury. The film was not released until 1951. It has attracted praise from later anthropologists for its pioneering achievement, and criticism for its focus on the performance, omitting relevant details such as the conversation of the dancers.

== History ==
The anthropologists Margaret Mead and Gregory Bateson visited Bali for two years of research in the 1930s, shooting some 22,000 feet of 16-millimetre film and 25,000 photographs, and completing seven films, of which Trance and Dance in Bali is one. They were married in 1936. Their output of visual materials has been described as unrivalled in anthropology. This was driven by their method of participant observation, which was intended to be recorded in copious systematic field notes so as to grasp the subject's point of view. They paid careful attention to photographic technique, using both still and motion-picture cameras. During their stay, Bateson sent home for additional bulk film, a larger developing tank, and a rapid winder to allow photographs to be taken "in very rapid succession".

The dance for Trance and Dance in Bali was specially arranged during daylight hours, as no lighting equipment was available; the dance was, according to Mead, "ordinarily performed only late at night". Mead later noted that "The man who made the arrangements decided to substitute young beautiful women for the withered old women who performed at night, and we could record how women who had never before been in trance flawlessly replicated the customary behavior they had watched all their lives". In this way, Mead justified the changes as part of their anthropological inquiry.

The film, like Bateson and Mead's other works, initially received a puzzled welcome. The films became classics, launched the field of visual anthropology, and have "landmark status" with little to compare them to. Most of the footage of Trance and Dance in Bali was shot on 16 December 1937 in a performance that they commissioned (on Mead's birthday). They referenced their payment for the performance to Balinese cultural patronage. The trance ritual that they filmed was, according to the anthropologist Ira Jacknis, "not an ancient form, but had been created during the period of their fieldwork", as a Balinese group had in 1936 "combined the Rangda or Witch play (Tjalonarang) with the Barong and kris-dance play, which was then popularized with tourists through the efforts of [the painter] Walter Spies and his friends."

== Synopsis ==
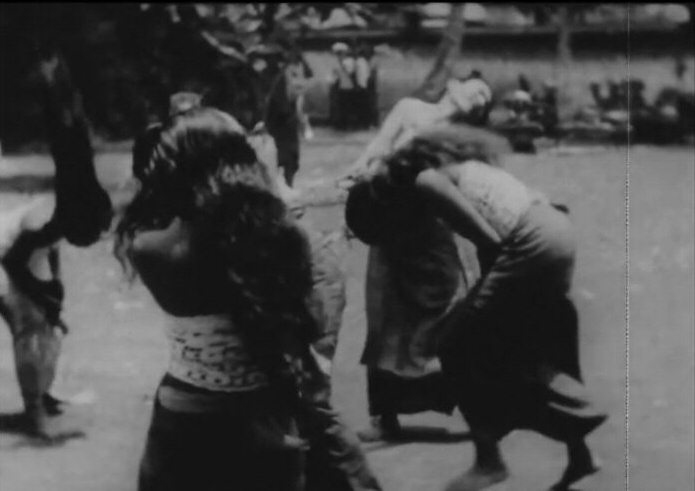
The women dance ecstatically, stabbing themselves with their razor-sharp kris daggers, and coming to no harm.

The film describes and illustrates a single performance of the Kris Dance, a ritual dance on the Indonesian island of Bali. The dance portrays the struggle of good, in the shape of dragons, against evil, in the shape of masked Tjalonarang witches. The dancers are young women. They hold kris daggers. They are seen to enter trance, one at a time, and are revived from it. While in trance, they dance ecstatically and stab themselves with their daggers, remaining unharmed. The film opens and closes with displayed blocks of text, summarizing the dance's story.

No sounds were recorded at the time of filming. The film's soundtrack consists of narration by Mead, and Balinese music recorded elsewhere, possibly by Bateson and Mead's collaborators, the Canadian musicologist Colin McPhee, and the scholar of Balinese dance Katherane Mershon.

== Publication ==
Trance and Dance in Bali was filmed in the 1930s, most of it in 1937, and released in 1951. It is written and narrated by Mead, with cinematography by Bateson, and co-directed by Bateson and Mead. The short film is now available for free download.

== Historical significance ==
Trance and Dance in Bali (22 minutes)

In 1999 the film was deemed "culturally significant" by the United States Library of Congress and selected for preservation in the National Film Registry.

The film was "very influential for its time", according to the anthropologist Jordan Katherine Weynand. She states that it records Balinese people "dancing while going through violent trances, stabbing themselves with daggers without injury. They are then restored to consciousness with holy water and incense."

The Indonesian American anthropologist Fatimah Tobing Rony argues that the "photogenic" violence and trance are untranslatable: anthropology can look at trance but never really penetrates its mystery. In her view, "the naughty voices of the girls and the vain chuckles of the old women, transcribed by the secretary, are never heard in the voiceover or soundtrack: the women become undifferentiated exotic trancers. And the spiritual depths of the older women are not considered." As for objectivity, Rony remarks that "The photogenic Trance and Dance in Bali is representative of a kind of anthropological imperialist blindness, ironic considering that these scientists believed [in] and promoted the idea of their own superior vision".

The anthropologist Hildred Geertz calls the film pioneering, writing that Bateson and Mead are more than pathbreakers: their films "remain in certain crucial respects exemplary achievements." In her view, their films are sophisticated "even by today's standards in that they use film not as ethnographic illustration but as a powerful tool in systematic cultural research." Geertz argues that Trance and Dance in Bali sets out a hypothesis about the interconnectedness of cultural experiences of childhood, ritual, and folk drama. The film is a "minute" sample of Mead's "incredibly large corpus of visual materials", now all archived and annotated. Geertz notes, too, that the film is "a highly dramatic and moving presentation of Balinese culture" that words alone could not achieve, even if the Witch-and-Dragon ritual dance had to be shot in daylight "rather than catching it in all its terrifying mystery" at night.

The visual anthropologist Beverly Seckinger notes that the film created a visual record of one performance of the Kris Dance, with the minimum of written and voiced-over narration. She comments that the film was pioneering in focusing on one ritual, rather than attempting to show a whole "culture" (her quotation marks) in one film; and in limiting the amount of narration. She quotes Geertz's conclusion that "the film remains an evocative and striking presentation of the way in which multiple meanings are condensed within a centrally significant cultural form". Seckinger remarks that all the same the film is "a product of its time", with not attempt to have the participants speak for themselves; she notes that without audio equipment, this would have been difficult. Further, the film treats the dancers as typical of Balinese culture, not as individuals, and there is no Balinese voice or quoted Balinese text. Instead, Mead's narration "inevitably takes on the character of 'scientific' authority".

The hypnotherapists Jay Haley and Madeleine Richeport-Haley describe the film as "a masterpiece of historical importance". They visited Bali around 50 years after Bateson and Mead, met some of the same people, and created a film with the title Dance and Trance of Balinese Children, combining new footage with clips from Trance and Dance in Bali.

The scholar of film Trevor Ponech writes that by altering the customary conditions of performance, Bateson and Mead's objectivity is open to question, perhaps influenced by their "ethically questionable, lifeworld-distorting desires".
