= Gabrielle Roth =

American musician and dancer (1941–2012)

- Born: February 4, 1941; San Francisco, California, U.S.
- Died: October 22, 2012 (aged 71); New York City, U.S.
- Occupations: Dancer, musician, author
- Known for: 5Rhythms, trance dance
- Spouse: Robert Ansell

Gabrielle Roth (February 4, 1941 – October 22, 2012) was an American dancer and musician in the world music and trance dance genres, with a special interest in shamanism. She overcame depression and injury to create the 5Rhythms approach to movement in the late 1970s; there are now hundreds of 5Rhythms teachers worldwide who use her approach in their work. Her vision was to spread dance across the world, using the power of movement to heal body and spirit.

Roth worked at the Kripalu Center for Yoga & Health, at the Esalen Institute, and at the Omega Institute for Holistic Studies. She founded an experimental theatre company in New York, wrote three books, created over twenty albums of trance dance music with her band The Mirrors, and directed or has been the subject of several videos.

== Early life ==
Born in San Francisco on February 4, 1941, Gabrielle Roth described being inspired by the dance of Spanish gypsy La Chunga and by seeing the Nigerian National Ballet. She trained in traditional dance methods, suffering from anorexia during her teenage years. Roth paid for college education by teaching movement in rehabilitation centres. Following college she lived and worked in Europe for three years, during the mid-1960s. During this time she visited the concentration camps memorials in Germany that she had studied during college.

Roth injured her knee in a skiing accident in Germany and again in an African dance class. At 26, she was told that she needed surgery and wouldn't dance again and resigned herself to the prognosis. She became seriously depressed and retreated to Big Sur in California, joining a group at the Esalen Institute. She became a masseuse there, and found that her body healed itself through dance, despite what the doctors had said. Gestalt psychiatrist Fritz Perls asked her to teach dance at the Esalen Institute and she set out to find a structure for dance as a transformative process. Out of her work at Esalen she designed the 'Wave' of the 5Rhythms approach, Flowing, Staccato, Chaos, Lyrical, Stillness.

== Career ==
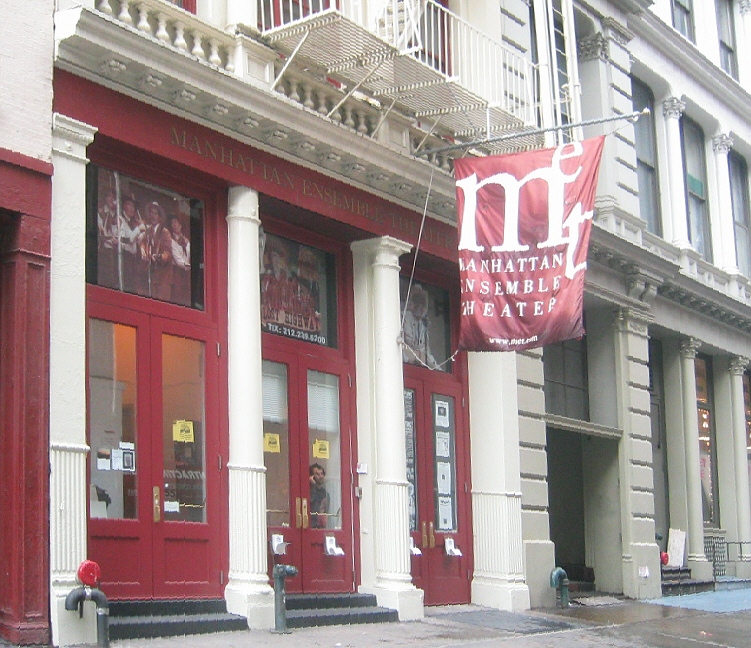
The Culture Project set up home in the Manhattan Ensemble Theatre

Roth was a faculty member at The Kripalu Center for Yoga & Health in Stockbridge, Massachusetts and taught at the Omega Institute for Holistic Studies in Rhinebeck, New York. She trained for three years with Oscar Ichazo, founder of the Arica School and set up her own experimental theatre company in New York City.

She taught experimental theatre in New York based on her ecstatic dance approach, 5Rhythms. Roth was music director of the theatre company The Mirrors and has been a member of the Actors Studio. Roth directed theatre productions of Savage/Love, by Sam Shepard and Joseph Chaikin, at The Culture Project in Mercer Street, New York City. She founded The Moving Center School in 1977 in New York. The Moving Center teaches her work through her school in New York; it had certified over 300 5Rhythms teachers worldwide at the time of her death.

Roth wrote three books: Sweat Your Prayers: Movement as Spiritual Practice, Maps to Ecstasy: Teachings of an Urban Shaman, and Connections: The 5 Threads of Intuitive Wisdom. Sweat Your Prayers begins with an autobiographical prologue, "God, Sex, & My Body", in which she writes of the contradictions in her personality that led her to dance. She comments, "I loved to work out my body but I hated the mirrors". She notes that she was taught by Catholic nuns "with eyes trained to scan for sin" and that her first dance teacher was "an old woman with frizzy dyed red hair, a funny accent, and a long thin stick" who would beat her whenever she made a mistake, initiating in Roth a severe inferiority complex. In college, she became pregnant. She found her lover insensitive to the news and had an abortion three days later. Roth writes that she felt the importance of privacy to her kind of dance while teaching at Esalen in a room "lined with picture windows". Passers by would stare in during sessions. Roth comments, "this was tragic, as the majority of my students were paralytically self-conscious when it came to moving their bodies." She noticed that her students had difficulty breathing. Her book Sweat Your Prayers ends with her vision of spreading dance across the world, the power of movement "leading us back into the garden [of Eden], back to the earth, whole and healed, spirit and flesh reunited".

=== With the Mirrors ===
Roth performed and recorded with her group Gabrielle Roth and the Mirrors, producing over 20 albums. YogaChicago described Roth's album Jhoom as "pure energy and bliss. Intense rhythms". Hot Indie News described Still Chillin as "without question yoga music" that "lends to an ambient, trance-like, meditative state". Awareness Magazine wrote that the music pulsed, "creating a rhythmic aura that transports the listener", in a way that was perfect for yoga.

Roth and the Mirrors provided music for Michelle Mahrer's film, Dances of Ecstasy, in which Roth has an acting credit, appearing as herself. The New York Times review noted that "Whirling Dervishes from Turkey, Orisha Priestesses from Nigeria and Brazil, shaman healers from the Kalahari and dancers in a Gabrielle Roth workshop in New York, pulse to the same beat".

=== 5Rhythms ===
The 5Rhythms movement system, founded by Roth in the late 1970s, focuses on five body rhythms: flowing, staccato, chaos, lyrical and stillness and is according to Jed Lipinski in The New York Times "a way to become conscious through dance". The movement spread worldwide, with 245 registered teachers by 2012. In 2007, Roth founded the non-profit 5Rhythms Reach Out which offered classes in 5Rhythms to various groups, including those suffering from Alzheimer's disease, other dementias, and cancer. The Huffington Post described Roth as "an incredibly influential teacher of meditative dance". Charlotte Macleod, in the London Evening Standard, describes dancing Roth's 5Rhythms as a kind of antidote to life in a large city, and how she was attracted to a dance class by a video of Thom Yorke. The class leaves her "mentally and physically refreshed, and oddly connected to the other dancers." The dance was "a kind of moving meditation" for her. Christine Ottery, in The Guardian, states that "ecstatic dancing has an image problem" and "encompasses everything from large global movements such as 5 Rhythms and Biodanza to local drum'n'dance meet-ups". She suggests that readers may "find 5 Rhythms a good place to start", and does so herself: "Nervously, I stretch and warm my muscles. As the rhythms take off, I shake off my shyness." She dances in different ways, alone or with partners. "My body is expressing itself – it's utter abandonment and a complete high." The 5Rhythms have been the subject of academic study.

== Personal life ==
Roth was married to Robert Ansell. She was diagnosed with stage four lung cancer in 2009 and died on October 22, 2012, aged 71. Roth's son, Jonathan Horan, is director of The Moving Center, and executive director of Roth's international institute, 5Rhythms Global.

== Works ==
=== Books ===
- Roth, Gabrielle; Loudon, John (1989). Maps to Ecstasy: Teachings of an Urban Shaman. New World Library. ISBN 978-0-931432-52-1.
- Roth, Gabrielle (1997). Sweat Your Prayers: Movement as Spiritual Practice. Tarcher Putnam. ISBN 978-0-87477-959-2.
- Roth, Gabrielle (2004). Connections: The Five Threads of Intuitive Wisdom. Tarcher. ISBN 978-1-58542-327-9.

=== Music ===
Raven Recordings

- Jhoom (The intoxication of surrender) (Raven, 2009)
- Bardo (with Boris Grebenshchikov) (Raven, 2002)
- Tribe (Raven, 2001)
- Refuge (with Boris Grebenshchikov) (Raven, 1998)
- Zone Unknown (Raven, 1997)
- Tongues (Raven, 1995)
- Luna (Raven, 1994)
- Trance (Raven, 1992)
- Waves (Raven, 1991)
- Ritual (Raven, 1990)
- Bones (Raven, 1989)
- Initiation (Raven, 1988)
- Totem (Raven, 1985)
- Endless Wave 1 (Raven, 1996)
- Endless Wave 2 (Raven, 2000)
- Music for Slow Flow Yoga (Raven, compilation, 2002)
- Music for Slow Flow Yoga 2 (Raven, compilation, 2003)
- Stillpoint (Raven, compilation, 1996)
- The Movement (Raven, compilation, 2001)
- The Classics (Raven, 4 CD compilation, 2004)

Other producers

- Dancing Toward the One / Sacred Rock (1982) The Moving Center
- Pray Body (1983) The Moving Center
- Path: An Ambient Collection (1995) Windham Hill Records
- Conversations With God: A Windham Hill Collection (1997) Windham Hill Records
- Still Chillin (2005) Aquarius International Music

=== Television and video ===
- I Dance the Body Electric (1993)
- Secret Egypt (1995) Mystic Fire Video (Directed by Sheldon Rochlin)
- The Spiritual Path to Success (1997) Quest special on PBS (now part of the Quest Life Trilogy, only available in the Quest Wisdom Collection).
- Sukhavati: A Mythic Journey (1997 [music]) [DVD 2005] for Joseph Campbell Foundation and PBS (produced, directed, and edited by Maxine Harris and Sheldon Rochlin).
- The Wave: ecstatic dance for body and soul (1993) Sounds True VHS (DVD in Germany (Nietsch, Freiburg) 2000, USA 2004).
- The Power Wave (2001) Sounds True. VHS (DVD in Germany (Nietsch, Freiburg) 2000, USA 2005)
- The Inner Wave (2001) Sounds True. VHS (DVD in Germany (Nietsch, Freiburg) 2000, USA 2005)
- Ecstatic Dance Trilogy (2004) Sounds True.
- Dances of Ecstasy (2003) [featuring: Michelle Mahrer, Nicole Ma and Gabrielle Roth] BBC/Opus Arte
- Open Floor: Dance, Therapy & Transformation (2002) Raven Recording.
- The Great Lesson: A New Film About Mind and Body: Featuring Gabrielle Roth. Great Lesson Productions.(2012)

== See also ==
- 5Rhythms
