= Worship dance =

Sacred dance in Christianity and Messianic Judaism

Worship dance or liturgical dance take on several forms of sacred dance in Christianity and Messianic Judaism, and is usually incorporated into liturgies or worship services. It has encountered controversy and even condemnations from church officials however.

== History ==
Some liturgical dance was common in ancient times or non-Western settings, with precedents in Judaism beginning with accounts of dancing in the Old Testament. An example is the episode when King David danced before the Ark of the Covenant (2 Sam 6:14), but this instance is often considered to be outside of Jewish norms and Rabbinic rituals prescribed at the time.

Dance has historically been controversial within Christianity. Many records exist of prohibitions by leaders of most branches of the Christian Church, for such reasons as the association of dance with paganism, the use of dance for sexual purposes, and a Greek-influenced belief in the separation of soul and body. Beginning in the second half of the 20th century, there was a significant growth in the use of dance in Christian worship. This further spread through the charismatic movement of the 1970s, which initiated a transition to contemporary worship in certain parishes.

A distinctive style of worship dance has developed within Messianic Judaism. Known as messianic dance or davidic dance (for King David), it sometimes incorporates elements of Israeli Folk Dancing.

== Controversies ==
In a 2003 interview with the National Catholic Register, Cardinal Francis Arinze, who was the then-Vatican liturgy chief, stated, “There has never been a document from our Congregation for Divine Worship and Discipline of the Sacraments saying that dance is approved in the Mass.”

Pope Benedict XVI also rejected the introduction of dancing in the liturgy.

“Dancing is not a form of expression for the Christian liturgy ... Wherever applause breaks out in the liturgy because of some human achievement, it is a sure sign that the essence of liturgy has totally disappeared and been replaced by a kind of religious entertainment. Such attractiveness fades quickly—it cannot compete in the market of leisure pursuits, incorporating as it increasingly does various forms of religious titillation. I myself have experienced the replacing of the penitential rite by a dance performance, which, needless to say, received a round of applause. Could there be anything farther removed from true penitence? Liturgy can only attract people when it looks, not at itself, but at God, when it allows Him to enter and act. Then something truly unique happens, beyond competition, and people have a sense that more has taken place than a recreational activity. None of the Christian rites includes dancing.”

— Spirit of the Liturgy, p. 198-199.

== See also ==
- Dance in mythology and religion
- Dancing procession of Echternach
