= Bernhard Wosien =

German dancer and music educator (1908–1986)

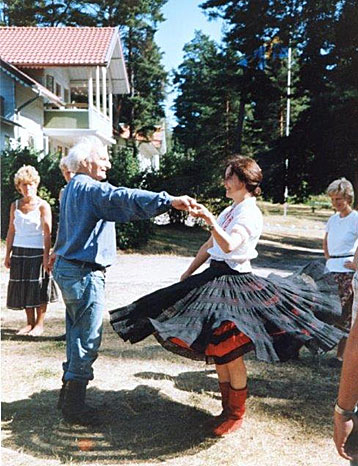
Wosien dancing with Friedel Kloke-Eibl in Sweden, 1982

Bernhard Wosien (19 September 1908, in Passenheim, Masuren – 29 April 1986, Munich) was a German Ballet master, choreographer and professor of expression education and dance. Wosien is the founder of the modern form of sacred dance; he was assisted by his daughter, Maria-Gabriele Wosien.

== Biography ==
Wosien's professional and artistic development included working as a dancer, assistant director, ballet master, dance educator, choreographer, dance scholar and draftsman. He began his career as a long-time stage dancer, moving on to become a dance teacher, using dance and aspects of dancing in spiritual and curative contexts. Wosien ended his career as a Professor without a doctorate at the University of Marburg/Lahn (teaching expression education and dance) and staff at the Friedrich Meinertz Institute (Special needs teacher training) at the Heckscher Clinic in Munich (Empirical research curative education procedures with behaviorally and cerebrally damaged children, development of motion - and expression therapy methods).

From 1976, Wosien introduced circle dance at the Findhorn Foundation in Scotland. He used both traditional dances and his own choreography to develop "group awareness". Wosien's approach was taken up by Anna Barton, both at Findhorn and across Europe in the 1980s, and this style of sacred dance spread around the world.

== Family ==
His daughter, Maria-Gabriele, teaches sacred and folk dance.

== Honours and distinctions ==
- Preis für künstlerisches Volksschaffen I. Klasse der DDR, 1960

== Works ==
- Im Ansturm der Rhythmen. Cranach, Munich, 1959.
- Der Weg des Tänzers. Selbsterfahrung durch Bewegung. Veritas-Verlag, Linz 1988. (3rd edition by Maria-Gabriele Wosien: Metanoia, Bergdietikon 2008, ISBN 978-3-907038-60-4).
- Maria-Gabriele Wosien (ed): Journey of a Dancer. A posthumous compilation. Sarsen Press, Winchester, Hampshire 2016, ISBN 978-0-9934358-2-9.
