= Sacred dance =

Use of dance in religious ceremonies and rituals

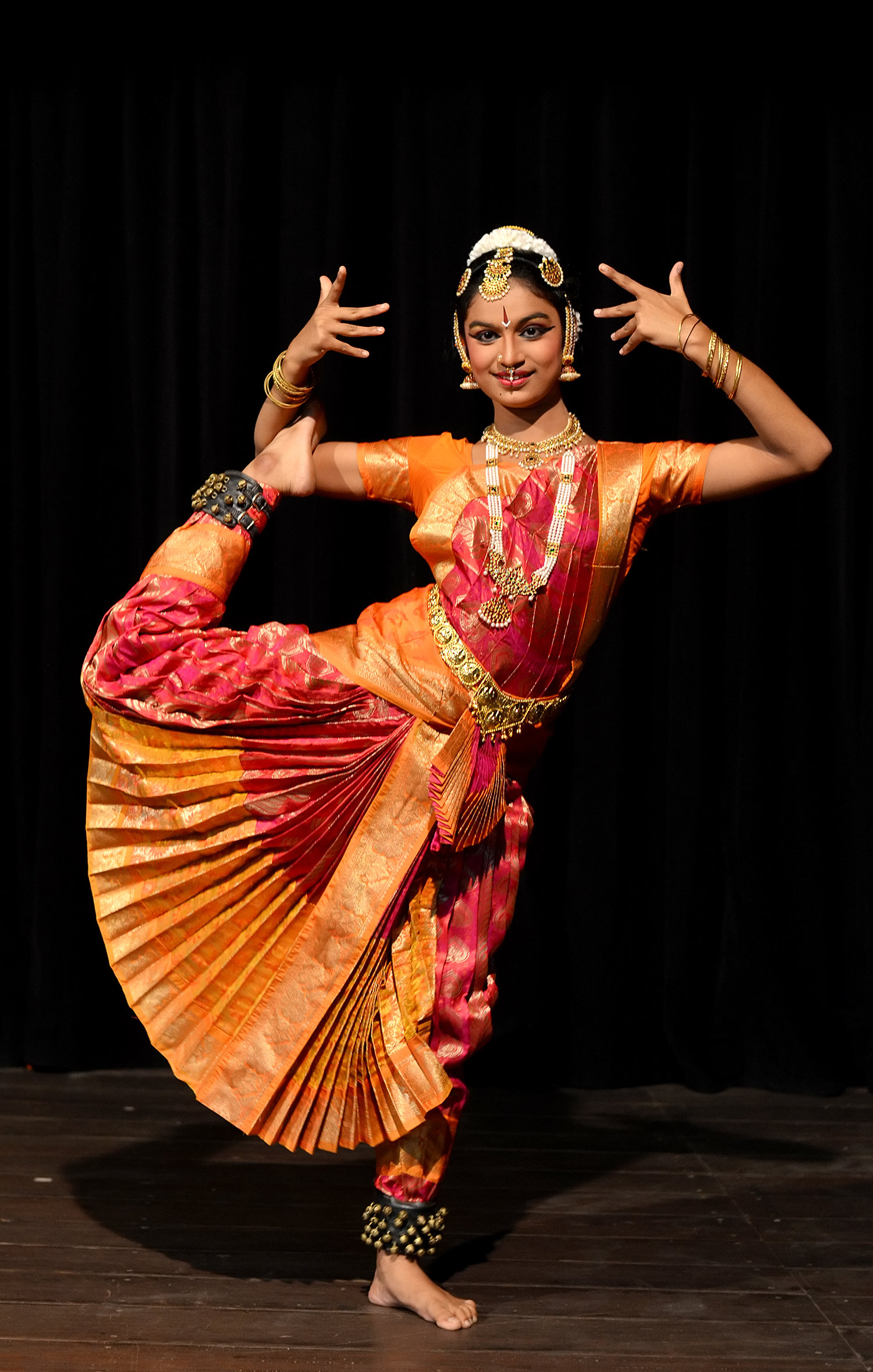
Bharatanatyam, one of the classical sacred dance styles of India

Sacred dance is the use of dance in religious ceremonies and rituals, present in most religions throughout history and prehistory. Its connection with the human body and fertility has caused it to be forbidden by some religions; for example, some branches of Christianity and Islam have prohibited dancing. Dance has formed a major element of worship in Hindu temples, with strictly formalized styles such as Bharatanatyam, which require skilled dancers and temple musicians. In the 20th century, sacred dance has been revived by choreographers such as Bernhard Wosien as a means of developing community spirit.

== Purposes ==
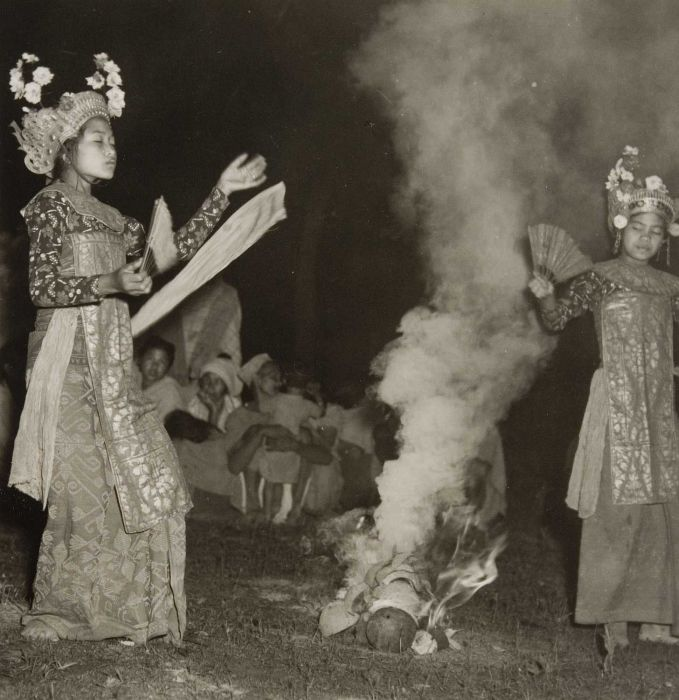
The Balinese Sacred Dance Sanghyang Dedari involves girls being possessed by hyang, Bali, Indonesia

The theologian W. O. E. Oesterley proposed in 1923 that sacred dance had several purposes, the most important being to honour supernatural powers; the other purposes were to "show off" before the powers; to unite the dancer with a supernatural power, as in the dances for the Greek goddesses Demeter and Persephone; making the body suitable as a temporary dwelling-place for the deity, by dancing ecstatically to unconsciousness; making crops grow, or helping or encouraging the deity to make them grow, as with Ariadne's Dance as described in the Iliad; consecrating a victim for sacrifice (as with the Israelites circling the altar, or the Sarawak Kayans circling a sacrificial pig); paying homage to the deity present for an initiation ceremony; helping warriors to victory in battle, and appeasing the spirits of the enemy killed in battle; averting the dangers associated with marriage, at a wedding ceremony; and at a funeral or mourning ceremony, purposes such as driving away the malevolent ghost of the dead person, or preventing the ghost from leaving the grave, or frightening off any evil spirits attracted by the corpse, or temporarily and invisibly bringing the dead person back to join in the dance, or simply honouring the dead person.

The dancer and scholar Harriet Lihs in 2009 divided religious dance into dances of imitation, such as of animals thought to be spirit messengers, or of battles; "medicine dances", i.e. dances of healing, like the serpent dances in India used to prevent disease; commemorative dances, for events such as the winter solstice; and dances for spiritual connection, as in the whirling dance of the Whirling Dervishes within Sufism.

Laura Shannon, a teacher of sacred dance for women, in 2018 stated the purposes of contemporary sacred dance as practised at the Findhorn Foundation as "to be inclusive, mutually supportive, to connect with the earth, spirit and each other, and to become more whole." It was a means of channelling "healing energy" both for the dancers and for their families and communities, indeed for the whole world.

Within religion, ecstatic dance is one of the ways in which religious ecstasy is produced.

== In ancient times ==
Indigenous ceremonial dance rituals around the world appear to preserve forms that were widespread in ancient times. For example, processionals and circle dances seen in indigenous dance today were used in ancient Egypt and among the Hebrews. In ancient Egypt, dancers impersonated a deity such as the goddess Hathor, taking on the deity's attributes and interpreting the divine world for those watching.

In ancient Israel, the Hebrew Bible mentions dancing during religious worship. The prophet Miriam led dancing following the crossing of the Red Sea during the Exodus. During the return of the Ark of the Covenant to Jerusalem, King David danced "before the Lord with all his might". Dancing is mentioned as something familiar, implying it was a common practice. Sacred dance is described in the Bible by verbs meaning dancing, rotating, jumping, skipping, and whirling. The dance was accompanied by hand-drums (tambourines), cymbals, flutes, pipes, lyres, harps, and lutes.

The Hittites are shown in a sacred processional dance in a c. 1200 BCrock inscription at the sanctuary of Yazılıkaya, near their city of Hattusa, in Cappadocia. A group of men wearing conical hats and tip-tilted shoes, and a group of women, dance in a running step towards a group of named gods and goddesses.

In ancient Greece, sacred dance was widespread; indeed, it formed a part of almost all worship, and the gods Apollo, Ares, Dionysus and Pan are all described as dancers, while other deities such as Artemis were described as dancing with their companions.

The Hawaiian Hula dances to Pele, the volcano goddess, survive, whereas European maypole dances have lost their meaning as tree-worship and survive only as folk tradition.

Lewis Farnell, an anthropologist, observed that sacred dance has an "extraordinary uniformity" among indigenous peoples all over the world, something that he found so striking that it suggested either "belief in an ultimately identical tradition, or, perhaps more reasonably, the psychologic theory that ... [humans] at the same stage of development respond with the same ... religious act to the same stimuli" from the environment. Oesterley suggested that these stimuli to sacred dance were people's response to supernatural power, and "the obtaining of food."

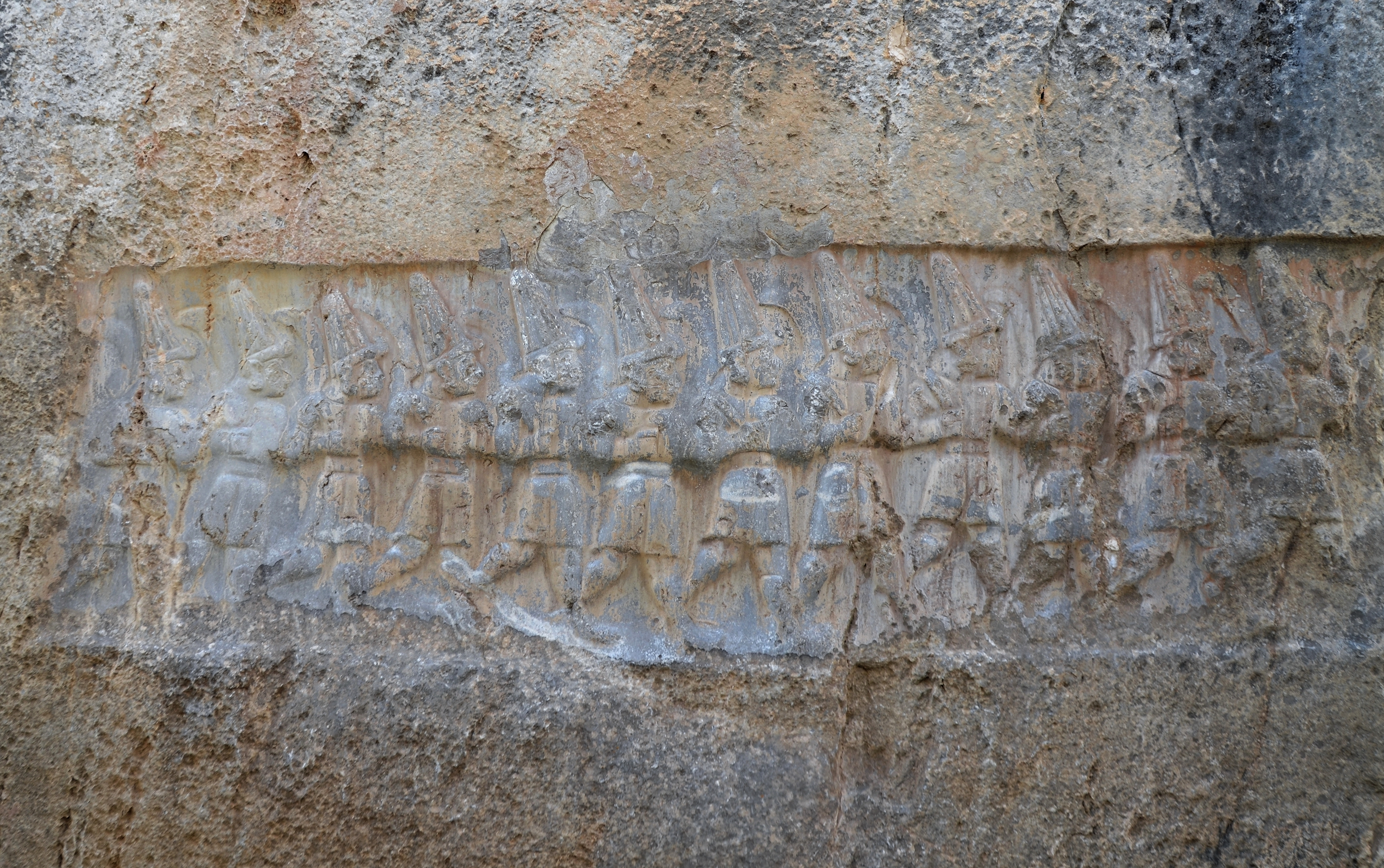
Hittite gods in a processional dance, Yazılıkaya, Hattusa. 13th century BC

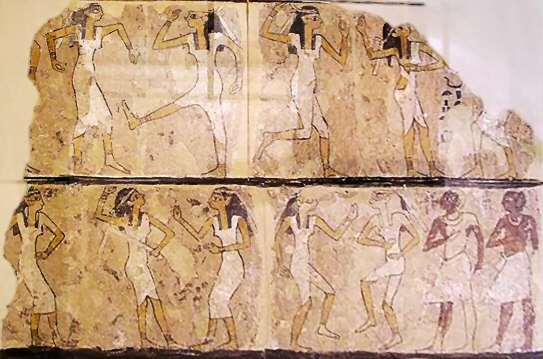
Dancers in ancient Egypt. Tomb of the Dancers, 17th Dynasty, Thebes. 5th or 4th century BC

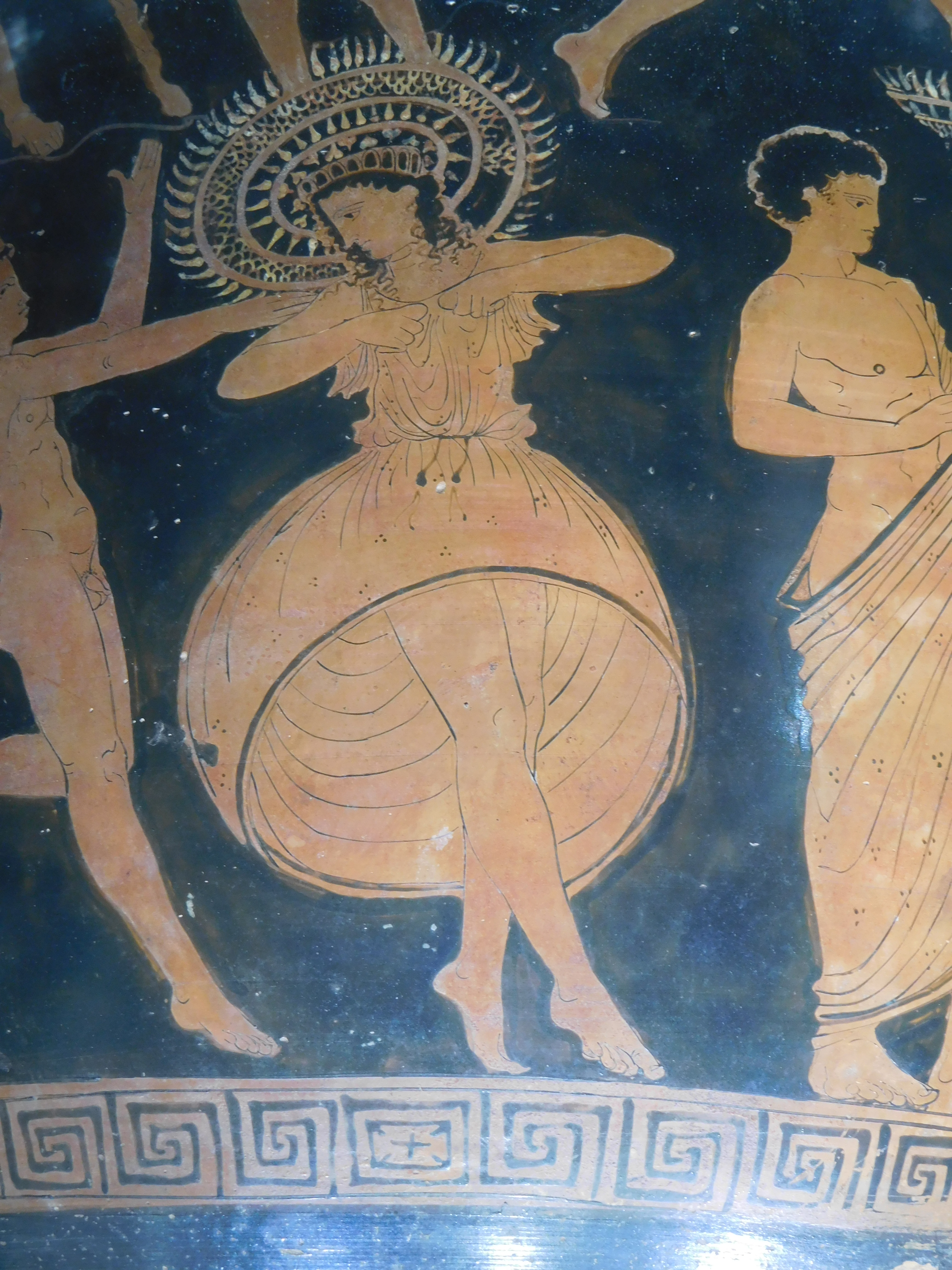
Dancer at festival of Apollo Karneios, wearing kalatiskos straw hat. 5th century BC

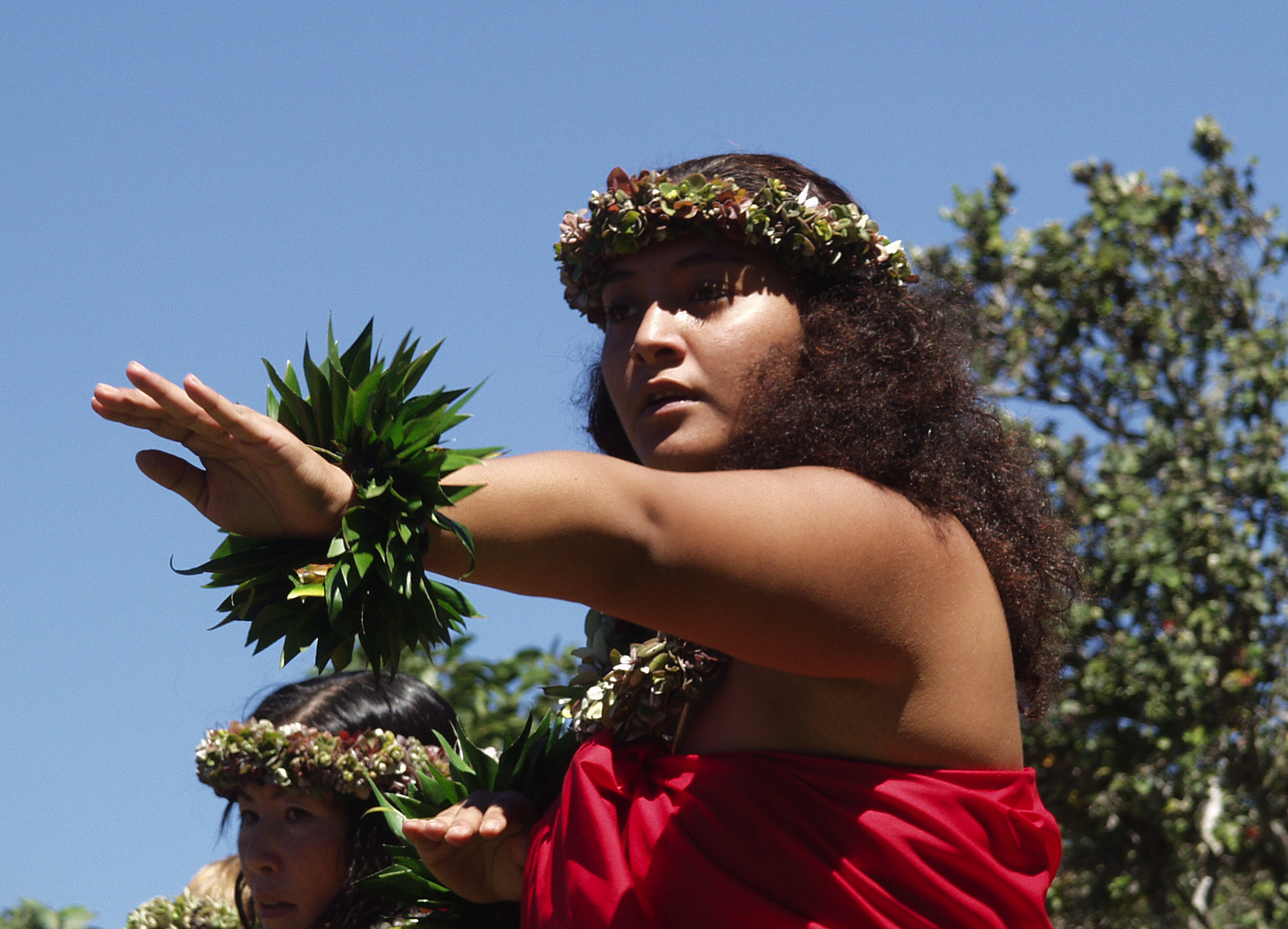
Hula dance in Hawaii derives from the worship of the volcano goddess Pele.

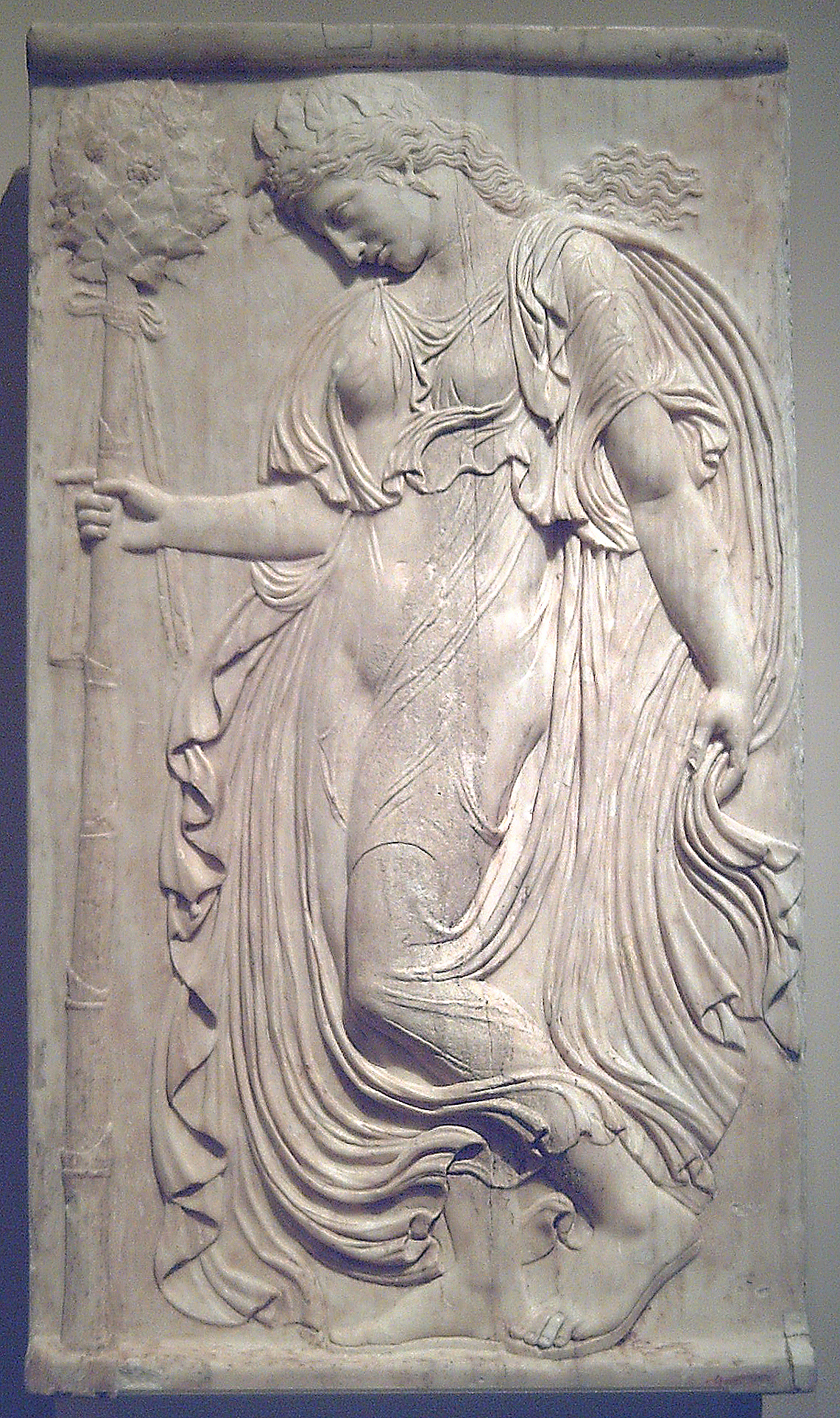
Dancing maenad holding a thyrsus. Roman copy of 5th century BC Greek original

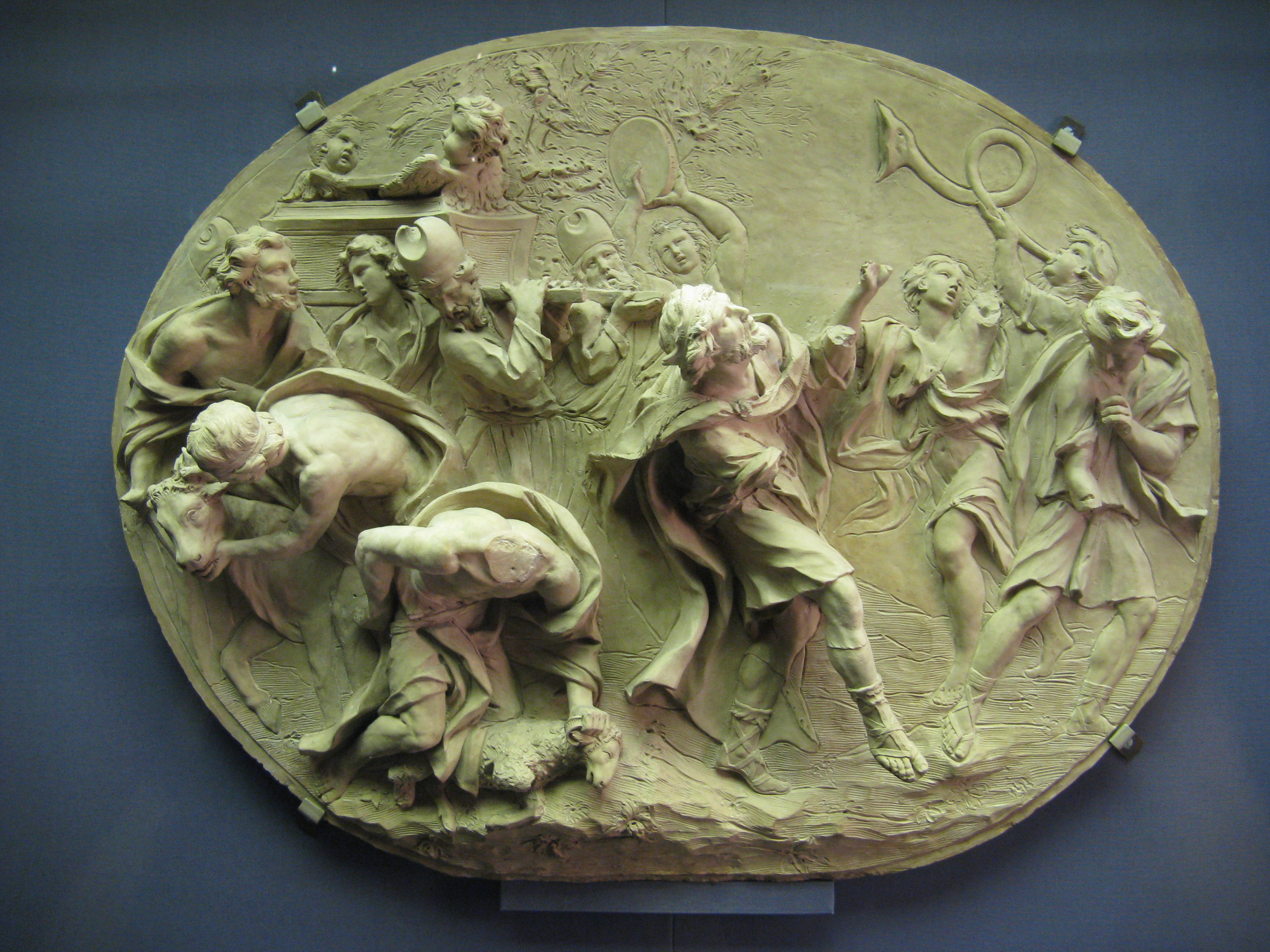
King David dancing before the Ark. Italian terracotta, c. 1660

== In world religions ==
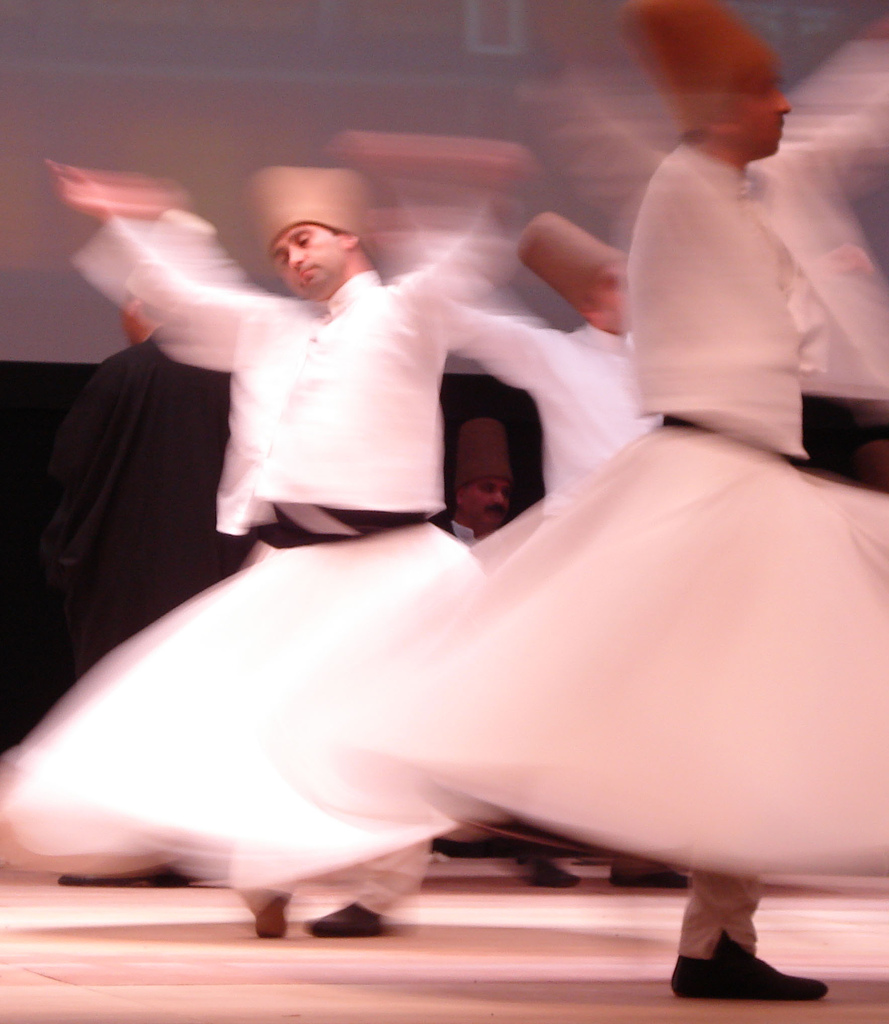
Whirling Dervishes

=== Judaism ===
Judaism observes the festival of Simchat Torah, which includes dancing in synagogues.

The Hasidic movement, which dates from the 18th century, practices dancing in a religious context.

=== Christianity ===
Some Christian traditions make use of liturgical or worship dance, but it has long been controversial within the church. It has been supported, sometimes fervently, by both priests and Christian scholars; and opposed, sometimes stridently, by others who for example wrote some 157 tracts against dance between 1685 and 1963. The early church was largely in favour of dance, with the eminent Church Father Augustine arguing that Christian dance ought to be orderly according to a reasoned rhythm, in harmony with the Jewish tradition, but in contrast to ecstatic Greco-Roman dance. A typical early Christian dance is the 2nd century AD circle dance in the Acts of John which states that "Grace danceth. I would pipe: dance ye all. The whole world on high hath part in our dancing." Circle dance is used, in its more meditative form, in worship within religious traditions including the Church of England. In northern Greece and southern Bulgaria, in the annual celebrations for Saint Constantine and Saint Helen, dancers perform the Anastenaria, a fire-walking ritual, as the climax of three days of processions, music, dancing, and animal sacrifice.

=== Hinduism ===
Indian classical dances such as Bharatanatyam, Kathak, Odissi, and Mohiniattam can be traced to the Sanskrit text Natya Shastra. They are a traditional drama-dance expression of religion, related to Vaishnavism, Shaivism, Shaktism, pan-Hindu epics and the Vedic literature. As a religious art, they are either performed inside the sanctum of a Hindu temple, or near it.

=== Islam and Sufism ===
Dance is unusual within Islam, but circle dance is used in the Islamic Haḍra dances. In the tradition of the Mevlevi Order founded by Rumi, ecstatic Sufi whirling is practised by devotees as a form of active meditation within the Sama (worship ceremony). In 2007, Sufi practices including ecstatic dance and the reciting of religious poetry were a focus for political resistance in Iran, reportedly banned by Shi'a clerics.

=== Syncretic ===
The syncretic Afro-American religious tradition Candomblé, practiced mainly in Brazil, makes use of music and ecstatic dance in which worshippers become possessed by their own tutelary deities, Orishas.

=== Spiritual and New Age ===
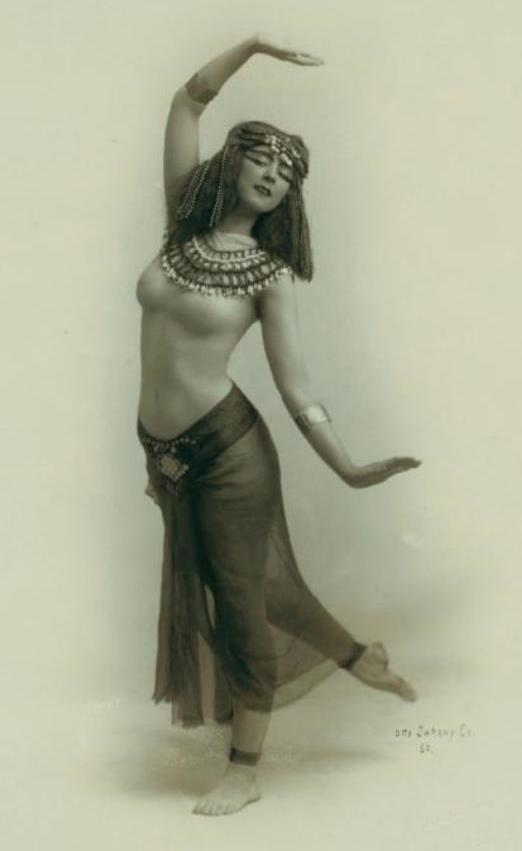
Ruth St. Denis, in a dance pose inspired by the Egyptian goddess Isis. Photographed by Otto Sarony, 1910.

The mystic and spiritual teacher George Gurdjieff collected or authored a series of sacred dances, known as Gurdjieff movements, and taught them to his students as part of what he considered the work of "self observation" and "self study".

The Dances of Universal Peace, created in the 1960s by North American Sufis, leading among whom was Samuel L. Lewis (Sufi Ahmed Murad Chisti). The very first dance took place on 16 March 1968 in San Francisco, California. It uses dancing, Sufi whirling, and singing of sacred phrases from a range different religions and spiritual traditions to raise consciousness and promote peace .

From 1976, the ballet master and choreographer Bernhard Wosien introduced circle dance at the Findhorn Foundation in Scotland. He used both traditional dances and his own choreography to develop "group awareness". Wosien's approach was taken up by the dance teacher Anna Barton, both at Findhorn and across Europe in the 1980s, and this style of sacred dance spread around the world.

== In Western art ==
Choreographers starting with Isadora Duncan, Ruth St. Denis and her husband Ted Shawn, and Martha Graham developed contemporary dance early in the 20th century, often using elements of sacred dance and fusing them with other genres. Later choreographers also made use of themes from the Bible.

== Sources used ==
- Lihs, Harriet (2009). "Chapter 2 | Dance and Religion". Appreciating dance : a guide to the world's liveliest art (4th ed.). Princeton Book Company. pp. 6–17. ISBN 978-0-87127-318-5. OCLC 316057759.
- Oesterley, William Oscar Emil (2010) [1923]. The Sacred Dance: A Study in Comparative Folklore. Kessinger. ISBN 978-1163177228.
- Shannon, Laura, ed. (2016). String of Pearls : celebrating 40 years of sacred dance in the Findhorn Community. Sarsen Press. ISBN 978-0-9934358-5-0. OCLC 1001307546.
- Watts, June (2006). Circle Dancing: Celebrating Sacred Dance. Green Magic. ISBN 978-0-9547230-8-8.
- Wosien, Maria-Gabriele (1974). Sacred Dance: Encounter with the Gods. Thames and Hudson. ISBN 0-500-81006-0.
