= Biodanza =

Dance therapy program

Biodanza (a neologism jointed the Greek bio [life] and the Spanish danza, literally "the dance of life") is a system of self-development using music, movement and positive feelings to deepen self-awareness. It seeks to promote the ability to make a holistic link to oneself and one's emotions and to express them. Practitioners believe that Biodanza opens the space for one to deepen the bonds with others and nature and to express those feelings in a congenial manner.

== Origins and popularity ==
It was created in the 1960s by the Chilean anthropologist and psychologist Rolando Toro Araneda. The Biodanza system is now found in 54 countries, including Argentina, Belgium, Brazil, Chile, Colombia, Czech Republic, Ecuador, France, Germany, Israel, India, Italy, Latvia, Netherlands, New Zealand, Norway, Sweden, Portugal, Spain, Switzerland, United Kingdom, Uruguay, Venezuela, Australia, Japan, South Africa, Canada, United States, Ireland and Russia.

== Purpose and process ==
Practitioners describe Biodanza as a "human integration system of organic renewal, of affective re-education, and of relearning of Life's original functions. Its application consists in leading vivencias through music, singing, movements and group encounter situations". Proponents claim it can be used to develop our human capacities, communication skills, and relationships, including the feeling of happiness.

== Media interest ==
Biodanza has been featured on CNN Chile, on BBC TV and national newspapers in the UK, and in lifestyle magazines in the UK and South Africa.

The Daily Telegraph describes Biodanza as "a series of exercises and moves that aim to promote self-esteem, the joy of life and the expression of emotions. Lots of bounding around and hugs".

== Governing bodies ==
Following the death of its founder in February 2010, two governing bodies of Biodanza currently exist, by means of which students may receive official certificates. The International Biodanza Federation (IBF) governs the Biodanza system in Europe, Australia, New Zealand, the United States and Canada. The US has official schools located in San Francisco, Los Angeles and Maryland. The International Organization of Biodanza SRT governs the Biodanza system in South America.
