= List of ethnic, regional, and folk dances by origin =

This is a list of dances grouped by ethnicity, country, or region. These dances should also be listed on the general, noncategorized index list of specific dances.

== Albania ==
- Dance of Osman Taka
- Entarisi ala benziyor
- Gusharaveli
- Napoloni
- Pogonishte
- Rugovo (sword dance)
- Shota (dance)
- Vallja e cobanit

== Argentina ==
- Carnavalito
- Chacarera
- Cueca
- Cumbia Villera
- Milonga
- Tango
- Zamba

== Armenia ==
Note: in Armenian "bar" means "dance".

- Berd
- Entarisi ala benziyor
- Kochari
- Shalakho
- Tamzara
- Temuraga
- Yarkhushta

== Austria ==
- Ländler
- Schuhplattler
- Tyrolienne
- Waltz

== Azerbaijan ==
- Abayı
- Agir Karadagi
- Anzali
- Asma kasma
- Choban Regsi
- Halay
- Innaby
- Jangi
- Khanchobany
- Ouch noumra, dourd noumra, besh noumra, alti noumra
- Shalakho
- Tarakama
- Tello
- Uzundara
- Youz bir

== Belarus ==
- Liavonicha (Lyavonikha)
- Karahod (Khorovod)
- Trasucha (Poĺka-Trasucha)
- Kryzhachok

== Bolivia ==
- Awki awki
- Bailecito
- Caporales
- Cueca
- Diablada
- Doctorcitos
- Kullawada
- Llamerada
- Morenada
- P'aquchi
- Saya
- Taquirari
- Tobas
- Waka waka

== Brazil ==
- Brazilian Zouk
- Carimbó
- Frevo
- Lambada
- Lundu
- Maculelê
- Maxixe
- Samba
  - Samba de Gafieira
- Suscia
- Xaxado

== Brittany ==
- An Dro
- Gavotte
- Laride
- Plinn
- Trihori

== Bulgaria ==
- Chukano horo
- Daychovo horo
- Gankino horo
- Grancharsko horo
- Kopanitsa
- Lesnoto
- Paidushko horo
- Petrunino horo
- Pravo
- Sadi Moma
- Thomai
- Tropanka
- Yove male mome
- Graovsko horo
- Trite puti
- Dunavsko horo
- Elenino horo
- Maleshevsko horo
- Rukà
- Shirto
- Kjustendilsko selsko horo
- Varnensko horo
- Svornato
- Jangurica
- Chichovo
- Ajdarovo
- Ispajche

== Cambodia ==
- Chhayam
- Peacock dance
- Ramvong
- Robam Neary Chea Chuor

== Catalonia ==
- Sardana

== China ==
- Dragon dance
- Dunhuang dance
- Errenzhuan
- Lion dance
- Yangge
- Yingge dance

== Colombia ==
- Cumbia
- Mapale

== Croatia ==
- Kolo
- Linđo
- Moreška
- Nijemo Kolo

== Cuba ==
- Cuban rumba
- Danzón
- Juego de maní
- Mambo
- Tumba francesa

== Cyprus ==
- Antikristos
- Kalamatianos
- Sousta
- Syrtos
- Tatsia

== Czech Republic ==
- Furiant
- Polka
- Redowa
- Skočná
- Sousedská
- Špacírka

== Denmark ==
- Gammaldans
- Les Lanciers
- Polska

== Dominican Republic ==
- Bachata
- Merengue

== Egypt ==
- Baladi
- Raqs sharqi
- Tahtib
- Tanoura

== England ==
- Border Morris
- Clog dancing
- Maypole
- Morris dance
- Rapper sword

== Ethiopia ==
- Eskista

== Finland ==
- Finnish tango
- Humppa
- Jenkka
- Letkajenkka
- Polska

== France ==
- An dro
- Bal-musette
- Branle
- Bourrée
- Espringale
- Farandole
- Gavotte
- Java
- Loure
- Menuet
- Passepied
- Rigaudon
- Valse musette

== Galicia ==
- Muiñeira

== Georgia ==
- Acharuli
- Cilveloy
- Davluri
- Jeirani
- Karachokheli
- Kartuli
- Kazbeguri
- Khanjluri
- Khevsuruli
- Khorumi
- Kintouri
- Mtiuluri
- Perkhuli
- Samaia

== Germany ==
- Maypole
- Schuhplattler
- Waltz
- Zwiefacher

== Greece ==
The following is a list with the most notable dances. Names of many Greek dances may be found spelt either ending with -o or with -os. This is due to the fact that the word for "dance" in Greek is a masculine noun, while the dance itself can also be referred to by a neuter adjective used substantively. Thus one may find both "hasapiko" ("the butcher thing") and "hasapikos (horos)" - "the butcher (dance)."

- Antikrystos
- Antipatitis
- Ballos
- Fisounis
- Gaitanaki
- Ikariotikos
- Kalamatianos
- Kalymnikos
- Kechagiadikos
- Kerkiraikos
- Kleistos
- Koftos
- Lerikos
- Maniatikos
- Mandilatos
- Pilioritikos
- Pirgousikos (Chios)
- Sianos
- Sirtaki
- Sperveri
- Syrtos
- Trata
- Tsakonikos
- Tsamikos
- Zeibekiko
- Zonaradiko

=== Crete ===
- Angaliastos
- Kanella
- Katsabadianos
- Ntames
- Ntournerakia
- Pentozali
- Pidikhtos
- Sousta
- Trizalis

=== Macedonia ===
- Gerontikos
- Endeka Kozanis
- Kastorianos
- Kapitan Louka
- Leventikos (Florina)
- Makedonikos antikristos
- Makrinitsa dance
- Partalos
- Poustseno
- Proskinitos
- Syrtos Makedonias
- Tranos Choros (Kozani)
- Zaramo

== Guatemala ==
- Baile de la Conquista
- Punta

== Haiti ==
- Affranchi
- Karabinye
- Kontradans
- Kwaze le Wit
- Trese Riban
- Rara
- Kadans
- Twoubadou
- Konpa
- Konpa Direk
- Kompa
- Zouk
- Gouyad
- Menwat
- Rara
- Haitian Carnival
- Rasin
- Meringue
- Carré
- Kreyol
- Affranchi
- Karabiyen
- Kontradans
- Coumbit
- Tumba francesa
- Bamboula
- Battonie
- Mousondi
- Kalenda
- Rabòday

=== Neo-African/Vodou dances ===
- Banda
- Dahomey
- Djouba
- Ibo
- Kongo
- Nago
- Mascawon
- Mayi
- Parigol
- Petwo
- Yanvalou

== Hungary ==
- Csárdás (Czardas)
- Cshebogar
- Karikázó
- Körtánc
- Lánytánc
- Verbunkos

== India ==
- Bhangra
- Bhavai dance
- Chang dance
- Chari Dance
- Charkula
- Cheraw
- Chholiya
- Dandiya Raas
- Gair dance
- Gambhira
- Ghoomar
- Bihu
- Giddha
- Gulikan Theyyam
- Jhumar
- Kachchhi Ghodi dance
- Kalbelia
- Karakattam
- Kikli
- Kummi
- Nati
- Padayani
- Raibeshe
- Sattriya
- Thirayattam
- Tutsa

=== Indian classical dance ===
- Bhagavata Mela
- Bharatanatyam
- Chhau dance
- Garba
- Gaudiya Nritya
- Kathak
- Kathakali
- Kuchipudi
- Lavani
- Manipuri dance
- Mohiniyattam
- Odissi
- Sattriya
- Yakshagana

== Indonesia ==
=== Bali ===
- Baris
- Cendrawasih
- Condong
- Gambuh
- Janger
- Joged
- Kebyar duduk
- Kecak
- Legong
- Oleg
- Panyembrama
- Pendet
- Sanghyang
- Topeng

=== Java ===
- Bedhaya
- Gambyong
- Gandrung
- Kuda lumping
- Lengger
- Reog
- Ronggeng
- Serimpi
- Wayang wong

=== Sunda ===
- Jaipongan
- Merak
- Reog Sunda

=== Betawi ===
- Ronggeng
- Topeng Betawi
- Yapong

=== Aceh ===
- Saman
- Likok Pulo

=== Minangkabau ===
- Indang
- Lilin
- Piring
- Randai

=== Palembang ===
- Gending Sriwijaya
- Tanggai

=== Melayu ===
- Zapin

=== Dayak ===
- Kancet Papatai

=== Minahasa ===
- Kabasaran
- Poco-poco

=== Maluku and Papua ===
- Cakalele

== Iraq ==
- Assyrian folk dance
- Hacha'a
- Khigga

== Iran ==
- Bandari
- Choobazi
- Luri dances
- Tapurian dance

== Ireland ==
- Irish Stepdance
- Irish Sean-Nós Dance

== Israel ==
- Mayim Mayim
- Horah

== Italy ==
- Ballu tundu
- Calabrian Tarantella
- Furlana
- Monferrina
- Piva
- Pizzica
- Saltarello
- Tarantella

== Japan ==
- Angama
- Bon Odori
- Bugaku
- Butoh
- Buyō
- Chakkirako
- Devil's Sword Dance
- Eisa
- Kachaashii
- Kagura
- Kenshibu
- Kumi Odori
- Noh
- Para para
- Shirabyōshi
- Sōran Bushi
- Yosakoi

== Kurdistan ==
- Dilan

== Korea ==
- Barachum
- Buchaechum
- Byeongsin chum
- Ganggangsullae
- Geommu
- Taepyeongmu

== Levant ==
- Dabke

== Macedonia ==
- Crnogorka (dance)
- Kopačka
- Pušteno
- Oro
- Starotikveško
- Teskoto
- Tresenica

== Madagascar ==
- Hiragasy
- Salegy

== Mexico ==
- Concheros
- Chinelos
- Danza de los Viejitos
- Danza de los Voladores
- Huapango
- Jarabe tapatío
- Matachines
- La Raspa

== Middle East ==
- Arab dance

== Mongolia ==
- Biyelgee

== Morocco ==
- Ahidus
- Jedba
- Reggada
- Taskiwin

== Myanmar ==
- Yein

== Netherlands ==
- Klompendans

== Nicaragua ==
- Hunguhungu
- Palo de Mayo

== Nigeria ==
- Atilogwu
- Etighi
- Galala
- Okumkpa
- Ohafia War Dance

== Norway ==
- Bygdedans
- Halling
- Pols
- Rudl
- Springar

== Oman ==
- Ardah
- Fann at-Tanbura
- Khaleegy
- Razha
- Yowlah

== Peru ==
- Apu Inka
- Ch'unchu
- Danza de tijeras
- Danzantes de Levanto
- Huaconada
- Huayno
- Marinera
- Qhapaq Qulla
- Wari
- Zamacueca

== Philippines ==
- Abaruray
- Alcamfor
- Alitaptap
- Ballangbang
- Bendian
- Binasuan
- Blit B'laan
- Cariñosa
- Duwawang Malin Awa
- Habanera Botoleña
- Idudu
- Itik-itik
- Janggay
- Jota and its variations:
  - Jota Cabangan
  - Jota Caviteña
  - Jota Manileña
  - Jota Moncadeña
  - Jota Paragua
  - Jota Quiriño
- Kalatong
- Kappa Malong-Malong
- Kasanduayan
- Kataka-taka
- Kinaranza
- Kuratsa
- Lawiswis Kawayan
- Leron Leron Sinta
- Magkasuyo
- Maglalatik
- Maglangka
- Malagueña
- Manang Biday
- Pandanggo and its variations:
  - Pandanggo sa Bulig
  - Pandanggo sa Ilaw
  - Pandanggo Oasiwas
  - Pandanggo Santa Clara
- Panderetas
- Pangalay
- Pantomina
- Panurong-Surong
- Paru-Parong Bukid
- Pasigin
- Pasikat na Baso
- Pasodoble
- Polka and its variations:
  - Polka sa Nayon
  - Polka sa Plaza
  - Polkabal
- Putungan
- Sagayan
- Sarong Banggi
- Sayaw sa Bangko
- Sayaw Panasahan
- Sinakiki
- Singkil
- Subli
- Tiklos
- Tinikling
- Tutup
- Uyaoy
- Zamboanga
- Zamboanga

== Poland ==
- Krakowiak
- Kujawiak
- Mazurka (Mazur)
- Oberek
- Polonaise
- Trojak
- Varsovienne

== Portugal ==
- Chula
- Corridinho
- Malhão
- Vira

== Provence ==
- Farandole
- Tambourin

== Puerto Rico ==
- Bomba
- Danza
- Plena

== Punjab (India/Pakistan) ==
=== Female dances ===
- Giddha
- Kikli
- Sammi

=== Male dances ===
- Ho Jamalo
- Bhangra
- Dhumal
- Luddi

== Qatar ==
- Al Moradah
- Ardah
- Khaleegy

== Romania ==
- Învârtita
- Căluș
- Hora
- Hora boierească
- Feciorescul
- Sorocul
- Jiana
- Alunelul
- Perinița
- Țarina
- Brașoveanca
- Sârba
- Palatca
- Bătuta din Țara Moților
- Brâul
- Ciuleandra

== Russia ==
- A my proso seyali
- Barynya
- Beryozka
- Bychok
- Curve tanok
- Gusachok
- Kamarinskaya
- Kapustka
- Khorovod
- Metelytsia
- Podushechka
- Troika
- Tropak
- Vo luzyakh
- Yablochko
- Zhuravel

== Rwanda ==
- Intore
- Umushagiriro

== Saudi Arabia ==
- Ardah
- Mizmar

== Scandinavia ==
- Fannike (Danish)
- Halling (Norwegian)
- Hambo (Swedish)
- Humppa (Finnish)
- Jenkka (Finnish)
- Letkajenkka (Finnish)
- Polska (Nordic countries)
- Snoa (Swedish)
- Springar (Norwegian)
- Sønderhoning (Danish)
- Tanhu (Finnish)

== Scotland ==
- Clutha
- Dashing White Sergeant
- Dirk dance
- Duke of Perth
- Earl of Erroll
- Écossaise
- Gay Gordons
- Highland Fling
- Jig
- Pas de Basques and Highcuts
- Reel
  - Reel of the 51st Highlanders
- Roger de Coverley
- Seann triubhas
- Strathspey
- Strip the willow
- Wilt thou go to the barracks, Johnny?

== Serbia ==
- Kolo
- Oro (eagle dance)

== Slovakia ==
- Odzemek

== Somalia ==
- Dhaanto
- Niiko

== South Africa ==
- Indlamu
- Gumboot dance
- Sokkie
- Toyi-toyi
- Volkspele
- Xibelani

== Spain ==
- Aragonaise
- Ball dels Cossiers
- Cachucha
- Corrido
- Fandango
- Flamenco
- Jota
- Muiñeira
- Sardana
- Seguidilla
- Sevillanas
- Zambra
- Zapateado

== Sri Lanka ==
- Kandyan dance

== Sweden ==
- Hambo
- Slängpolska
- Snoa

== Tahiti ==
- 'Aparima
- Hivinau
- 'ote'a
- Pa'o'a
- Tamure
- 'upa'upa

== Thailand ==
- Romvong

== Trinidad and Tobago ==
- Calypso
- Soca
- Limbo

== Turkey ==
- Bar
- Cilveloy
- Horon
- Tamzara
- Temuraga
- Zeybek
- Teke zortlatmasi
- Sirto
- Kasap havasi (Hasapiko)
- Tarakama
- Karsilama
- Kolbastı

== Uganda ==
- Agwara
- Akogo
- Amaggunju
- Bakisimba
- Bwola
- Dingi dingi
- Edonga
- Ekitaguriro
- Ekizino
- Entogoro
- Ewoya Dance
- Larakaraka
- Naleyo
- Okeme
- Orunyege-Ntogoro
- Otole dance
- Tamena Ibuga

== Ukraine ==
- Arkan
- Bereznianka
- Bondar
- Buryma
- Bychky
- Chabarashky
- Chumak
- Holubka
- Hopak
- Hopak-Kolom
- Hutsulka
- Khorovod
- Kolomyjka
- Kozachok
- Metelytsia
- Perepilka
- Pleskach
- Pryvit
- Roman
- Rybka
- Sanzharivka
- Shevchyky
- Shumka
- Tropak
- Tropotianka
- Uvyvanets
- Vesnianky
- Zhuravel

== United Arab Emirates ==
- Ardah
- Khaleegy
- Yowlah

== United States ==
A contra dance in New Hampshire in 1964 or 1965

- Clogging
- Contra dance
- Line
- Salty Dog Rag
- Square dance:
  - Modern western square dance
  - Tap dance
- Swing dance
- Traditional square dance
- Yankee Dutch crossing

=== California ===
- Balboa

=== Hawaii ===
- Hula

=== Louisiana ===
- Cajun:
  - Cajun Jig, also known as Cajun One Step
  - Cajun Two Step
  - Cajun Jitterbug
  - Cajun Waltz
- Zydeco

=== New York ===
- Breakdancing
- Lindy Hop
- Collegiate Shag (Double-Rhythm Shag)
- Salsa

=== North Carolina ===
- Shag (Single-Rhythm Shag)
- Carolina Shag

=== South Carolina ===
- The Big Apple
- Carolina shag
- the Charleston (dance)

=== Texas ===
- Cowboy
- Cotton-Eyed Joe
- Western swing (Texas Swing, Country Swing, Aggie Swing)
- Whip

=== Virginia ===
- Virginia Reel

== Venezuela ==
- Joropo
- Tambor

== Vietnam ==
- Lion dance

== Wales ==
- Hornpipe

== Yemen ==
- North Yemen: Bara'a dance
- South Yemen: Sharh dance

== See also ==
- Index of dance articles
- List of dances
- Outline of dance, a list of general dance topics
