= Turkish folk dance =

Ethnic folk dance tradition

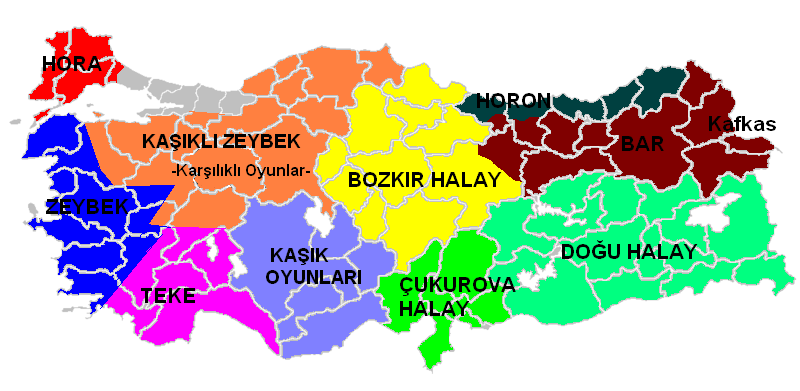
Turkish dance regions: Hora - East Thrace Zeybek - Aegean, Marmara region and Middle-eastern Anatolia Region Teke - Western Mediterranean Region Kaşık Havası and Karşılama - Western Central Anatolia, Western Black Sea, Southern Marmara, Eastern Mediterranean Region Horon - Central and Eastern Black Sea Region Halay - Eastern Anatolia and Central Anatolia Region Bar and Lezginka - Northeastern Anatolia Region

Turkish folk dances are the folk dances of Turkey. Facing three seas, straddling important trade routes, Turkey has a complex, sophisticated culture, reflected in the variety of its dances. The dominant dance forms are types of line dance. There are many different types of folk dances performed in various ways in Turkey. Zeybek, Teke Zortlatması in Aegean region, Bar in Erzurum province, Halay in the central, southern, eastern, and southeastern parts of the country, Hora in Thrace, Horon in the eastern Black Sea region, Spoon dances in and around Konya, and Lezginka in Kars and Ardahan are some of the best known examples of these.

== Types of dance ==
=== Bar ===
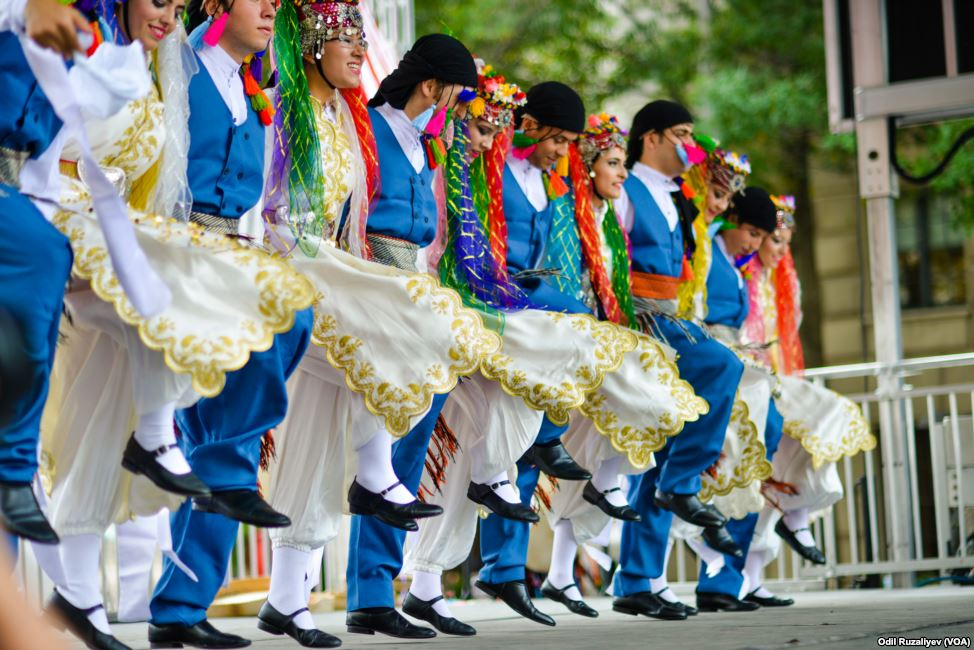
A group performing Bar

With their structure and formation, they are the dances performed by groups in the open. They are spread, in general, over the eastern part of Anatolia (Erzurum, Bayburt, Ağrı, Kars, Artvin and Erzincan provinces). The characteristic of their formation is that they are performed side-by-side, hand, shoulder and arm-in-arm. Woman and man bars are different from one another. The principal instruments of bar dances are davul and zurna (shrill pipe). Later, clarinet has been added to women's bar dances. The dominant measures in bars are 5/8 and 9/8. Occasionally, measures of 6/8 and 12/8 are used. Aksak 9/8 measures which are also the most characteristic measures, in particular, of the Turkish folk music are applied with extremely different and interesting structures in this dance. They normally wear costumes as they dance. They always dance with pride and they turn their hands as they hop dance.

=== Halay ===
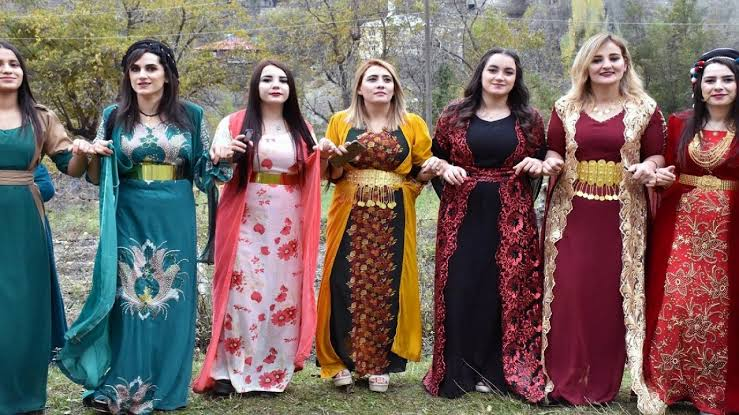
Women performing Halay

Halay is a term used for some of the folk dances found in Turkey and is performed to a large extent in Eastern, South-central, Central, and Southeastern Turkey. The rhythmic and choreographic elements of these dances are very diverse. These dances are mostly performed with davul and zurna combination as well as with kaval (shepherd's pipe), sipsi (reed), çığırtma (fife) or bağlama (an instrument with three double strings played with a plectrum) or performed when folk songs are sung.

=== Horon ===
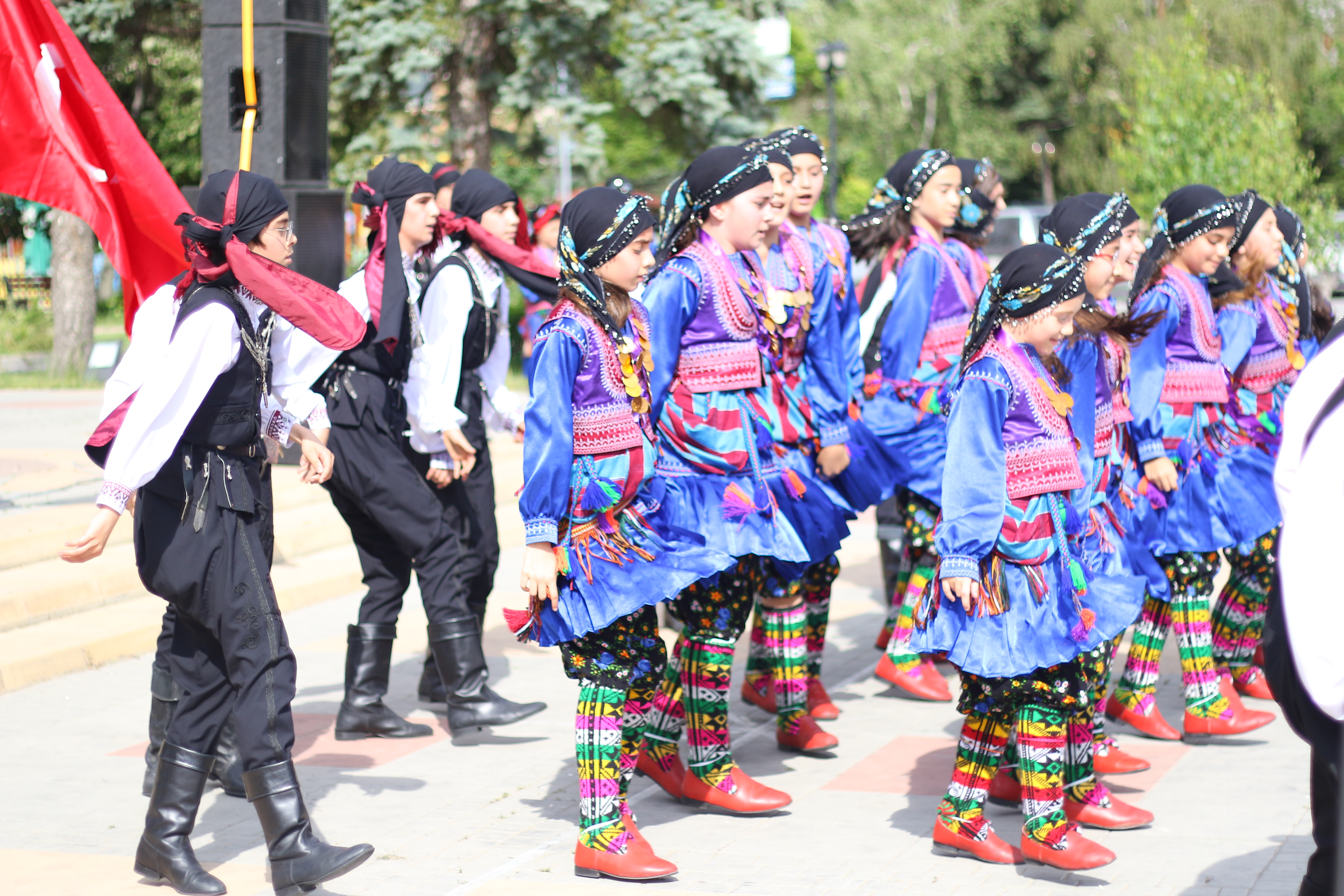
Children perform Horon

The horon (Greek: horos [masculine noun, singular form, nominative]), which derives from the Greek word: choros (Greek: (ο) χορός) meaning dance in both ancient and modern Greek, Turkish: Horon, is a dance style found in the Black Sea region, now modern Turkey. The dances called Horon derived from the Laz culture of the area and are circular in nature, each characterized by distinct short steps. Horon was originally a Laz pagan dance. Horon or the round dance is a typical folk dance of the Black Sea coastal area and its interior parts. Horons appear very different from the folk dances in other parts of the country with their formation of tempo, rhythm and measure. Horons are performed, in general, by groups and their characteristic measure is 7/16 For their melodies are rendered very fast, it is very difficult to render them with every instrument. For this reason, rendering with a drum and zurna becomes practical. Melodies of horon are performed with the small type of zurna which is called 'cura'. In addition, in the interior parts blowing instruments such as bagpipe mey (again, a small zurna) etc. The other measures used are 2/4, 5/8 and 9/16.

=== Zeybek ===
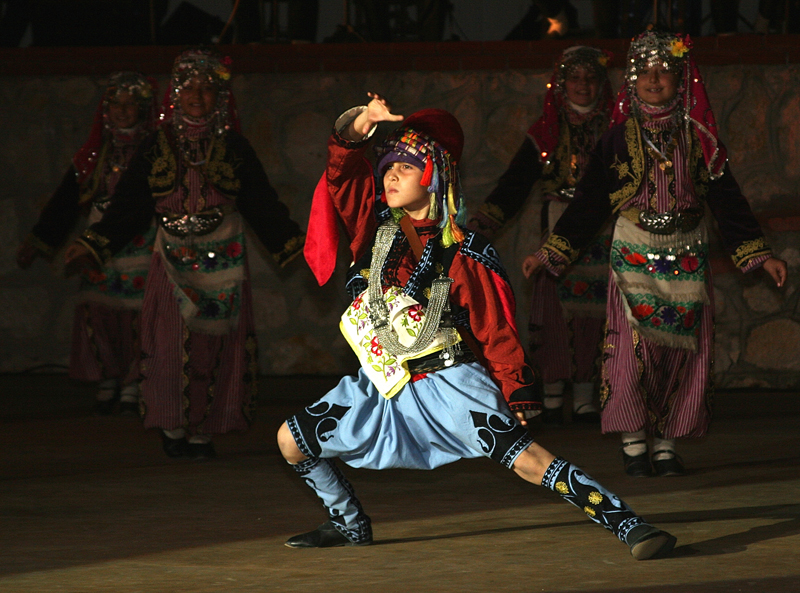
Children perform Zeybek

Zeybeks are, in general, the widespread folk dances of the Western Anatolia. Zeybek dance originated from the Zeybeks of the Aegean region. The dance is rendered by one person or two or by a group of people and its name changes for example as 'seymen' in the central parts of Anatolia. Zeybek dances are formed, in general, of 9/8 measures and have a variety of tempos such as very slow, slow, fast and very fast. Very slow zeybek dances have the measure of 9/2, slow ones 9/4 and some others 9/8. Very fast dances, for instance, teke (goat) dance seen in Burdur – Fethiye region can be regarded as dances of zeybek character, they have the traditional measure of 9/16. There is another folk dance named as bengi in the zeybek region. It is performed more differently from the zeybek and has got a different musical feature and the most characteristic measure of bengi dance is 9/8. Particularly in slow zeybeks, the traditional instruments is drum and zurna combination. The use of 2 drums and 2 zurnas in combination is a tradition, function of one of the zurnas is accompaniment, in other words, it accompanies the melody with a second constant tune. Apart from drum-zurna, a three-double string instrument bağlama, reed, marrow bow etc. are used for fast zeybek dances. In particular, the traditional instrument of the teke (goat) dance region is reed.

=== Other forms ===
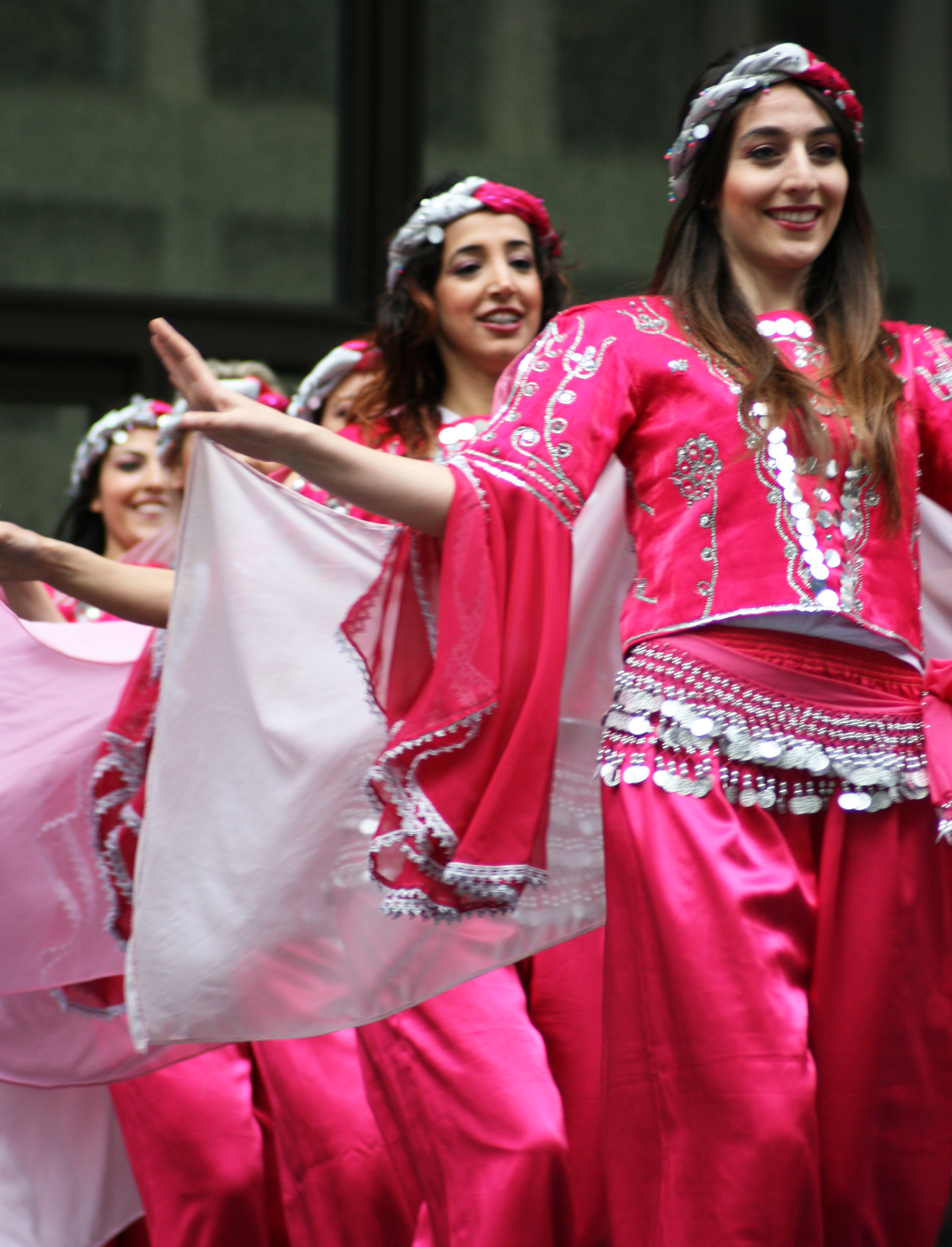
Tsifteteli/Çiftetelli

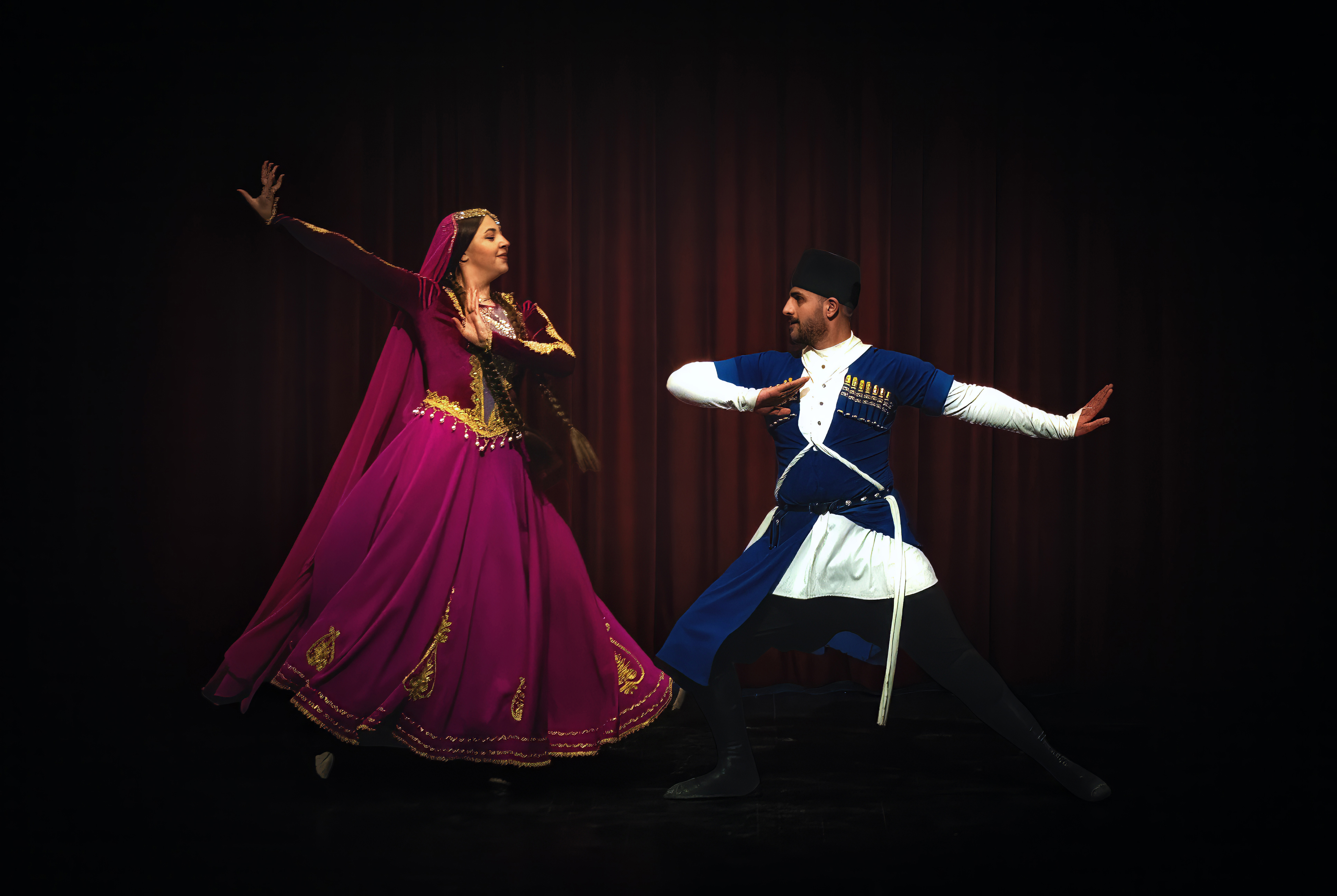
Lezginka

- Karsilamas: (a kind of wedding music) and hora (from ancient Greek art form of χορεία) type folk dances with melodic and rhythmic structure and with a fast performance facing one another and different cultural structure of the region and the dominant measure is 9/8 but some other measures are used as well. Their traditional instrument are 2 drum and 2 zurna combination, the most characteristic use of this combination is seen in this region. It can be found also as, Tsifteteli/Çiftetelli.
- Kasap havasi/Hasapiko: meaning "the butcher's dance" from Turkish: kasap "butcher", is a modern dance from Istanbul and East Thrace. The dance has its origins in Byzantine times by butchers, taken by the Byzantine military.
- Kaşık Oyunları: (Wooden-spoon dances): these dances, in general, are mostly spread over the Mediterranean region and have a very different structure with their arrangement performance, rhythmic and melodic characteristics. They are always rendered with wooden- spoons and the characteristic measure is 2/4 or 4/4. The instruments used are beast bow (later violin), baglama and clarinet, in general, they are accompanied by folk songs. Dinar is probably the best known of the "wooden spoon dances"
- Kolbastı: Kolbastı is among teens in common and widespread.
- Lezginka: Lezginka is mainly performed in Kars and Ardahan.
- Samah: Samah melodies have the measures of 5/8, 7/8 and 9/8. Their traditional instruments are baglama, bow etc. There is no rhythmic instrument. Performance by singing (without any instrument) is also widespread. The most developed samahs are of 3 parts, namely: ağırlama (entertainment), yeldirme (cloak wearing) and koğdurma (dismissing).
- Syrtos: They are Greek circle dances, originated in ancient Greece, named Syrtos, from σύρω, syro, "drag [the dance]" and can be found mostly at the region of Pontus.
- Shiksaray: is Turkish dance, with origins in Black Sea Region.

== See also ==
- Culture of the Ottoman Empire
- Ottoman music
- Culture of Turkey
- Turkish Cypriot folk dances
- Turkish folklore
- Assyrian folk dance
- Kurdish dance
- Armenian dance
- Pontic Greek folk dance
