= Snoa =

Snoa may refer to:

- Curaçao synagogue or Mikvé Israel-Emanuel Synagogue
- Snoa (dance), a traditional Swedish couple dance
