= Hungarian folk dance =

Type of dance from Hungary

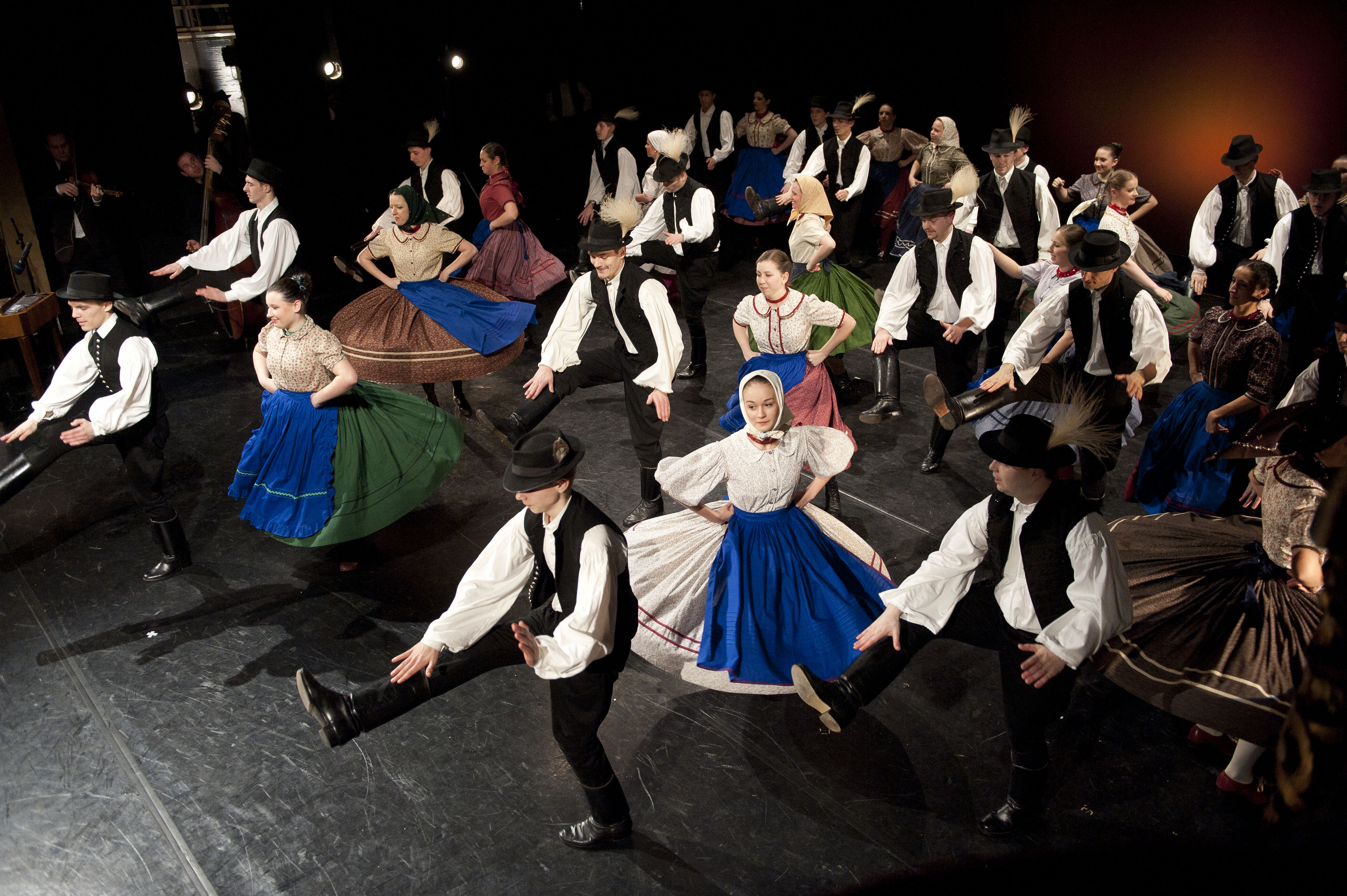
Hungarian folk dancers from the city of Kecskemét.

Hungarian dance refers to the folk dances practised and performed by the Hungarians, both amongst the populations native to Hungary and also amongst the Hungarian diaspora.

According to György Martin, a prominent folklore expert, Hungarian dances can be divided into two categories. The first refers to dances performed in the Middle Ages while the second relates to the 18th and 19th century. Hungarians have been noted for their "exceptionally well developed sense of rhythm". In the mid-19th century, Musicologist Theodor Billroth performed tests with troops of various nationalities stationed in Vienna and found that the Hungarian troops outperformed others in keeping time with music.

Improvisation and energetic movements are often mentioned as being characteristic of Hungarian dance. Daniel Berzsenyi wrote, "Its secret laws are not ordered by craft. The laws are its own and enthusiasm sets the limit." Elizabeth Charlotte Rearick wrote, "The peasant dance is not one which is set absolutely according to rule; the dancer constructs his steps according to his mood and ingenuity." Collections of the Folk Music Research Group of the Hungarian Academy of Sciences, and the national Ethnographic Museum of the State Folk Ensemble cover almost 10,000 dance variations from 700 Hungarian villages.

The Reformed Church in Hungary was opposed to dancing, but the Catholic Church was less restrictive. Some Catholic authors wrote of their approval of dancing, particularly in heaven. One early 16th-century nun who described that "dancing will be essential there for the strong, well-built bodies of the saints," while in the 18th century, Catholic priest Zsigmond Csuzy wrote "There would have to be dancing (in heaven) for the itching soles of the Hungarian whose whole life on earth is a dancing school."

== History ==
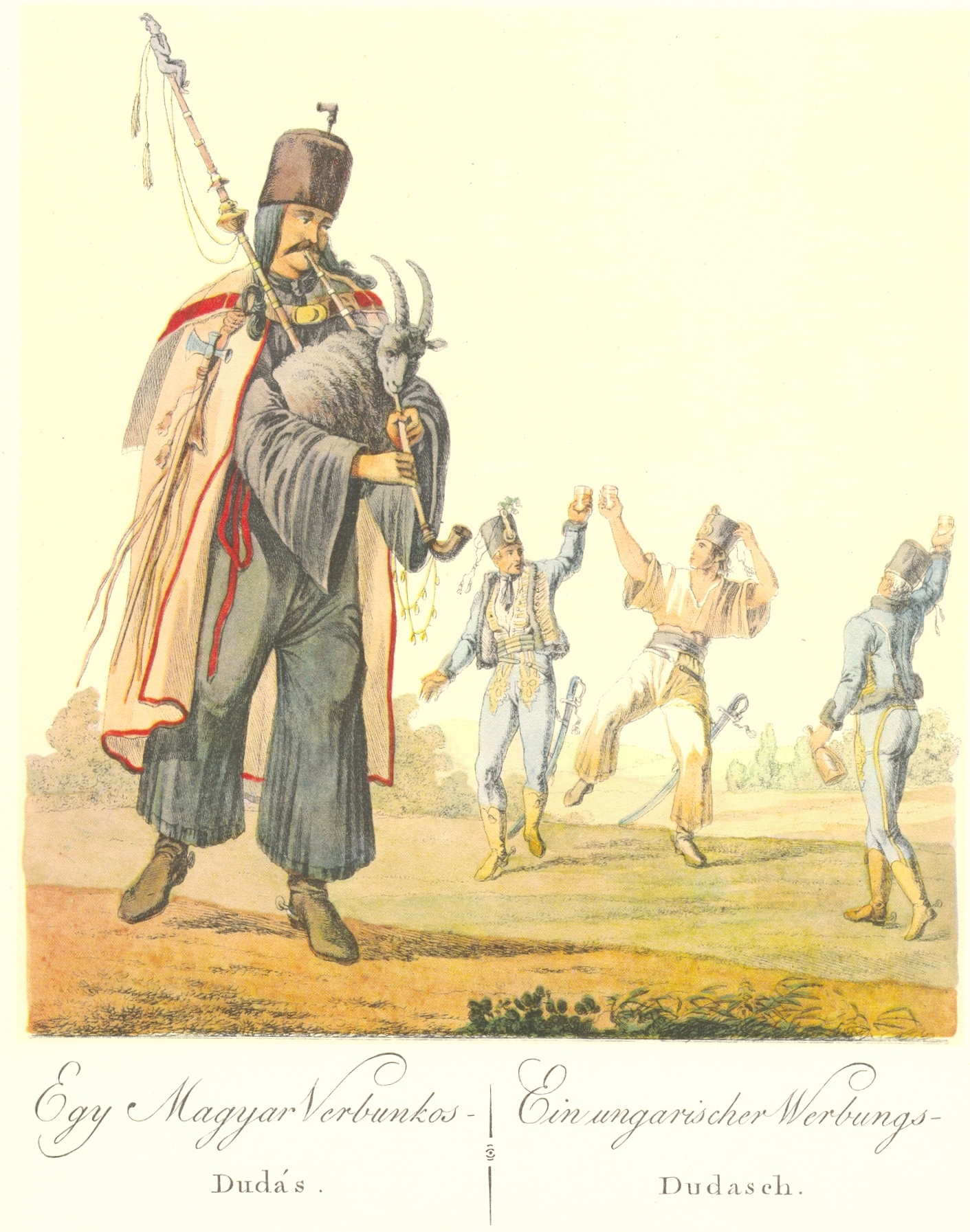
Soldiers dancing the verbunk to the tune of a bagpiper. 1816

The dance arts of the ancient Hungarians—like those of most nomadic peoples—have largely disappeared. Their dances and music were not recorded, and so we can only learn about them indirectly.

Modern historians know relatively the most about the ancient melodic world of the Hungarians, since its legacy still lives on in the oldest layer of Hungarian folk music. Archaic Hungarian folk songs show striking similarities to the music of certain Finno-Ugric and Turkic peoples, which can only be explained by the idea that "the Hungarians brought it with them from their ancient homeland as an ancestral heritage along with their language" (Zoltán Kodály). Any original, ancient elements in Hungarian dances have long since disappeared, leaving no clear connection to any currently known forms.

The earliest known mention of Hungarian dance is found in records of the 926 raid on the Abbey of Saint Gall, where the Hungarians, after their victorious attack, were reported to perform a joyful, combative dance. Later records indicate that dancing remained a significant part of Hungarian culture even after the adoption of Christianity: the 1279 Synod of Buda instructed priests not to allow people to break into dance inside the church, the churchyard or cemetery—an order that ultimately had little effect. Dancing in cemeteries is further attested to in several other documents throughout the medieval period, like the 16th century work Ungarischer oder Dacianischer Simplicissimus, leading to the conclusion that cemetery-dancing was an integral ritualistic dance in folk tradition. Some funeral dances, then performed before the traditional wedding feast, survived until at least the 1940s.

From a historical standpoint, Hungarian folk dances can be divided into two distinct groups. The old stratum comprises dances attested to in sources before the 18th century and are presumed to go back to the Middle Ages. This group, which includes types such as the Karikázó, Ugrós, Legényes and many others, shares connections with medieval dance forms found throughout Europe. The new stratum comprises dances attested to in sources of the 18th century or later. These dances, including the Verbunk and Csárdás, have come to define the Hungarian national dance tradition both domestically and internationally.

Academic interest in Hungarian folk dance is traced back to the late 18th and early 19th centuries. Intellectuals and writers like Mihály Csokonai, Dániel Berzsenyi, János Garay, and János Arany noted and documented dance characteristics. By the early 20th century researchers compiled detailed analyses of Hungarian dances, focusing on their historical, formal, musical, and stylistic features. The systematic collection of Hungarian folk dances began in the early 1920s with pioneers like László Lajtha and Sándor Gönyey, who used film and phonograph recordings to capture dances more precisely. The Gyöngyösbokréta movement of the 1930s helped propel public interest in the study of folk dances. After 1945, folk dance research gained state support which led to the establishment of key institutions like the Research Centre for the Humanities Institute for Musicology.

In the 20th and 21st centuries, traditional Hungarian folk dances have gradually faded from everyday public use due to the effects of urbanization and social change. As urban, fashionable dance styles spread, folk dances lost their cultural significance and were increasingly marginalized. In response, a grassroots movement known as the Revival emerged to preserve and revitalize these traditions. One of the most successful efforts has been the global Táncház movement, which emerged in the 1970s and has created a space where ordinary people can learn and engage in traditional Hungarian dance styles.

== Dance Traditions ==
=== Dances ===
In the dance traditions of Hungarian villages across the Carpathian Basin the repertoire of folk dances was relatively small and consistent from one area to another. Typically, a community maintained only four or five core kinds: the circle dance, the male dance, the slow and quick couple dance and dances with implements preserving the remnants of old weapon dances. In spite of their modest number, the almost total absence of strict choreographic rules in solo and couple dances allowed for a wide degree of individual variation and improvisation.

==== Dances with implements ====
Historical sources of the 16th to 18th centuries often mention the hajdútánc, a male dance accompanied by the skillful manipulation of a weapon and acrobatic steps closely interwoven with fighting movements. It was performed either solo or in groups, and even sometimes with women. By the early 18th century, however, it disappeared in its original form and gave rise to implement dances that retain only hints of their original martial character.

The remaining implement dances vary widely and may be performed solo, in groups or by couples. These dances, most often performed with sticks, shepherds’ crooks, or different axes, are referred to as kanásztánc or botoló and can mostly be found in southern Transdanubia and in the Alföld, where it has retained a duel-like form and is also practiced by the local Romani population. There also exists a variant danced with a broom, called söprűtánc.

==== Circle and chain dances ====
There exist several different types of circle and chain dance across the Hungarian language area. The girls’ circle dance, referred to as karikázó, is a circle dance performed by women only accompanied by the singing of folksongs. It is very closely connected with medieval European circle dances and is most popular in Transdanubia. The rise of other dance forms over time has pushed this dance to the periphery of folk dance tradition, where it took the role of entertainment in the periods of fasting without dance and music, and in the intervals between dances during dance events. The karikázó consists of a few simple motifs, some of which resemble those used in Faroese dances, but most attention is given to singing, which is done by all women in unison. In some areas without it, the girls' circle dance is substituted during dance events by the körcsárdás, an offshoot of the csárdás which is danced by both men and women in a circle.

The many chain dances of the Csángó of Gyimes are collectively referred to as héjsza. These dances are composed of short, repeating sections built from either longer compound motifs or short motif sequences, representing a simpler form of Balkan chain dances. There exist around ten different kinds. The dances of the Csángó of Western Moldavia also include more than a dozen archaic circle dances.

==== Ugrós ====
The ugrós encompasses a large group of dances closely related to the kanásztánc, with the main distinguishing factor being that it is danced without implements. The structures, forms and motifs of these two large families often overlap in both historical sources and in their recent variants. Dances of the ugrós type may be performed by men, women, or mixed groups, and may take solo, couple, quartet, or chain dance forms. There are many regional subtypes of the ugrós, often known by different names: cinege, mars, dus, oláhos and féloláhos, among others. These regional types can primarily be differentiated by the complexity of the motif repertoire.

The ugrós dances have been found across the entire Carpathian Basin with the most characteristic variants being in Transdanubia. Nevertheless, they are notably absent from some regions such as central Transylvania, where they were superseded by the legényes. Certain forms, such as the féloláhos danced in Gyimes, are part of a transition between the freer, more irregular and simpler ugrós and the regulated and complex legényes.

==== Legényes ====
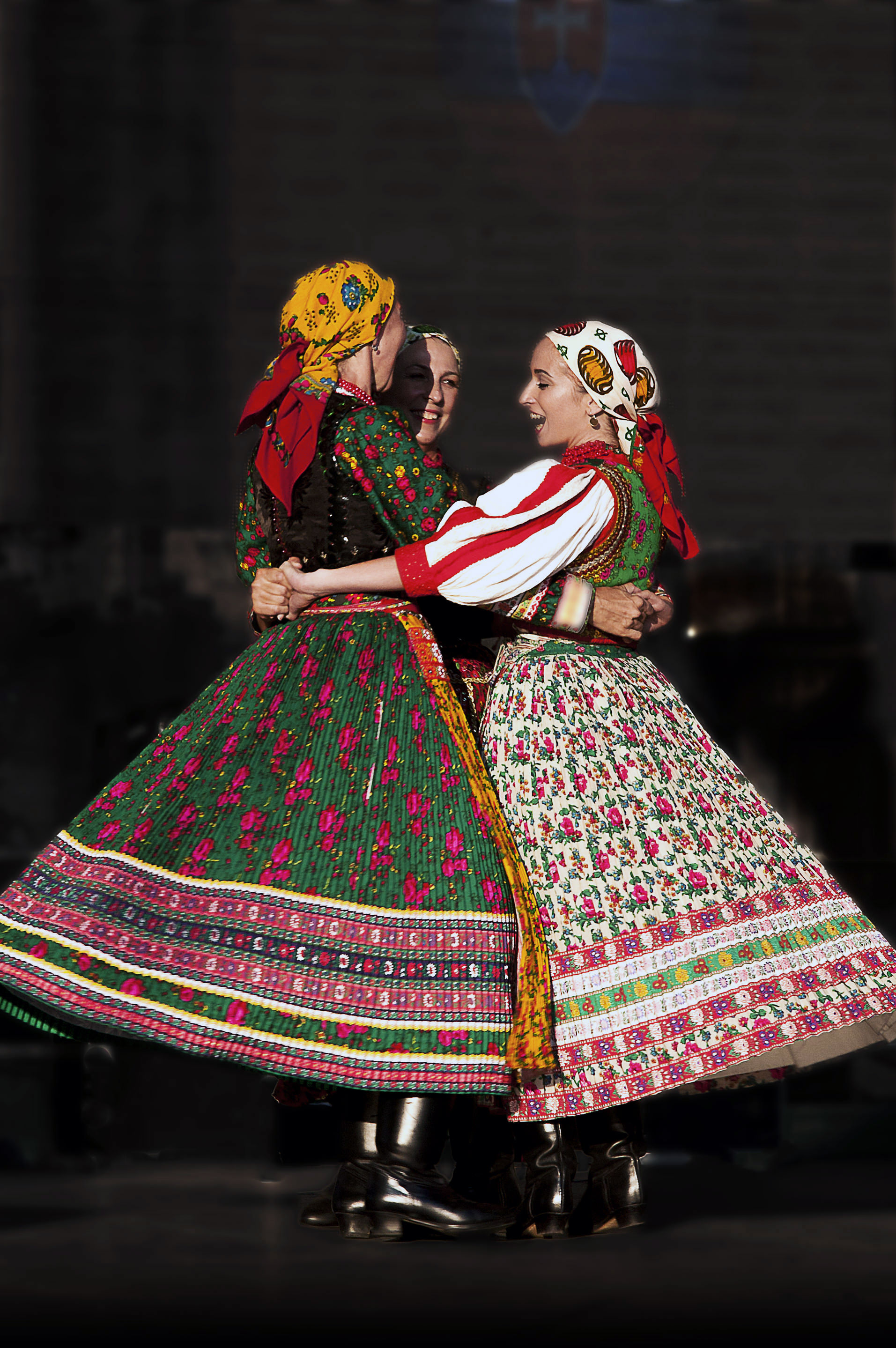
Women dancing the sifitelés

The old male dance native to central Transylvania, the legényes, is considered one of the most intricate male solo and group dance traditions in Eastern Europe. The main characteristic of the dance is its large wealth of unique motifs; some dancers master up to 30 different motifs with complex rhythms and intricate structure. Despite its improvisatory character the dance is closely tied to the phrasing of the accompanying music, organized into eight-measure periods, called pont, each concluded with closing formulae. Girls accompany the male dance by shouting out rhymes to the music and often perform circle dances which, in the region of Kalotaszeg, is called sifitelés.

There are both slow and fast variants of the legényes, which are often joined together during dance events. The rhythmically richer slow form, the ritka legényes, is the characteristic male dance of the Mezőség, and is typically paired with its fast counterpart, the sűrű legényes. There exist many other forms of the legényes, which vary wildly across regions.

==== Turning couple dances ====
The turning couple dances, broadly classified as the forgós-forgatós páros, are a collection of old-style couple dances of Western European origin that entered the Hungarian folk dance repertoire by the late 16th century. This archaic dance type has survived to the present day and forms an almost united dance tradition among the Hungarians and Romanians of Transylvania and the Slovaks, Gorals and eastern Moravians of the Carpathian Mountains. The new-style csárdás almost totally assimilated the turning couple dances across most of the Hungarian language area, and the two blend into one another even in the areas where the turning couple dances have survived.

Some of the many turning couple dances include the lassú and friss csárdás and the lassú cigánytánc or akasztós in Mezőség; the forgatós or korcsos in Marosszék; and the Gyimes Csángó lassú and sebes magyaros and the archaic kettős, which incorporates both a marching dance and a turning dance. The Hungarian and Romanian turning couple dances share many aspects in common and are sometimes completely identical to each other in terms of music, rhythm, motifs, and structure.

==== Verbunk ====
The verbunk is a male dance that developed alongside the verbunkos musical style from the mid-18th to the early 19th century. Its origins lay in the Habsburg and later Austro-Hungarian recruiting practice of the verbuválás, where young men were enticed to join the army by offers of music, dance, drink, wealth and noble rank. The verbunk dances known today are most likely the remnants of a male dance that was integrated into and greatly morphed by the historical recruiting dance. The verbunk very quickly gained popularity among the noble elites and the peasantry; it became one of the most important elements of the developing national culture in the Romantic era during the 19th century.

Its solo form is irregular in structure, rich in motifs and widespread across the Hungarian language area, but there also exist rare regulated variants danced in a circle or semicircle, which are to some extent related to the Austrian Schuhplattler. Traditionally, dance events opened with the verbunk, though in later periods it was performed mainly on request. In some areas, women also performed simpler versions of the dance.

==== Csárdás ====
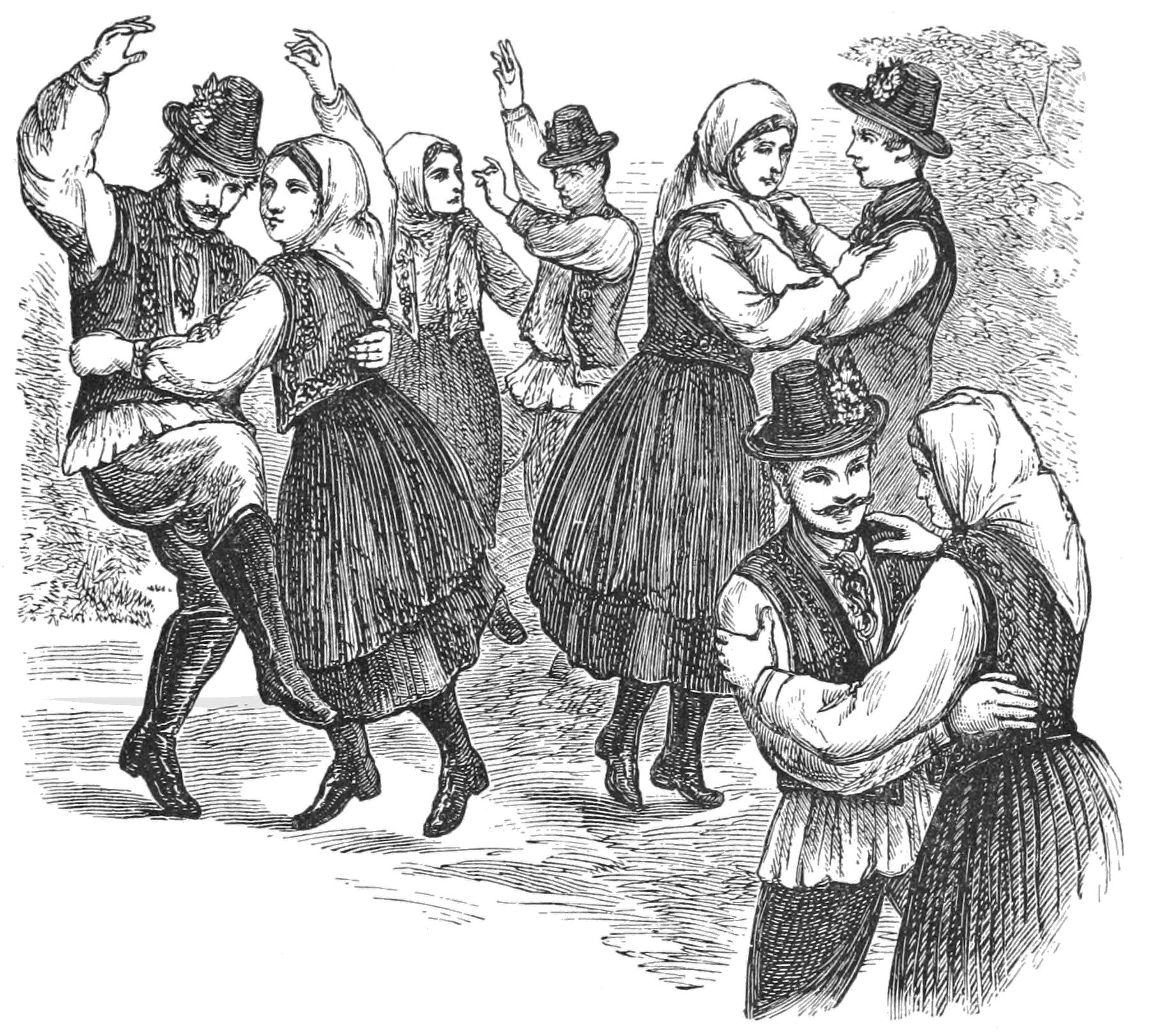
1892 engraving of csárdás dance from Popular Science

The csárdás is the national dance of Hungary and is regarded as the most important Hungarian folk dance. It was popularized, reached its national status and was given its name in the early 19th century, but is nonetheless related to some old European couple dances from before the 18th century. It was described by sources of the era as "similar to ever-changing flame-whirling, symbolizing unbound freedom."

The csárdás consists of the slow lassú and the fast friss sections, which often share motifs. The lassú csárdás is characterized by the two-step motif, called csárdáslépés, while some distinct motifs found throughout the entire dance are the half-turn with the bending of the knee called lippentős and the playful releasing of the partner. There are also some rare variants, like the hármascsárdás, danced by a man and two women, and the körcsárdás, danced in a circle. Different regions have their own characteristic versions of the csárdás, and, owing to its improvisatory character, the dance can differ greatly from one area to the next and often includes motifs from the verbunk.

=== Dance cycle ===
The dance cycle, known as táncciklus, is the suite-like ordering of dances during a dance event. It is a half-hour to an hour long and most commonly formed from three to five dances traditionally used in a community. The dances are played in succession, connected without pauses or through momentary interruptions, in an order set by the táncrend—the traditional order of dances in a dance cycle. The couple dances in the dance cycle are always performed with the same partner. This process lasts until the dancers and musicians become tired or run out of dances, after which a break starts. Then, other dances not traditionally included in the dance cycle may be performed sporadically with or without music, until the beginning of the next dance cycle.

Different styles mix together during a dance cycle, though usually old-style dances appear first, followed by new-style dances; and usually slower dances come before the faster ones—in the case of different dance types multiple times in a cycle. For example, in central Transylvania the slow and fast male dances are commonly followed by the slow and fast couple dances. Some foreign dances incorporated by the community, like the polka, may also appear during the dance cycle.

=== Dance rhymes ===
A dance rhyme, or táncszó, is a short verse, usually two to four lines long, shouted—not sung—to the rhythm of the music. It serves as a method of self-expression during the dance, with themes ranging from the poetic and philosophical to expressions of love, pride, joy, sadness, irony, mockery, or even obscenity. Regardless of its content, the rhyme carries no social or personal consequences for the dancer shouting it. Numerous collections of dance rhymes have been compiled and classified to varying degrees of academic rigor. One of the most prominent is Gyula Pálfy's collection of around 1500 dance rhymes, gathered from multiple regions around the late 19th and early 20th centuries.

== Revival ==
The Hungarian folk dance revival is a social movement rooted in village traditions, drawing on dances and music documented mainly during the 20th century. Within the revival, these collections are learned and reproduced as recorded, which makes the dance and motif repertoire relatively fixed and unchanging. Dancers of the revival movement participate in folk dancing as a way to express themselves, socialize, relax and connect with history.

=== Gyöngyösbokréta ===
The Gyöngyösbokréta (Pearly Bouquet) was an artistic movement that organised theatrical performances of folk dances, music and folk games by traditional villager dancers in major cities such as Budapest. It is considered an important precursor to the modern revival movement. The first performances were organised by Béla Paulini in 1931, and the movement quickly spread across most of the Hungarian language area. At its height, Paulini’s Bokréta szövetség (Bouquet Association) was a well-organised national network with ample funding; through its village participants it accessed a vast heritage of folk art that would otherwise likely have been completely and irrevocably lost. It also published newspapers.

By the 1940s the movement broadened folk art into a more complex, community-building genre in which folk theatre played a prominent role. Historians date the end of Gyöngyösbokréta to 1944, though the association continued existing in a limited form until 1948. Throughout its entire existence, the Gyöngyösbokréta was responsible for at least 200 folk shows and performances of traditional customs by villagers from up to 100 townships.

=== Táncház ===
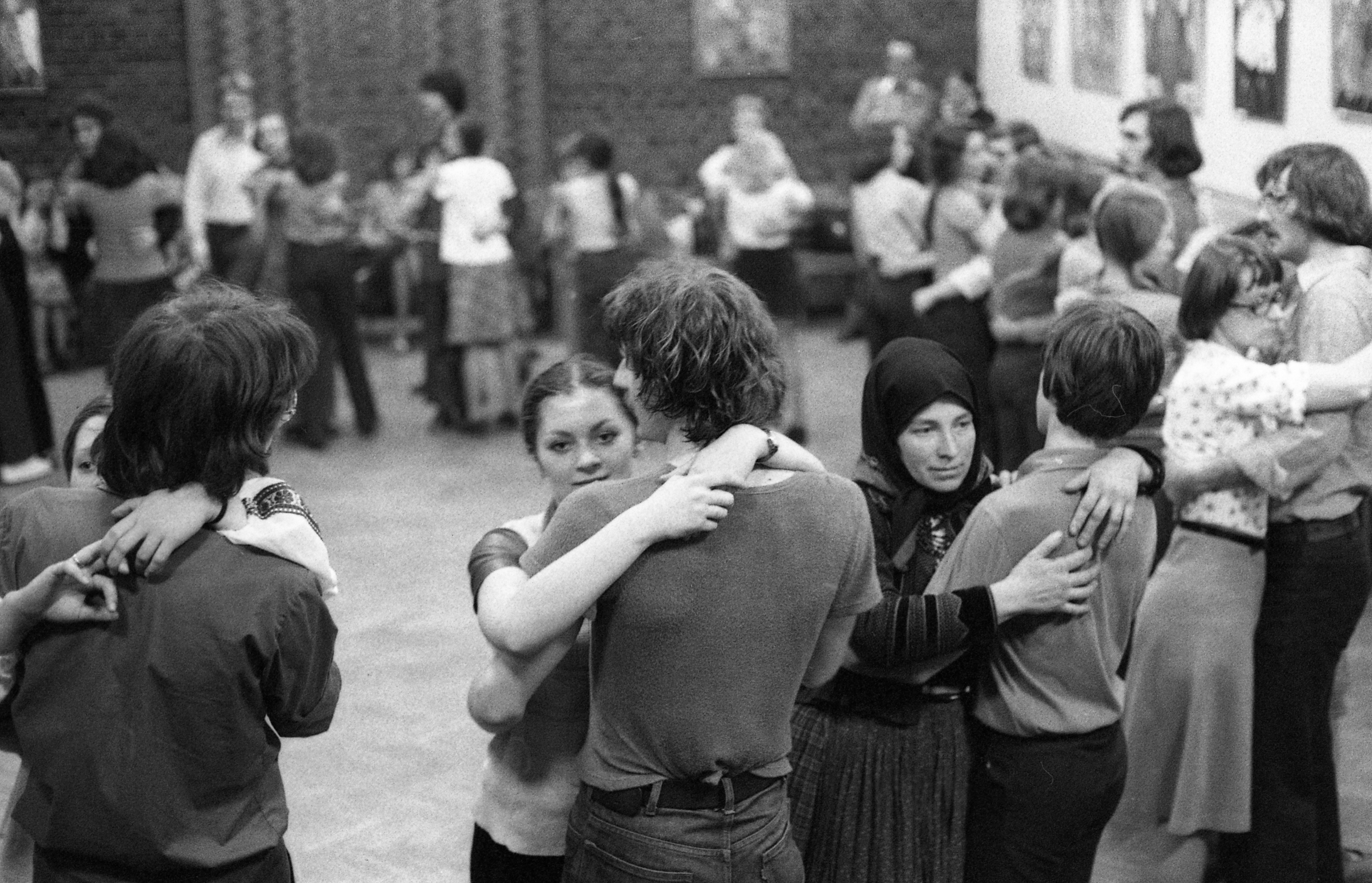
A dance house in Budapest, 1976.

The táncház (“dance house”) is a public event where people gather to learn and dance Hungarian folk dances, usually to live music. It is based on, and named after, the practice in the village of Szék, where traditional dance houses were held regularly. The first modern urban dance houses were held in 1972, and the format quickly gained popularity. Dance houses are both educational and entertaining, playing an important role in the proliferation of folk dancers and in the communal bonding of dance ensembles outside of festivals and stage performance.

Sándor Timár, with help from György Martin, developed a pedagogical method for teaching authentic folk dances at dance houses, allowing for personal expression and improvisation while grounding practice in collections of authentic dances. This "Táncház method" has since been placed on the UNESCO Register of Good Safeguarding Practices. An estimated 50 dance houses are held weekly in Hungary, supplemented by 80–100 dance camps per year, though the unreported count may be higher.

=== Stage performance ===
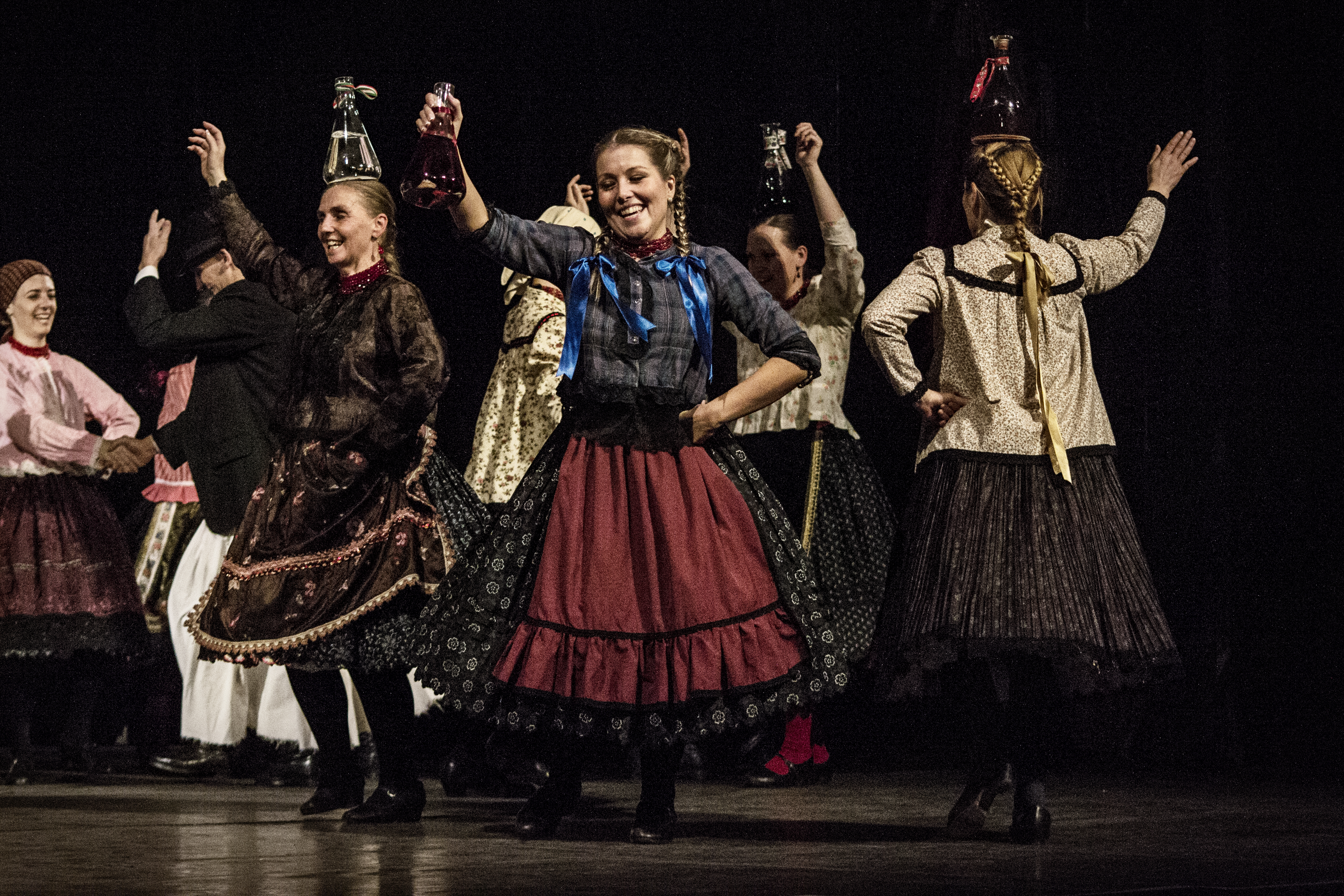
Women dancing with bottles during a performance.

The popularisation of stage renditions and shows of Hungarian folk dances began in the 1930s as a result of the Gyöngyösbokréta movement, though records of sporadic performances do appear between the 16th and 19th centuries. After the Second World War, professional folk dance ensembles were established with state support, though their performances reflected the politics of the era, utilizing folk dances in a stylized fashion only as set dressing to the wider artistic performance. After the 1960s, emphasis shifted gradually towards authentic choreographies and productions, enabled by extensive collections and research.

Today, folk dances are performed by amateur and professional ensembles at festivals, competitions and shows. Portrayals range from authentic to theatrical or stylised. Folk dance performance has been featured in media since the 1960s; notably, the televised competition Fölszállott a páva (The Peacock Has Taken Flight) enjoyed major popularity and sparked widespread public and academic discussion.

Most stage performances are characterized by their reflections on the past; through the usage of props, sets and costumes they reflect an idyllic village setting, creating an environment that refers to a specific moment in the past, to a particular cultural group, dance repertoire, performance style, and way of life.

== Collection ==
Systematic, modern collections of Hungarian folk dances began in the late 1920s, greatly aided by the Gyöngyösbokréta movement, and have continued up to the present day. Even in the early period, considerable efforts were made to capture authentic folk dances using film cameras, detailed textual descriptions, and later Labanotation. Most collections were created during field trips to villages by ethnochoreologists, who documented the dances of authentic performers who acquired their dance culture under traditional circumstances. Today, these collections are valuable not only to folk dance enthusiasts but also for research by ethnographers.

One of the largest and most significant collections is the Archives of Traditional Dances of the Research Centre for the Humanities Institute for Musicology, part of the Hungarian Academy of Sciences. The dance archive—part of which is accessible online—contained, as of 2016, 700 hours of footage on approximately 400,000 meters of negative, positive, and reversal prints, preserving dances by more than 10,000 dancers from 1,500 localities. Other important parts of the archives include the Dance Photograph Collection (39,500 photo negatives), several hundred thousand pages of documents in the Manuscript Collection, approximately 1,500 items notated with Labanotation or textually in the Dance Notation Collection (comprising about 35 hours of dance material), more than 13,000 items in the Motif Collection, and about 1,500 verses in the Collection of Dance Rhymes.

Additional resources include the Mozdulatokba vésett gyökerek (Roots Carved into Movements) project, which contains 2,557 photographs, 251 hours of sound recordings, and 634 hours of video recordings, 203 hours of which are available online; and the Folklore Database, which catalogues folklore recordings from 1,472 unique locations, compiled from contributions by 639 collectors and contributors. The Folk Music Collection of the Institute for Musicology is also notable, comprising approximately 20,000 hours of audio recordings, a large percentage of which are available online.

== Bibliography ==
- Viski, Károly (1937). Hungarian Dances (PDF). Translated by Sweetland, Sydney H. Budapest: Athenaeum Ltd.
- Martin, György (1974). Hungarian Folk Dances. Hungary: Corvina Press. ISBN 9780800215187.
- Rearick, Elizabeth Charlotte (1939). Dances of the Hungarians. New York: Teachers college, Columbia university.
- Nigel, Allenby Jaffé (1990). Folk Dance of Europe. Folk Dance Enterprises. ISBN 0946247145.
- Pesovár, Ernő (2003). Tánchagyományunk történeti rétegei: A magyar néptánc története [The historical layers of our dance tradition: The history of hungarian folk dance] (PDF) (in Hungarian). Szombathely: Berzsenyi Dániel Főiskola. ISBN 9789639290846.
- Kovács, Henrik (2021). A néptánc társadalmi funkcióváltozásai [Changes in the social function of folk dance] (PDF) (in Hungarian). Debrecen: DE Néprajzi Tanszék. ISBN 9789634902713.
- Fügedi, János; Vavrinecz, András, eds. (2013). Régi magyar táncstílus: Az ugrós: Antológia [Old Hungarian Dance Style: The Ugrós: An Anthology] (PDF). Budapest: L'Harmattan Kiadó; MTA BTK Zenetudományi Intézet. ISBN 978-963-236-488-9.
- Székely, Anna (2024). Közösség és Autenticitás: A kortárs magyar néptáncos revival mozgalom vizsgálata [Community and authenticity: An examination of the contemporary hungarian folk dance revival movement] (PDF) (PhD thesis) (in Hungarian). Szeged: University of Szeged.
