= Temuraga =

"Temürağa"

Song

from the album Taner Tanışman & Traditional Folk Dance
- Language: Turkish
- Genre: Bar or Kasik Havasi
- Songwriter: Unknown

Temuraga (Turkish: Temürağa),Tamour agha (Թամուր աղա), is a form of the Anatolian folk dance bar (dance) or Kasik Havasi.Temuraga is a folk dance spread all over Eastern Anatolia region. There are similar folkloric dance tunes known as Çek deveci develeri engine in the Burdur.

External videos
- Turkish
- Armenian diaspora
- Çek Deveci
- Sümer Ezgü - Çek deveci
- Canan Çal - Çek Deveci - Ege'ye Kalan © 2015 Kalan Müzik
- Taner Tanışman - Temirağa (Davul & Zurna)
