= Konyali =

External videos
- Η ΒΡΑΚΑ - Αννα Καραμπεσίνη, Εφη Σαρρή
- Konyalım Zehra Bilir - Taş Plak Kaydı
- 03 ΑΡΧΙΣΕ ΤΟ ΑΧΕΙΛΑΚΙ ΜΟΥ - Μαρμαρινάκι μου - Μορφωτικός Πολιτιστικός Σύλλογος Αμμουλιανής
- Stelios Kazantzidis - Hani Benim Elli Dirhem Pastırmam (Konyalı) [Official Audio]
- Λαική αγορά Εσκενάζυ Ρόζα (Κόνιαλής-Konyalim)

Konyali (Turkish: Konyalı, lit. from Konya; Greek: Κόνιαλι) is a Turkish folkloric tune, song, and dance, mainly in the form of kaşık havası. The meter is 4/4. The makam is hüseyni. It is a part of Turkish as well as Greek culture, specifically that of the Karamanlides, Cappadocian Greeks, Pontians, and other sub-groups. There are similar folkloric dance tunes known as η βράκα in Cyprus.

== See also ==
- Kaşık Havası
- Ballos
- Syrtos
- Lamba Da Şişesiz Yanmaz Mı
