= Carabinier (dance) =

- Native name: Karabinye
- Etymology: Named after French Rifle Regiment
- Genre: Haitian Folk Dance
- Origin: Haiti
- Related dances: Kontradans, Kongo rite dances, Twoubadou

The carabinier (Haitian Creole: Karabinye, English: carabineer) is a traditional cultural dance from Haiti that originated back to the time of the Haitian Revolution deriving from a section of the kontradans that is said to have evolved into the méringue or mereng (Haitian Creole) dance.

== Origins ==
Just after the Revolution of 1804, European figure dances (contredanse, lancers, and the quadrille), accompanied by Kongo influences (chica, banboula and the kalenda), hybridized into a couples dance named after the Carabiniers rifle regiments in the Haitian army.
