= Ludovic Lamothe =

Haitian composer and virtuoso pianist

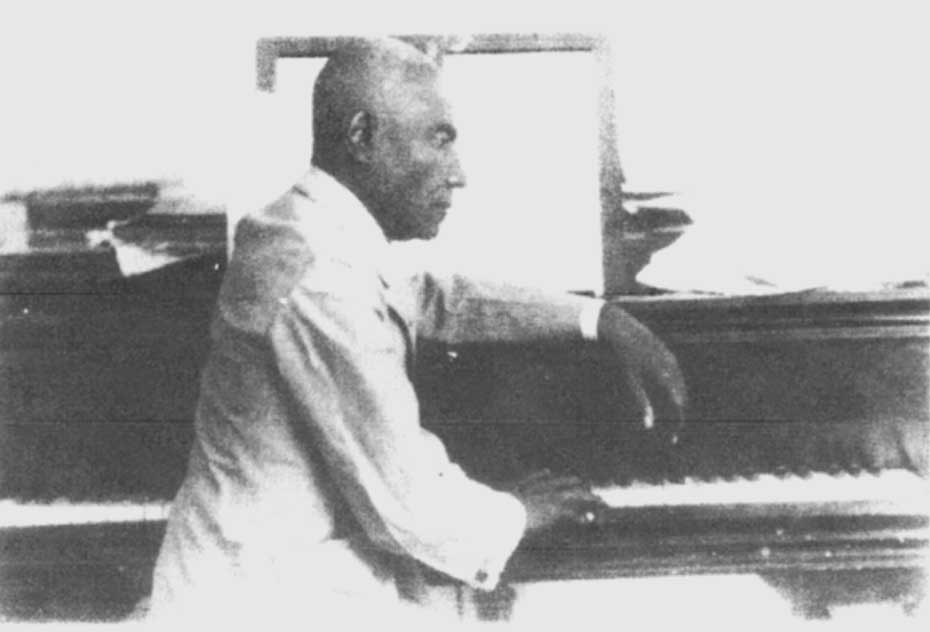
Ludovic Lamothe

Ludovic Lamothe (12 May 1882 - 4 April 1953) was a Haitian composer and virtuoso pianist. He is considered one of Haiti's most important classical composers.

== Biography ==
=== Early life ===
A native of Port-au-Prince, he was born into a distinguished literary family, and both his parents were pianists. His grandfather, Joseph Lamothe, was also a noted instrumentalist. Lamothe had his first lessons from his mother and studied the piano and clarinet at the Institution Saint Louis de Gonzague in his native Port-au-Prince where he exhibited exceptional technical and compositional abilities from a young age. In 1910, German merchants in Haiti recognised his talents and funded a scholarship for him to go and continue his studies in Paris, France. There he would study under Louis Diemer at the Paris Conservatory.

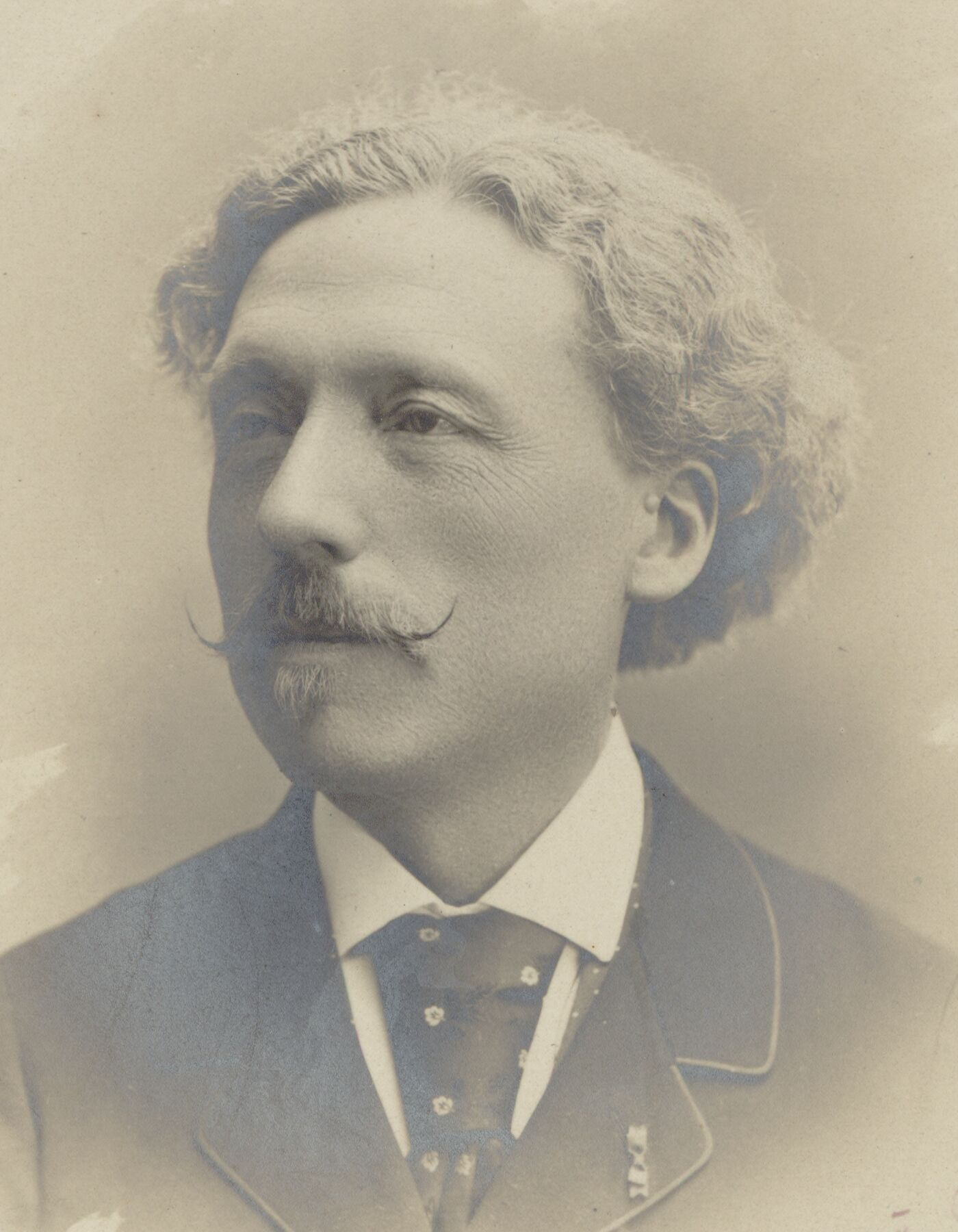
Louis Diémer, Lamothe's mentor in Paris

Lamothe returned to Haiti in 1911, remaining there for the rest of his life; he taught and gave private recitals on the piano in his home. He gained a reputation for reciting the works of Frédéric Chopin, his favourite composer, and he became known as the "Black Chopin", particularly amongst music scholars and middle-upper-class men in Haiti. On one instance Lamothe was invited to perform an event at the Rex Theatre named “Un Chopin Noir” (A Black Chopin) to commemorate the anniversary of the death of Frédéric Chopin. Lamothe recited, among others, Chopin's Polonaise in A Flat.

=== Compositions ===
As a composer, Lamothe wrote exclusively for his own instrument, and became known especially for his songs and short piano pieces. Lamothe's repertoire included a range of méringue, from the most formal, elite-oriented forms to the méringue of the low orders. He was not only influenced by traditional European classical music, but he was influenced by local traditions including Haitian Vodou ceremonial music and carnivals and Haitian peasant culture and influences which reflected a shared African heritage. One scholar has described Lamothe's repertoire as "predominantly classical in form, but creole in inspiration. Another musical scholar, Claude Carré of the online magazine Boutoures has described Lamothe as "representing the nationalist movement in Haitian classical music" and being "an emblematic figure, a piano virtuoso and a performer of Chopin, who left us a number of important compositions for piano."

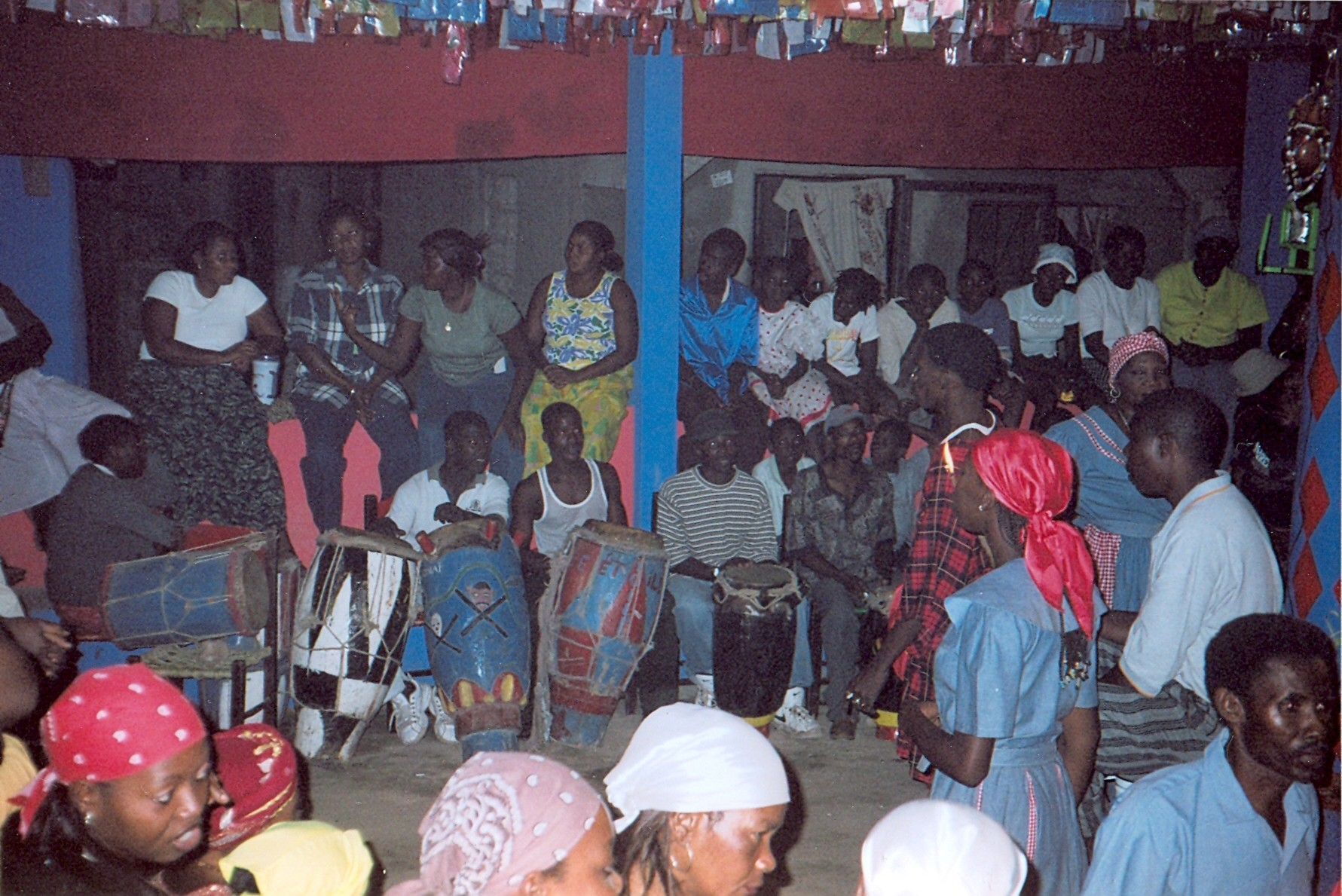
Lamothe's drew upon influences from Haitian vodou ceremonial music in his compositions

His fusion of styles and class influences in his music were regarded by scholars as reducing the polarisation in classes in Haiti in the early to mid-twentieth-century Haiti and giving them a unique shared identity through a musical spectrum. One of his notable works is entitled, La Dangereuse, a slow tempo piece with gentle, restrained dynamics, was warmly received by the Haitian aristocracy.

In 1934, Lamothe won a Port-au-Prince city council competition for his "Carnival méringue", which he entitled Nibo. Well received by all walks of society in Haiti, Nibo became known as a Liberation Anthem. a piece to mark the withdrawal of American forces from Haiti in August of that year.

=== Later life and post-recognition ===
Later in life, Lamothe encountered some serious financial problems, largely due to the fact he had not published many works internationally, only two, and even those were limited to Berlin and Paris, so he was not generating enough income to sustain a living. On 9 February 1944, he was forced to sell up his home that he had lived in much of his life, but his continued musical status amongst the elite in Haiti meant that enough money was raised to aid him in buying a new home.

Lamothe later went on to become Chief of Music of the Republic of Haiti. He died in Port-au-Prince in 1953. Although little of his music was published even in his native Haiti during his life, after his death his family collected his manuscripts and had them printed privately. A collection of his pieces was published in Port-au-Prince in 1955, entitled simply, Musique de Ludovic Lamothe.

In 2001, a CD recording titled A Vision of Ludovic Lamothe was published on the IFA Music Records label, featuring some of his pieces, including the Ballade in A Minor, Danza No. 1 (La Habanera), Evocation, and Danse Espagnole No. 4, performed by Latino-Caribbean pianist, Charles P. Phillips.

In 2006, a book entitled Vodou Nation: Haitian Art Music and Cultural Nationalism authored by Michael Largey (referenced by the Chicago Studies in Ethnomusicology) cited numerous examples of Lamothe's compositions to illustrate his cultural contribution to Vodou music. They cited in particular, La Dangereuse, Nibo, Sous la Tonnelle, Loco and Sobo.
