= Zhuravel =

Zhuravel (Belarusian: Журавель, Ukrainian: Журавель) is a Ukrainian and Belarusian surname from a nickname meaning "crane" in both languages. Notable people with the name include:

- Tony Zhuravel (1963), Belarusian contemporary artist
- Uladzimir Zhuravel (1971–2018), Belarusian football player and coach
