= Trasucha =

Type of dance

- Native name: Трасуха
- Genre: Folk dance
- Origin: Belarus

Trasucha (Belarusian: Трасуха) is an ancient Belarusian folk dance, which according to Kasyan Goleizovsky, was the prototype of the polka.

== See also ==
- Metelitsa
