= Lánytánc =

The lánytánc is a Hungarian folk dance similar to the karikázó in that it is a women's circle dance in 4/4 time. It is performed to instrumental rather than vocal music.
