= Hacha'a =

Iraqi dance style

Hach'a, also written as Hacha or Hachaa or Hechea (from Iraqi Arabic هَچَع meaning "lying down"), with or without the Arabic definite article Al- or El-, is an Iraqi folk poetic, musical, and dance performance style (tawr). This tradition originated in northern and central Iraq (Samarra, Mosul, Tikrit) and spread to southern Iraq after World War I, where it became especially popular in the Roma (Kawliya) community, which is also the name of the accompanying dance.

== The poetry ==
Hacha'a poetry, also known as Tajleebah (from Arabic تجليبة), comes from the Arabic root j-l-b (ج-ل-ب), meaning "to drag" or "to turn over," referring to the classic opening line "I turn you over, oh night, a thousand times" (لاجلبنك يا ليلي الف تجليبة). It is composed in the Hazaj poetic meter. The earliest known poet in this style is Hasan al-Alqawi, who composed in the Salah al-Din region in the mid-19th century during the Ottoman period. Hacha'a poetry describes the suffering of love. The audience hand-claps and interjects verbally with "hacha'a" at the end of each verse as a rhythmic refrain, meaning to lie down, in an encouragement to be finally rid of all the suffering by lying down, whether alone or with the loved one.

== The music ==
Hacha'a is a rhythmic performance style (tawr) of Iraqi folk music, rather than a melodic mode (Maqam). The most distinctive sound is that of the drum known as Khishba, Zanboor or Kasour, which has a narrow tube-shaped body made of wood, with a fish-skin head glued on top. The head is moistened and the drum is struck rapidly with both hands to produce a fast-paced roll characteristic of the style, many beats faster than the main beat of the song. Iraqi traditional or modern musical instruments can be used. The genre gained mainstream recognition through singer Zuhour Hussein and her recording of "Al-Hajaa" in the mid-20th century.

== The dance ==
The Hach'a accompanying dance is an expressive dance that emphasizes complex movements of the hands and neck, with some hip movements. This dance is a solo or group dance for women mostly, with sometimes a male drummer who dances circling the women. There are special moves for women with longer hair since they can swing and flail their hair around wildly in the dance.

The Hacha'a dance is also known as:

- the Agraba, from the Arabic عقربة which means scorpion because of the perceived similarities between this dance's moves and how the Iraqi scorpion moves.
- the Kawliya dance because of its association with the Iraqi Roma community.

Features of the Hach'a dance style include:

- Hair swinging: The dancer's untied hair is thrown circularly in the air around her and also right and left, violently to the drum rhythms.
- Hair sweeping: The dancer kneels closer to the floor and rubs her hair, gently sweeping the floor with it.
- Awakening the earth (foot-stomping): The dancer repeatedly jumps and strikes the floor with her feet, reminiscent of ancient Mesopotamian earth fertility rites. Folklorists link this movement and hair sweeping to Mesopotamian fertility rites associated with Inanna and Tammuz.
- Shimmies: Rapid shaking motion of the head, shoulders and hips.
- Daggers: Sometimes the dancer holds a dagger in each hand and gestures as if stabbing her heart and sides, signifying the pain of love and separation.
- Finger snaps: Two-handed finger snaps are commonly used.
- Costumes: The typical costume is a much less conservative version of a traditional Iraqi village girl costume, with some decoration.

== See also ==
- Arabic poetry
- Music of Iraq
- Ethnic, regional, and folk dances of Iraq
