= Turkish Cypriot folk dances =

Turkish Cypriot folk dances are dances that have been passed down through Turkish Cypriot culture.

== International membership ==
Northern Cyprus became a member of Federation of International Dance Festivals (FIDAF) in 2014.

== Types of Turkish Cypriot folk dances ==
=== Zeibekiko ===
Zeibekiko: Zeibekiko or Zeybekiko (Greek: Ζεϊμπέκικο) is a Turkic folk dance with a rhythmic pattern of 9/4 or 11/8.

== See also ==
- Greek dances
- Sirto
- Tamzara
- Kochari
- Horon
- Halay
- Turkish dance
