= Tarakama (dance) =

Terekeme and Azerbaijani folk dance

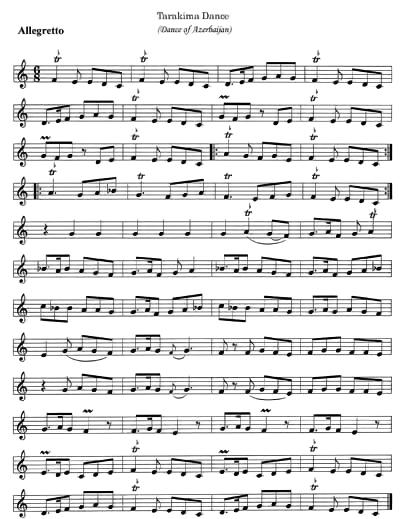

Tarakama or Terekeme (Azerbaijani: Tərəkəmə) is an Terekeme and Azerbaijani rhythmic folk dance.

== Etymology ==
Terekeme is the name of a tribe that settled in the caucasus during the late middle ages. The dance was originated by the Terekeme people. There are two types of Terekeme dance with the same melody. It is mainly performed on weddings and holidays, and with the zurna instrument.

== Stamps ==
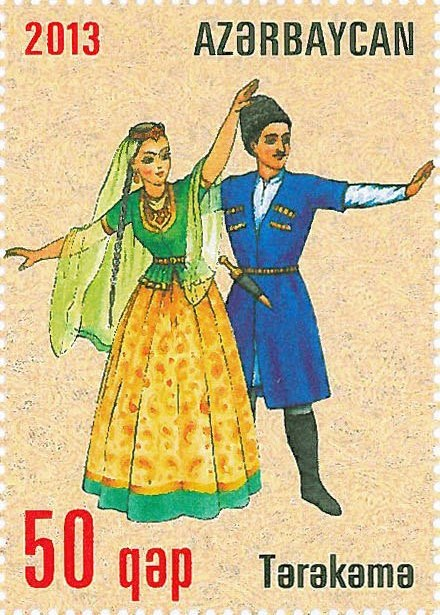
Stamp of Azerbaijan, 2013

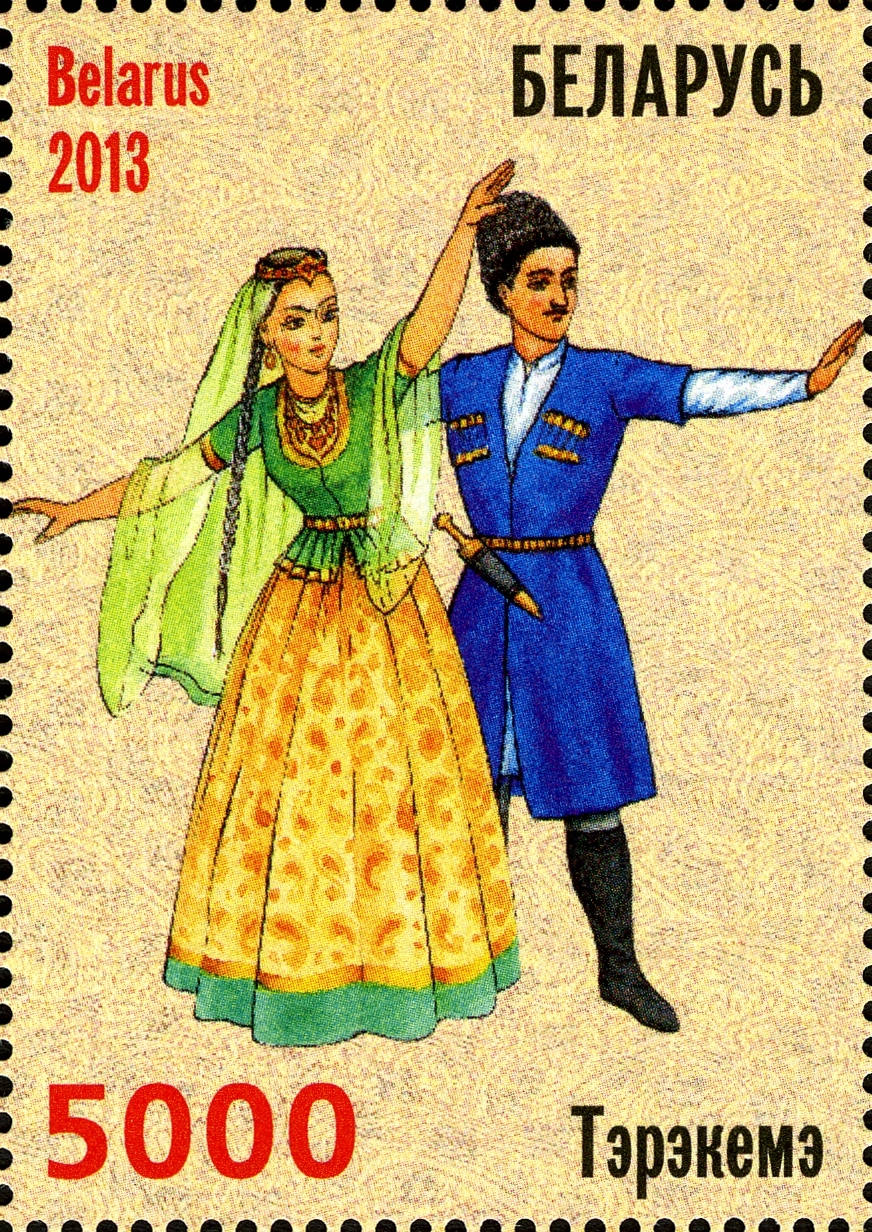
Stamp of Belarus, 2013
