= Tony Zhuravel =

Belarusian artist (born 1963)

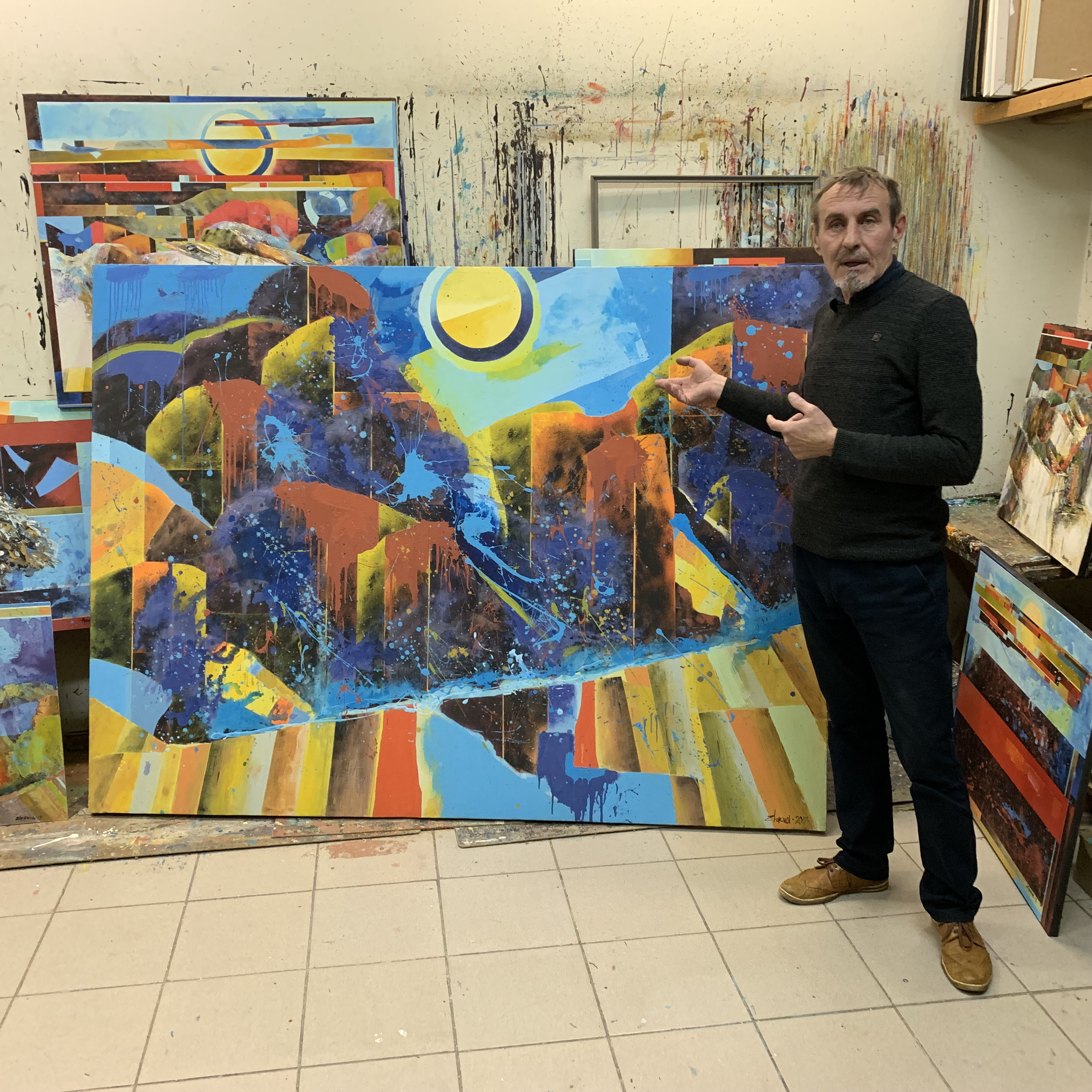
- Tony Zhuravel at his studio
- Born: 19 March 1963 (age 63); Orsha, Belarus
- Education: Belarusian State Academy of Arts
- Occupation: Painter
- Movement: Impressionism, Cubism, pop art

Tony Zhuravel (Russian: Журавлёв Анатолий Петрович; born 19 March 1963), alternatively known as Anatoly Zhuravel, is a Belarusian contemporary artist. In 1997, he became a member of Belarusian Union of Artists.

== Art development ==
Zhuravel's painting style incorporates a layering effect, interleaving textures and, blending colour to create a subjective atmosphere within his imagery. He uses unpredictable palettes, a spectrum of colour which became a distinctive attribute of his work. His abstract western landscapes experiment with this concept of the horizon; austere western prairie bonded with a shifting sky. His works often depict western prairies with shifting skies, emphasising layered colour and intricate atmospheric effects. All the consequences of an unaffected invention that results from intuitive strokes on the canvas.

== Paintings ==
In 2009, Zhuravel represented Belarus at Venice Bienalle – The most famous and ambitious abstract painting in which Zhuravel exemplified his free-expressionist techniques is “August”. Zhuravel and Alex Salaueu are prominent representatives of the Vitebsk Art School, founded by Marc Chagall and Kazimir Malevich.

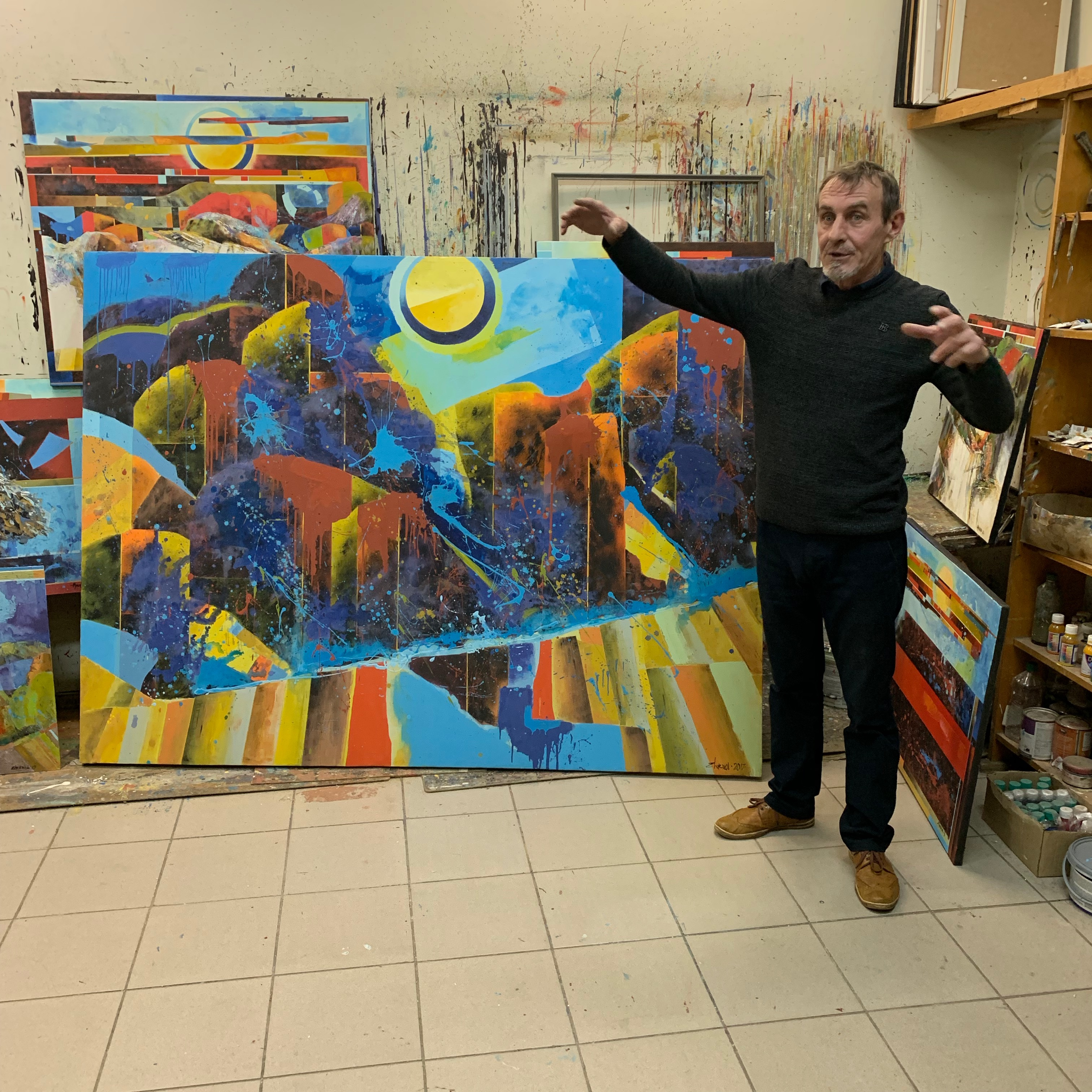
Tony Zhuravel at his studio, 2019

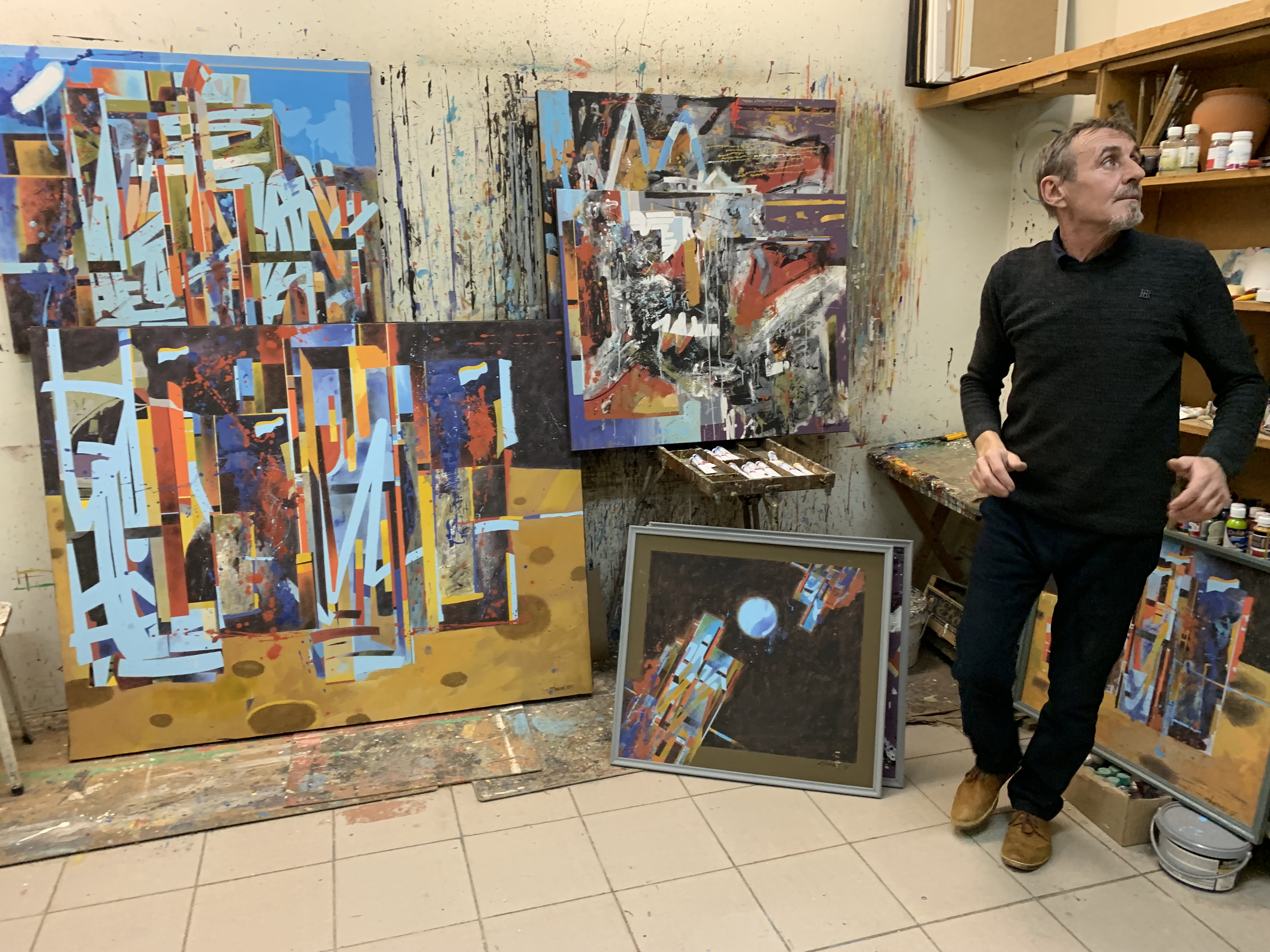
Tony Zhuravel at his studio, 2019

== Honours ==
1992, 1998 - awarded the Grand Prix in the category "Painting and Tapestry" at the exhibition of visual arts "ART-MARK", Moscow. Vitebsk.

1998 - Grand Prix of the Republican exhibition “Time. Space. Personality ".

1998 - First UN Prize in the Sustainable Development of the World nomination.

== Collections ==
Zhuravel's works are held in the following public collections:

- Belarusian National Arts Museum, Minsk
- Belarusian Union of Artists
- Tretyakov Gallery, Moscow
- Museum of Modern Art, Mogilev

== Bibliography ==
1. Anatol Zhuravel // Sayuz creatorў [Vyyaylenchy material] = A Union of creators: photo album / style. і аўт. tekstu M. Tsybulski; aut. ledge. W. Andreichanka; fat. V. Balotsina, M. Tsybulskaga. - Mn. : Belarus, 2005. - P. 50. - To Belarus. і English movah.
2. Tsybulsky, M. L. Zhuravlev Anatoly Petrovich / M. L. Tsybulsky // Regions of Belarus: encyclopedia. : in 7 volumes / editorial board: T. V. Belova (chief editor) [and others]. - Mn. : Belarus. Entsykl. Name P. Broeki, 2010. - T. 2: Vitebsk region. Book. 1. - P.432.
3. Gatoskaya, L. "Svetabudova Zhuraўlya" / L. Gatuskaya // Arshanskaya newspaper. - 2004 .-- 10 red. - S. 7.
4. Kalenik, A. Zhuraўliny susvet / A. Kalenik // Polatsk spring. - 2009 .-- 3 sak. - S. 7.
5. Machkova, V. "The Universe of the Crane" / V. Machkova // Telecom Express (Orsha). - 2010 .-- Apr 15. - S. 30.
6. Pavlova, E. "March cats" / E. Pavlova // Vitebsk courier. - 2005 .-- March 25. - S. 8.
7. Solovyova, T. The Universe of the Crane / T. Solovyova // Vitebsk Prospect. - 2008 .-- Dec 18. - S. 3.
8. Fragments of life // Inform Plus (Polotsk). - 2009 .-- Feb 26. - S. 4.
