= Kikkli =

Punjabi folk dance

Kikli
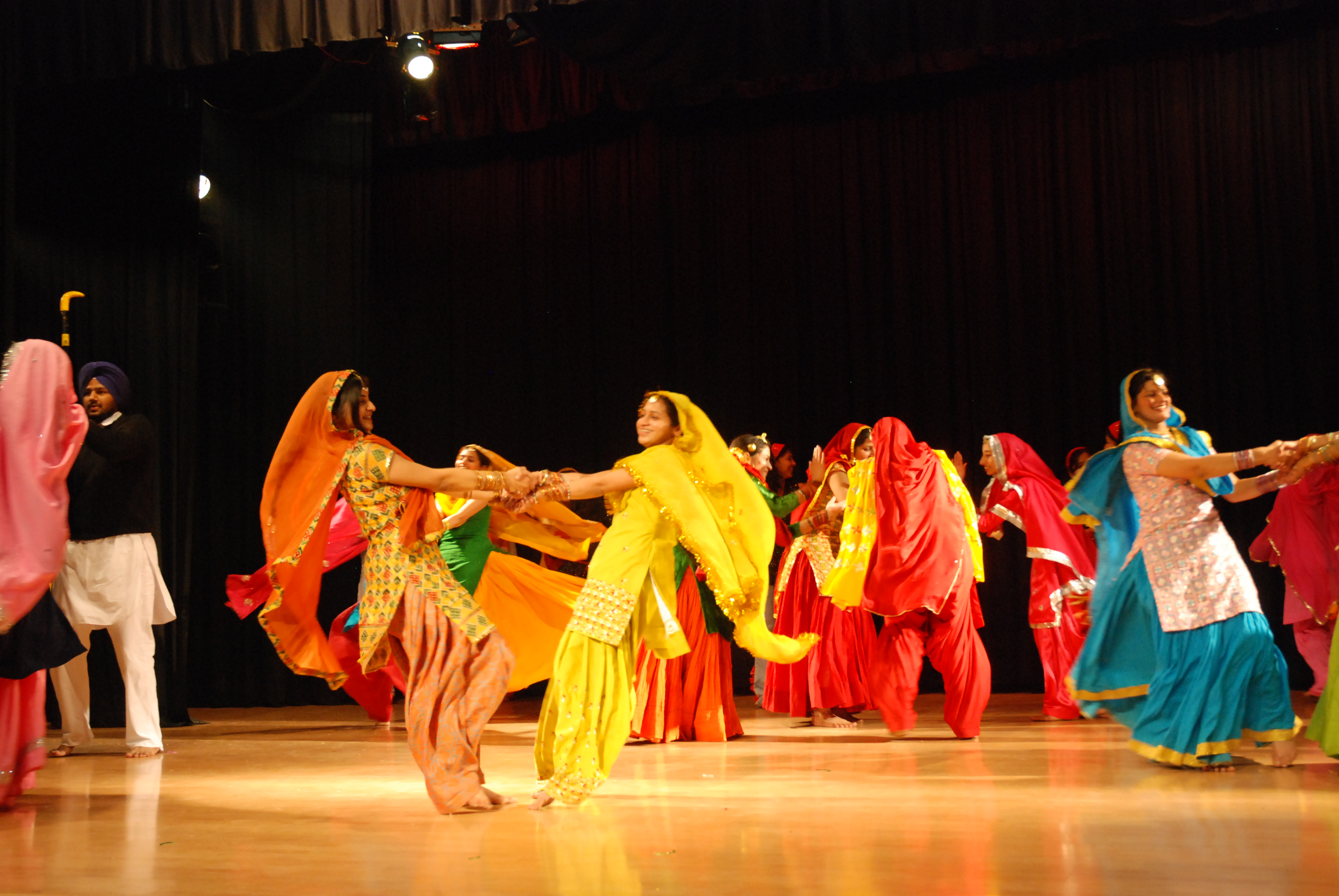
- Genre: Folk dance
- Origin: Punjab

Kikkli (pronounced: kick-lee), also spelled as Kikli, is one of the folk dances of Punjabi women and girls performed by two girls holding hands and twirling each other in circle and balancing their positions in circular motions. It is generally popular in young girls and performed in pairs. A variety of songs are used with clapping.

== Dancing style ==
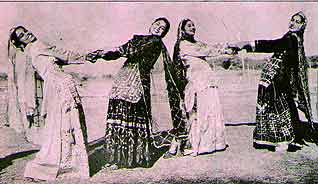
Photograph of Punjabi women performing 'Kikkli', a traditional Punjabi folk dance

It is more of a sport than a dance for young girls. Two girls stand face to face close to each other and hold their hands crossing arms with their bodies inclined back; in this position their arms are stretched to the maximum and hands interlock firmly. Then they wheel round fast continuously with their dupattas floating in the air and anklets making tinkling sound. The other ladies encourages them to go faster and faster by singing songs with clapping. Sometimes it is done by four girls. The folk song related to the dance has much variety.

== See also ==
- Fugdi
