= Pleskač =

Pleskač (Czech feminine: Pleskačová; Cyrillic: Плескач; Pleskach) is a Slavic family name.

Notable people with the surname include:

- Hana Pleskačová (born 1966), Czechoslovak sprint canoer
- Svetlana Styrkina (m. Svetlana Pleskach-Styrkina; born 1949), Belarusian-born Soviet athlete

"Pleskachova" may also be the feminine form of the Russian surname Pleskachov (Cyrillic: Плескачёв; alt. sp.: Pleskachev; Russian feminine: Pleskachova or Pleskacheva).

- Lidia Pleskachova (born 2010), Russian figure skater
