= Méringue =

Music genre and national symbol in Haiti

- Cultural origins: Mid-19th century, Haiti
- Typical instruments: Guitar; bass; tanbou; congas; saxophone; piano; cowbell; horns; trombone; trumpet
- Derivative forms: Cadence rampa; compas; mini-jazz; twoubadou; zouk; cadence-lypso; coladeira; soca

Regional scenes
- North America (esp. Haiti, Guadeloupe, Martinique, Dominica, Saint Lucia, Canada and Panama); France; Africa (esp. Cape Verde and Angola); South America (esp. Brazil); Portugal

Méringue (French pronunciation: [meʁɛ̃ɡ]; Haitian Creole: mereng), also called méringue lente or méringue de salon (slow or salon méringue), is a dance music and national symbol in Haiti. It is a string-based style played on the guitar, horn section, piano, and other string instruments unlike the accordion-based merengue, and is generally sung in Haitian Creole and French, as well as in English and Spanish.

== History ==
Méringue was heavily influenced by the contredanse from Europe and then by Afro-Caribbean influences from Hispaniola. The blend of African and European cultures has created popular dance music, music played on simple acoustic instruments by artists who don't need theaters or microphones to show off their art. The term meringue, a whipped egg and sugar confection popular in eighteenth-century France, was adopted presumably because it captured the essence of the light nature of the dance where one gracefully shifts one's weight between feet in a very fluid movement, animating the final section of the Haitian kontradans. It is said that the carabinier, a dance from Haiti originating back to the time of the Haitian Revolution, combined European dances accompanied by Kongo influences, deriving from a section of kontradans and is said to have evolved into the méringue. However, like almost all Latin American dances, the méringue can trace its origins back to the contredanse; the French dance that was hugely popular in Europe and the creolization of it by the use of the drums, poetic song, antiphonal song form, and imitations of colonial elite dance elements by the mulattos and the black slaves that had already begun to transform the genre.

== Origins ==
Méringue was claimed by both elite and proletarian Haitian audiences as a representative expression of Haitian cultural values. Elite Haitian composers, many of whom were trained in Europe and wrote in a European-influenced style, used the méringue as a vehicle for their creative talents. Composers such as Occide Jeanty; his father, Occilius; Ludovic Lamothe; Justin Elie; Franck Lassègue; and Fernand Frangeul wrote méringue for solo piano and sometimes for small groups of wind instruments. Often, these elite méringue were named for people-for example, François Manigat's Eight Days while Staying in Cap (Haïtien). The méringue is based on a five-note rhythm, or quintuplet, known in French as a quintolet and Spanish (from Cuba) as a cinquillo. The quintolet is unevenly subdivided, giving an appropriate feeling of "long-short-long-short-long." While the concert méringue tended to use the syncopated version, Haitian piano soloists, like Ludovic Lamothe, tended to play the quintolet more like five even pulses, giving the méringue a smoother, subtler feel. Occide Jeanty's Maria was written for the Musique du Palais, the official presidential band for the Haitian Republic. Jeanty was chief director and composer for the group and wrote most of the band's performance repertoire. The quintolet in "Maria" is the syncopated version, appearing first in the saxophones and horns, then answered by the flutes, clarinets, and trumpets. Most méringue for concert band followed this pattern, keeping the quintolet figure moving from low to high register, thus allowing the melody to alternate the méringue rhythm with sustained, heavily vibrated notes. The percussion parts also alternate the musical pulse and the quintolet rhythm, giving the méringue an additional lilt. Méringue were also used by proletarian audiences during Carnival time, especially in the nineteenth century. Unlike the elite méringue, intended for use on the dance floor, the Carnival méringue were directed at the elite members of Haitian society, either criticizing unpopular people in power or ridiculing their idiosyncrasies. The formulaic insults of the Haitian Carnival méringue bore some similarity to the early calypso picong, or "stinging," style.

== Rhythm ==
A Kongo influence can be found in the persistent rhythmic figure that structured the melodies of the méringue, a syncopated five-beat pattern (often spoken as "dak-ta-dak-ta-dak") borrowed from the kata (time line) for the Vodou rhythm kongo and the rhythm used for carnival and rara bands, rabòday. The dance incorporated an emphasis on the gentle rolling of the hips seen in many Caribbean dances. In Haiti, this movement is sometimes called gouyad (verb from the French gouye, from the French grouiller, to move or stir) or mabouya, the name of the largest lizard on the island.

== Popular culture ==
Like many other Caribbean styles, méringue is played by artists who are usually anonymous and, although their music is very much alive, they tend to be called "traditional." Haïti Chérie is a song that brings together the best traditional méringue bands presenting a repertoire of mostly anonymous classics. A notable exception is a song called, Choucoune or commonly known as "Ti Zwazo", an old méringue with lyrics by Haitian poet Oswald Durand and set to music by Michel Mauléart Monton, also Haitian. Harry Belafonte popularized it internationally as Yellow Bird, and it is now often mistakenly presented as Jamaican mento.

== See also ==
- Compas
- Merengue (Dominican version)
- Mini-jazz
- Twoubadou
- Salsa music
