= Rudl =

Norwegian couples' folk dance

The rudl or rull is a western Norwegian couples' folk dance in 2/4 or 6/8 related to the Swedish snoa.
