= Metelitsa =

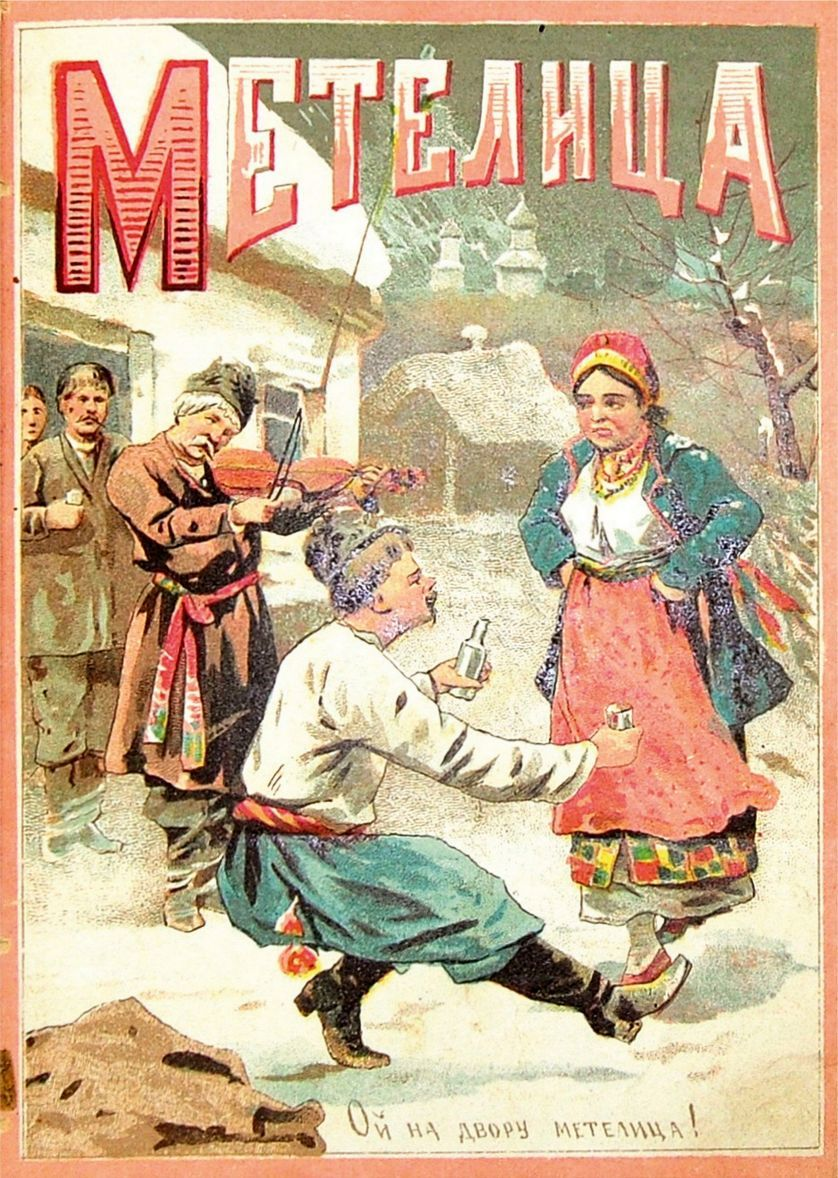
Metelitsa: A humorous depiction: Ukrainian Cossack is doing prisiadki

Metelitsa (Russian: метелица), metelytsia (Ukrainian: мeтeлиця) or miacielica (Belarusian: мяцеліца, завейніца) is a popular folk dance from Belarus, Russia and Ukraine. This dance abounds in swift changes of choreographed figures of a spinning nature, symbolizing a snowstorm. The dance still retains its Khorovod character, the ancient form of group dancing and choral singing with the many figures in a circle form. In the past the Metelystia was danced to only choral accompaniment. In the late 19th and early 20th century besides singing the song, it was accompanied by the violin or sometimes an instrumental ensemble.

== See also ==
- Ukrainian dance
