= Karikázó =

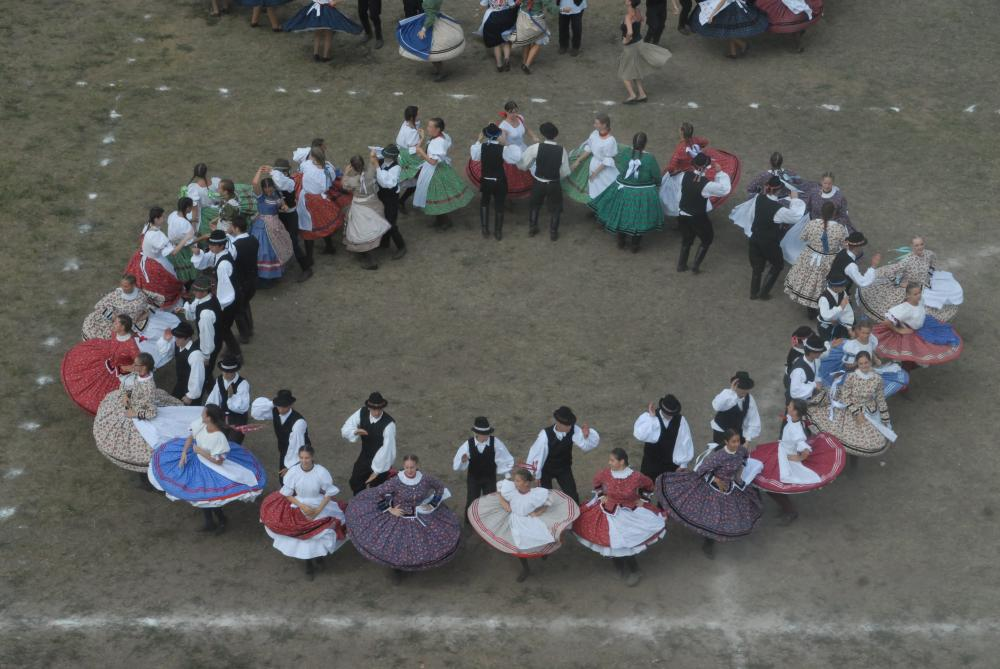

Karikázó is a Hungarian folk dance traditionally performed by women. It is a circle dance in 4/4 time, traditionally to a cappella rather than instrumental music.
