= Snoa (dance) =

Swedish couple dance

Snoa is a Swedish couple dance involving a simple pivot-spin step in 4/4 duple-meter time. It is related to the Norwegian rudl or rull dance, which is often in a 2/4 meter. The Swedish word Snoa, meaning "to turn or rotate", is used throughout a good part of northern Sweden to identify this dance.
