= Legényes =

Transylvanian men's dance

A legényes (in Hungarian) or feciorească (in Romanian) is a men's solo dance done by Transylvanian people (in Hungarian ethnic) living in the Kalotaszeg/Țara Călatei, Szilágyság/Sălaj and Mezőség/Câmpia Transilvaniei regions of Transylvania, roughly the region around Cluj. Although usually danced by young men, it can be also danced by older men. The dance is performed freestyle usually by one dancer at a time in front of the band. Women participate in the dance by standing in lines to the side and sing/shout verses while the men dance. Each lad does a number of points (dance phrases) typically 4 to 8 without repetition. Each point consists of 4 parts, each lasting 4 counts. The first part is usually the same for everyone (there are only a few variations). Almost every man had his own song, and they danced only for this song in their whole life.

== Styles ==
- legényes / feciorească (Kalotaszeg)
- sűrű tempó (Szék)
- sűrű magyar or sűrű fogásolás (Mezőség)
- pontozó / ponturi (Küküllő-mente)
- târnăveană or korcsos (Mezőség)
- figurázó (Szilágyság)

== See also ==
- Schuhplattler
