= Kolbastı =

Turkish dance

Kolbastı is a popular Turkish dance. It was originally created in the 1930s in the seaport of Giresun on the Black Sea coast of north-eastern Turkey. Loosely translated, 'kolbastı' means 'caught red-handed by the police.' According to legend, the name comes from nightly police patrols of the city to round up drunks, who made up a song with the lyrics: 'They came, they caught us, they beat us' (in Turkish: 'Geldiler, bastılar, vurdular'). In the past few years this dance has grown very popular and is spreading in popularity outside the region. These days this dance is mostly used for weddings or by youngsters who like to show off their energetic moves and attract girls.

A rise in the dances' popularity outside of Giresun has led to the belief that the dance disappeared from the region. However, it is still prevalent among youth to this day.

== See also ==
- The Melbourne shuffle, a similar dance style associated with the electronic music scene in Melbourne, Australia.
