= Kontradans =

Musical genre

Kontradans, or the French-Haitian Contredanse, is creolized dance music formed in the 18th century in the French colony of Saint-Domingue (Haiti) that evolved from the English contra dance, or (country dance), which eventually spread throughout the Caribbean, Louisiana, Europe and the rest of the New World from the Creoles of Saint-Domingue.

== History ==
The "contredanse," the French-renamed country dance as indicated in a 1710 dance book called Recuil de Contredance, began in the English courts and was imported to Haiti via France (Brittany) through colonial rule and had been incorporated with African influences in Saint-Domingue. Contredanse flourished as it took on this creolized form establishing strong traditions in Haiti that would later influence variant forms throughout the Caribbean.

== Origins ==
The usage of the drums, poetic song, antiphonal song form, and imitations of the colonial elite dance were the elements that had already begun to transform the contredanse.

== Evolution ==
A broad group of Saint-Domingue planters, along with their slaves that fled the Haitian Revolution resettled in the old Providence of Oriente in eastern Cuba, that began coffee production around the cities of Santiago and Guantanamo. This settlement provided an impetus of musical activities in those eastern areas. So, this creolized version of contredanse imported from Haiti would fuse with and reinforce the criolla over the next couple of decades. Rhythmic styles such as the tango, habanera, and the cinquillo became dominant patterns as new emerging styles and led to the development of the contradanza, and later in 1879, the danzón; a couples dance and is regarded as the first truly national dance genre of Cuba.

== Méringue ==
A five-note musical figure called quintolet (cinquillo in Cuba and the rest of the Spanish speaking Caribbean), became a chief feature to the kontradans and would figure prominently into the Haitian folk dance music called méringue (a whipped egg and sugar confection popular in 18th century France), presumably because it captured the essence of the light nature of the dance where one gracefully shifts their weight between feet in a very fluid movement, animating the final section of the Haitian kontradans.
