= Bar (dance) =

Folk dance of Eastern Turkey

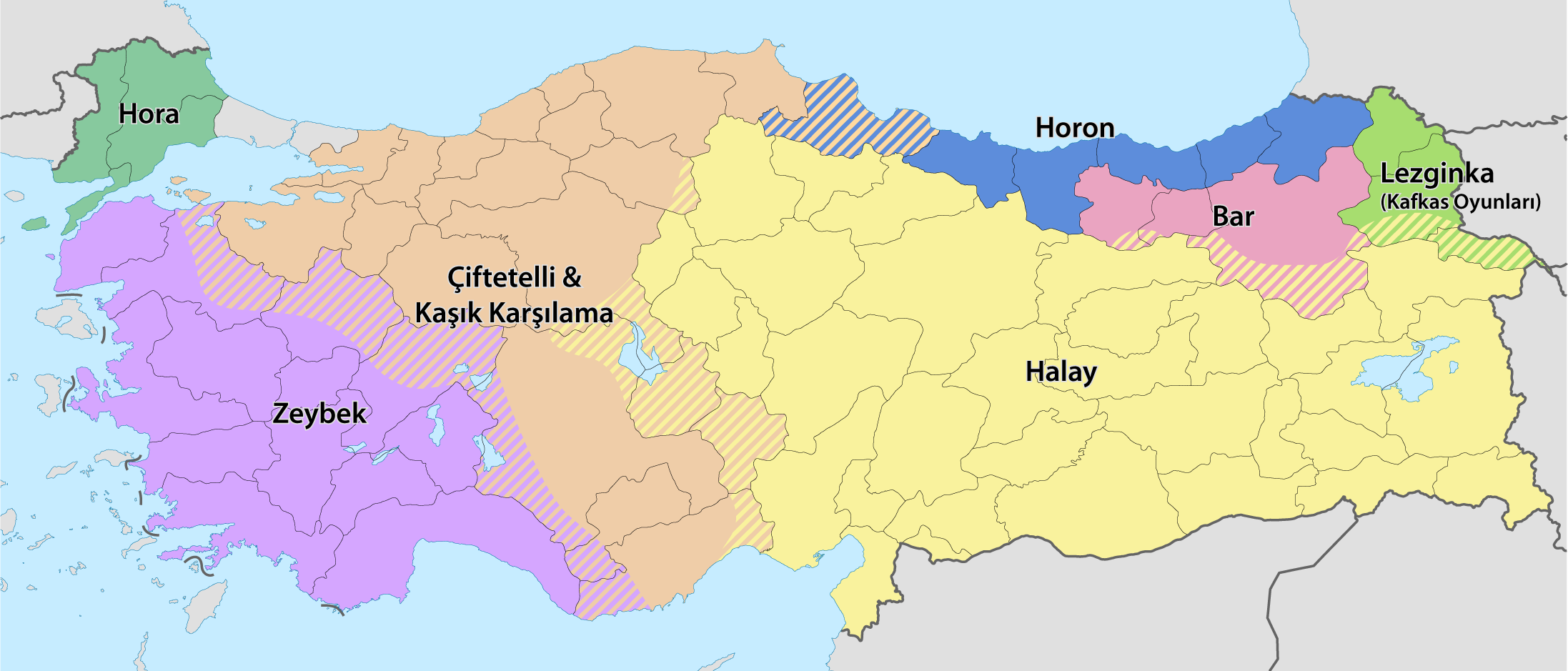
Extension and distribution of folk dances in today's Turkey

Bar is a Turkish folk dance from the Eastern Anatolia region of Turkey. The word bar is from the Armenian word "Պար" (bar) which means dance. With their structure and formation, they are the dances performed by groups in the open. They are spread, in general, all over the region of Eastern Anatolia, especially in Artvin, Ardahan, Erzurum, Bayburt, Ağrı, Kars, and Erzincan provinces. The characteristic of their formation is that they are performed side-by-side, hand, shoulder and arm-in-arm. Woman and man bars are different from one another. The principal instruments of bar dances are davul and zurna (shrill pipe). The dominant measures in bars are 5/8 and 9/8. Occasionally measures of 6/8 and 12/8 are also used. Aksak 9/8 measures which are the most characteristic measures, in particular, of the Turkish folk music are applied with extremely different and interesting structures in this dance. The Karapapakhs and Meskhetian Turks dance the folk dance.

A famous song of Bar is called 'Atabarı'.
