= Kaşık Havası =

Popular instrumental melody in Turkey

External videos
- RITMO FAZZANI
- Silifkenin Yoğurdu Oyun Havası

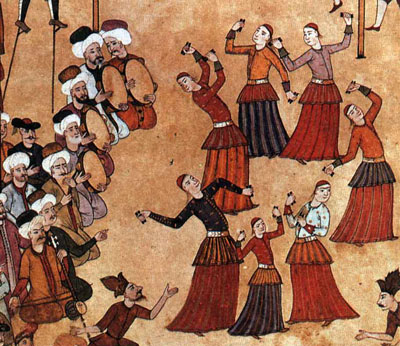
"Köçek troupe at a fair" at Sultan Ahmed's 1720 celebration of his son's circumcision. Miniature from the Surname-i Vehbi, Topkapı Palace, Istanbul.

Kaşık Havası (Turkish: Kaşık Havası, lit. spoon tune) or Kaşık Oyunları (Turkish: Kaşık Oyunları, lit. spoon dances; Greek: Χορός κουταλιών) are folk dances mostly spread over the Mediterranean region and have a varying structure of their arrangement, performance, rhythmic, and melodic characteristics. They are always rendered with wooden spoons and the characteristic measure is 2/4 or 4/4. The instruments used are beast bow (later violin), baglama and clarinet, in general, they are accompanied by folk songs.
