= Ukrainian dance =

Dance of various ethnic groups in Ukraine

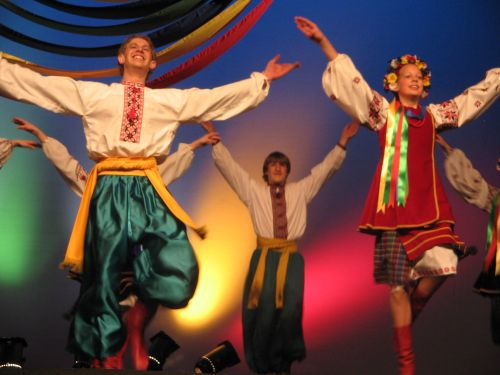
Ukrainians performing a Kavyryialochka dance figure

Ukrainian dance (Ukrainian: український тaнeць, romanized: ukrayinskyi tanets') mostly refers to the traditional folk dances of the Ukrainians as an ethnic group, but may also refer to dances originating from the multiple other ethnic groups within Ukraine.

A household folk dance is a folk dance that is done in a particular territory and is traditionally done under common circumstances like weddings or festivals, with characteristic movements, rhythms, costumes, etc.

A folk-stage dance, staged by a choreographer in a professional or amateur collective for performance on stage, may be Ukrainian, but is no longer an everyday folk dance.

The main dance genres of Ukrainians' folk dance are circle dance, as one of the oldest types of folk dance art, very typical to all Slavic dances, the performance of which is associated with calendar rites, and everyday dance, which includes metelitsa, hopak, kozachok, hutsulka, kolomyika, square dance, and polka.

== Pre-modern history ==
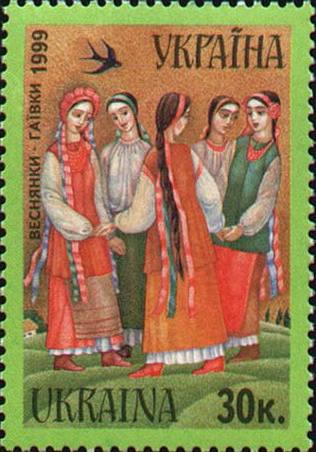
Vesnianka, a spring dance, on a Ukrainian post stamp

Judging by the figures depicted in motion on Trypillian clay vessels, dance has been performed in the lands of present-day Ukraine since at least the third millennium BC. It has been assumed that up to the introduction of Christianity in Kyivan Rus in 988, dance served a very important ritual function in the lands of present-day Ukraine. Pre-Christian rituals combined dance with music, poetry, and song. A remnant of these ritual dances (Ukrainian: Oбpядовi танці, translit. Obryadovi tantsi; see also Khorovody) which survive in limited form today are the Spring Dances, or Vesnianky, also referred to as Hahilky, Hayilky, Hayivky, Yahilky, or Rohulky. Another seasonal event featuring dances was the yearly pre-harvest festival of Kupalo, which to this day remains a favorite theme for Ukrainian choreographers.

These religious ritual dances proved to be so strongly ingrained into the culture of the people prior to the introduction of Christianity, that rather than attempting to eliminate them, Christian missionaries incorporated Christian themes into the songs and poetry which accompanied the dancing, using the dances to spread their religion, as well as enabling millennia-old steps and choreographic forms to continue to be passed down from generation to generation.

At about the time of Ukraine's Kozak uprisings, social dances became more and more popular among the people native to the lands of present-day Ukraine. Ukrainian social dances (Ukrainian: Побyтовi танці, translit. Pobutovi tantsi) can be distinguished from the earlier Ukrainian ritual dances by two characteristics: the prevalence of musical accompaniment without song, and the increased presence of improvisation. The early Hopak and Kozachok developed as social dances in the areas surrounding the River Dnieper, while the Hutsulka and Kolomyjka sprang up in the Carpathian Mountains to the west. Eventually, social dances of foreign extraction such as the polka and quadrille also gained in popularity, developing distinct variations after having been performed by native dancers and musicians gifted in improvisation.

The third major type of Ukrainian folk dancing which developed prior to the modern era were the thematic or story dances (Ukrainian: Cюжетнi танці, translit. Siuzhetni tantsi). The story dances incorporated an artistically sophisticated level of pantomime and movement which entertained audiences. Thematic story dances told the story of a particular group of people through movements which mimicked their work; such dances included Shevchyky (Ukrainian: Шeвчики, "the tailors"), Kovali (Ukrainian: Koвaлi, "the blacksmiths"), and Kosari (Ukrainian: Kocaрi, "the reapers").

By the turn of the eighteenth century, many of these traditional dances began to be performed, or referred to thematically, by a blossoming theatrical trade. Peasant or Serf Theaters entertained the subjugated native peoples of present-day Ukraine, who remained relegated to lower social classes in their own homelands, while their foreign rulers often lived lavishly in comparison, importing foreign entertainers and their dances. It is within this context that staged Ukrainian folk dances, which depicted the ideals of an agrarian society, gained even more popularity with the native population, which further developed the theater into a thriving occupation.

== Modern history ==
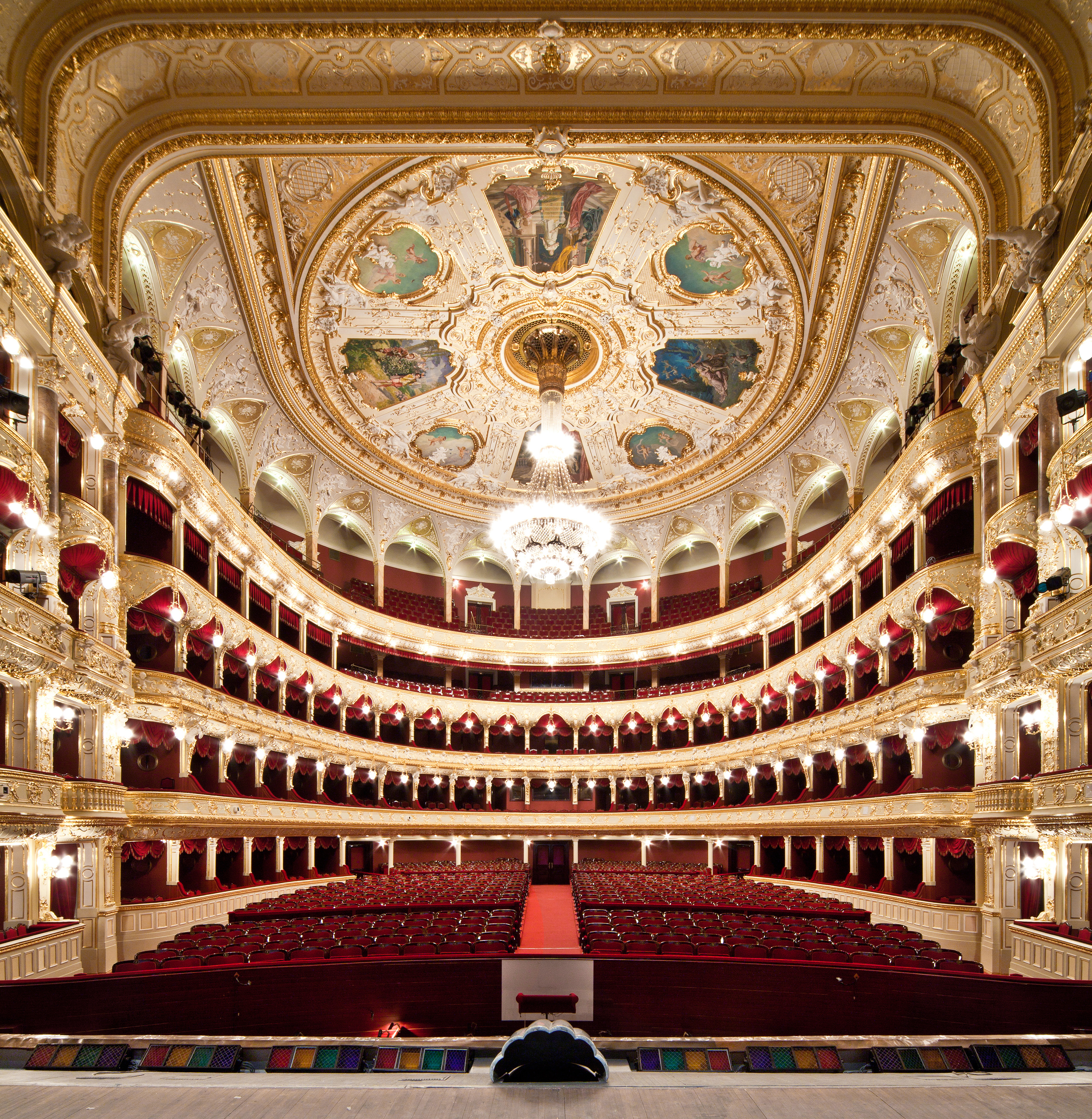
Odesa Opera and Ballet Theatre

Ukrainian folk-stage dance began the path to transforming into its present incarnation first and foremost through the work of Vasyl Verkhovynets (b. 1880, original surname Kostiv), an actor, choirmaster, and amateur musicologist. Verkhovynets had acquired a professional level of training in the arts as part of Mykola Sadovsky's theatrical troupe, which had itself incorporated a distinguished level of folk dance in its productions of dramas based on Ukrainian folk themes. While touring central Ukraine with the theatrical troupe, Verkhovynets' would take off whenever he could and visit the villages surrounding the cities he was performing in, in order to learn about and record the villages' traditional dances. His landmark book which he based upon this research, Theory of Ukrainian Folk Dance (Teopiя Українського Hapoднoго Taнкa) (1919), brought together for the first time the various steps and terminology now recognized by all contemporary students of Ukrainian dance. It also fundamentally altered the nature of Ukrainian folk dance by setting dances on a stage (with the audience seated at the front, two wings, and a backdrop), and laid out a method of transcribing folk dances, which was later put into use across the Soviet Union. This book has since been reprinted five times (the last time in 1990) and remains a basic instructional text of Ukrainian dance.

The history of Ukrainian dance diverges at this stage of Vasyl Verkhovynets career. Because of the aftermath of the Russian Revolution, it would develop contemporaneously both in Ukraine as well outside of the Iron Curtain for more than 40 years. In Ukraine, Verkhovynets remained involved in the training of the next generation of dancers, while outside of Ukraine Vasyl Avramenko, building on Verkhovynets' work, would develop the art form in the Ukrainian diaspora.

=== Development in Ukraine ===
Classical choreographers in Ukraine began to turn to Vasyl Verkhovynets for his expertise when incorporating the increasingly popular folk motifs into their works. In addition to established names like V. Lytvynenko and Leonid Zhukov, younger choreographers like Pavlo Virsky, Mykola Bolotov, and Halyna Beryozova were choreographing with folk steps and forms. During this period (between the world wars), the three-part Hopak was developed by Verkhovynets.

In 1937, Pavlo Virsky and Mykola Bolotov founded the State Folk Dance Ensemble of the Ukrainian SSR, with the goal of elevating folk-stage dance to its highest artistic level, and solidifying it as a viable stage art form. Although the group was disbanded during the Second World War, Lydia Chereshnova (who had directed the Ukrainian Song and Dance Ensemble entertaining troops during the war) brought it back into existence in 1951. After Vakhtang Vronsky of the Odesa Opera Theatre directed for a few seasons, Pavlo Virsky returned as artistic director of the State Folk Dance Ensemble of the Ukrainian SSR from 1955 until his death in 1975. During this twenty-year period, Pavlo Virsky demonstrated tremendous creativity in his choreography and propelled Ukrainian Folk-Stage Dance to a world-renowned level.

Performance of the State Folk Dance Ensemble of the Ukrainian SSR

Other notable Ukrainian choreographers and companies include:

- The Ukrainian Folk Choir, founded under the direction of Hryhoriy Veryovka in Kharkiv in 1943, including a contingent of dancers under directors Oleksander Dmytrenko, Leonid Kalinin, and later O. Homyn.
- The Chornohora Songs and Dance Ensemble was founded by Yaroslav Chuperchuk in 1946, and renamed Halychyna in 1956.
- The Dnipropetrovsk Dance Ensemble was founded in Dnipro prior to WWII, and flourished under Kim Vasylenko from 1947. Vasylenko has written numerous times on the topic of Ukrainian folk-stage dance, including the classic Lexicon of Ukrainian Folk-Stage Dance.
- Yatran Dance Ensemble was founded in Kropyvnytskyi in 1949, and gained great renown beginning in 1957 under director Anatoliy Krivokhyzha

=== Development in North America ===
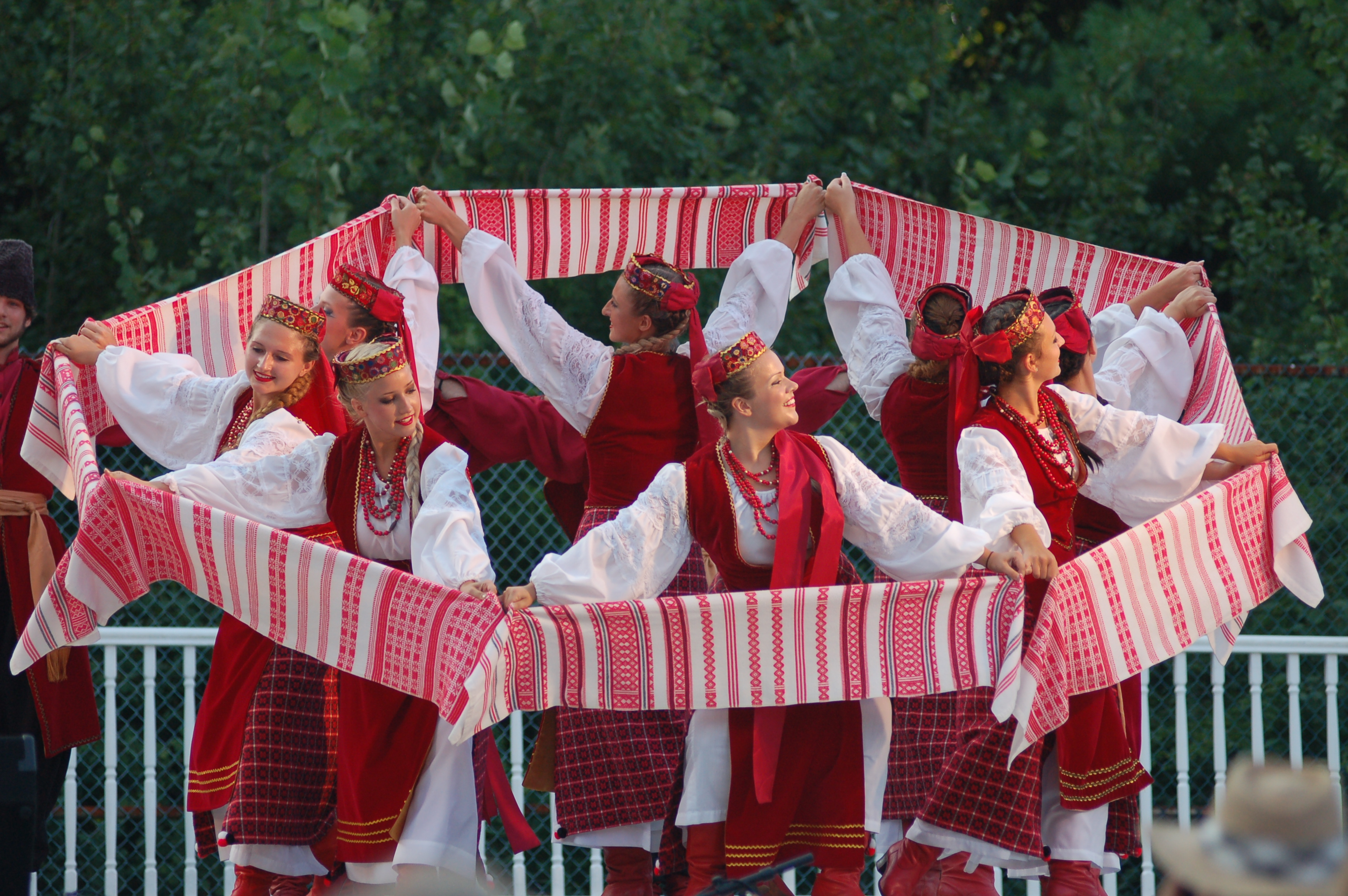
Ukrainian dance performed in Soyuzivka cultural centre, United States

Ukrainian immigrants brought their native traditions to the lands they settled, largely in Canada, Australia, the United States, and South America. Many village dances had survived the trip abroad and retained their traditional place at community gatherings (as documented in Andriy Nahachevskyy's book Social Dances of Ukrainian-Canadians). However, it was through the work of Vasyl Avramenko that Ukrainian dance secured a foothold in the West, developing as its own artform.

Vasyl Avramenko (1895–1981), began his career as a dance instructor at a Polish internment camp in 1921, having previously studied the theatrical arts in Kyiv, and later with Mykola Sadovsky's troupe, where he met and received training from Vasyl Verkhovynets. After the war, Avramenko toured western Ukraine, instructing where he could, but eventually setting out to spread Ukrainian dance throughout the world. After travelling through Poland, Czechoslovakia, and Germany, Avramenko came to Canada in 1925.

Avramenko was able to create a dance troupe by enlisting local immigrants in Canada almost immediately upon his arrival. His missionary zeal soon spread a series of dance schools throughout Canada, including the cities of Toronto, Calgary, Oshawa, Hamilton, Fort William, Port Arthur, Kenora, Winnipeg, Edmonton, Yorkton, Regina, Vegreville, Canora, Dauphin, Windsor, and many others.

Eventually, Avramenko would establish schools in the United States, including New York City, Philadelphia, Detroit, Cleveland, Utica, Yonkers, Buffalo, Boston, and others.

Avramenko created many Ukrainian dance groups in his lifetime. A nomad by nature, he would often stay in one area for only 2–3 months at a time, or about as long as it took him to teach his entire set of dances to a new group of students. When he eventually left a town, Avramenko would appoint a leader to continue teaching the dances. Many of these appointed leaders later created their own Ukrainian dance groups. One of these leaders was Chester Kuc, who in 1959 became the first Artistic Director of the Ukrainian Shumka Dancers and founded the Cheremosh Ukrainian Dance Company in Edmonton in 1969. Because of this "Johnny Appleseed" approach to his artform, Vasyl Avremenko is known in the Ukrainian diaspora as the "Father of Ukrainian Dance", and is credited with spreading this Ukrainian dancing across the world.

Avramenko's students toured much of North America, performing to tremendous acclaim at important venues such as World's Fairs, and the White House. He once even gathered over 500 dancers to appear on stage with him in a lavish evening of Ukrainian dance performed at New York's Metropolitan Opera House, in 1931. Avramenko eventually moved into film production in the United States, producing film versions of the Ukrainian operas Natalka Poltavka and Cossacks in Exile, as well as other Ukrainian dramas, starring Ukrainian immigrants, and always featuring Ukrainian dancing.

In 1978, the Ukrainian Dance Workshop was started in New York by several leading teachers of Ukrainian dance in North America, including Roma Pryma-Bohachevsky. Trained in Lviv, Vienna, and later Winnipeg, Pryma-Bohachevsky had toured the world before settling in the United States and becoming the country's most prolific teacher and choreographer of Ukrainian Folk-Stage Dance. For over twenty-five years, her direction of the Ukrainian Dance Workshop, and her Syzokryli Ukrainian Dance Ensemble, not only developed some of the finest Ukrainian dancers of North America, but also attracted already-established dancers. This combined pool of talent allowed Roma Pryma to try ever more innovative choreography, evoking modern Ukrainian themes such as the murder of outspoken musician Volodymyr Ivasiuk and the Chernobyl disaster. After developing the next generation of Ukrainian folk-stage dance instructors, establishing numerous schools and instructional intensives, choreographing hundreds of dances, and teaching thousands of students, Pryma-Bohachevsky died in 2004.

=== Development in Australia ===
One of the leading figures in the instruction of Ukrainian dance in Australia was Vladimir Kania, who organized his first adult dance ensemble in Perth in 1951, and ran that ensemble and others for decades. Kania had been trained in Ukrainian dance in his hometown of Jarosław.

Another early innovator in Australia was Natalia Tyrawski, who founded the Ukrainian National Ballet (later renamed "Veselka") in 1952 in Sydney. Tyrawski had studied and performed professionally in Ukraine, and continued to teach Ukrainian dance in Australia for almost fifty years.

In the 1960s, Vasyl Avramenko visited Australia and experienced similar successes in developing dancers on yet another continent and promoting the Ukrainian Folk-Stage Dance style which he and Vasyl Verkhovynets had pioneered. Most of Avramenko's influence in Australia stemmed from his massive workshops, which were attended by students of various ages.

Marina Berezowsky moved to Perth, Australia with her husband in 1949, after having performed with numerous dance companies in Ukraine. After working extensively with the West Australian Ballet and the Australian Ballet School, she founded and became artistic director and resident choreographer of the Kolobok Dance Company in Melbourne in 1970, in the wake of successful Australian tours by various international folk dance companies. Kolobok's goal was to give artistic expression to the varied dance traditions brought to Australia by Ukrainians and other immigrants.

The "Kuban Cossacks" dance troupe was formed in 1956 in Melbourne, and led by Wasyl and Lilly Kowalenko, achieved international success for their performances of Ukrainian cossack dances and songs. By 1989 the troupe had appeared in 13,000 live shows in 30 countries, and had appeared on 160 television shows.

== Regional styles of dance ==
Ukrainian folk dance was fundamentally altered when it began to be performed on stage, as it was transformed into a new art form: Ukrainian folk-stage dance. Once dance masters such as Verkhovynets and Avramenko began gathering a repertoire of dances and touring Ukrainian lands with their troupes, teaching workshops in the villages as they went, the inherent regional variations which stemmed from the improvisational nature of pre-modern Ukrainian folk dances began to slowly fade. The types of dances one would see in one part of the country began to be performed in other parts of the country, and "Ukrainian dances" became a more homogeneous group.

Ukraine has many ethnocultural regions, many with their own music, dialect, form of dress, and dance steps. The scholarship of Verkhovynets and Avramenko, however, was mostly limited to the villages of central Ukraine. Gradually, others began filling in the gaps of this research, by researching the dance forms of the various ethnic groups of western Ukraine, publishing this scholarship, and founding regional dance ensembles. Most of this research, however, occurred after Verkhovynets' and Avramenko had already toured Ukraine, which limited the available sources of "traditional dance" knowledge to isolated villages or the immigrant communities who left their native territories before Verkhovynets and Avramenko began touring.

Because of the spread and influence of Verkhovynets and Avramenko's early work, most of the dances representing these ethnocultural regions, as performed by modern-day Ukrainian folk-stage dance ensembles, still incorporate the basic steps of bihunets and tynok, although new variations between "regional" styles of dance have developed as a result of more and more advanced instruction and choreographies becoming prevalent. Story (character) dances, such as pantomimed fables, and staged ritual dances are not necessarily linked to particular regions.

The stage costumes adopted by modern-day Ukrainian dance ensembles are based on traditional dress, but represent an idealized image of village life, with dancers identically dressed in vibrant colors untarnished by time or nature. While the dance-steps, costumes, and music differ from dance to dance, it is important to realize that many of these variations are modern-day choreographic constructs, with changes having been made to advance the art more than to preserve cultural traditions.

The "regional dances" of Ukrainian dance include:

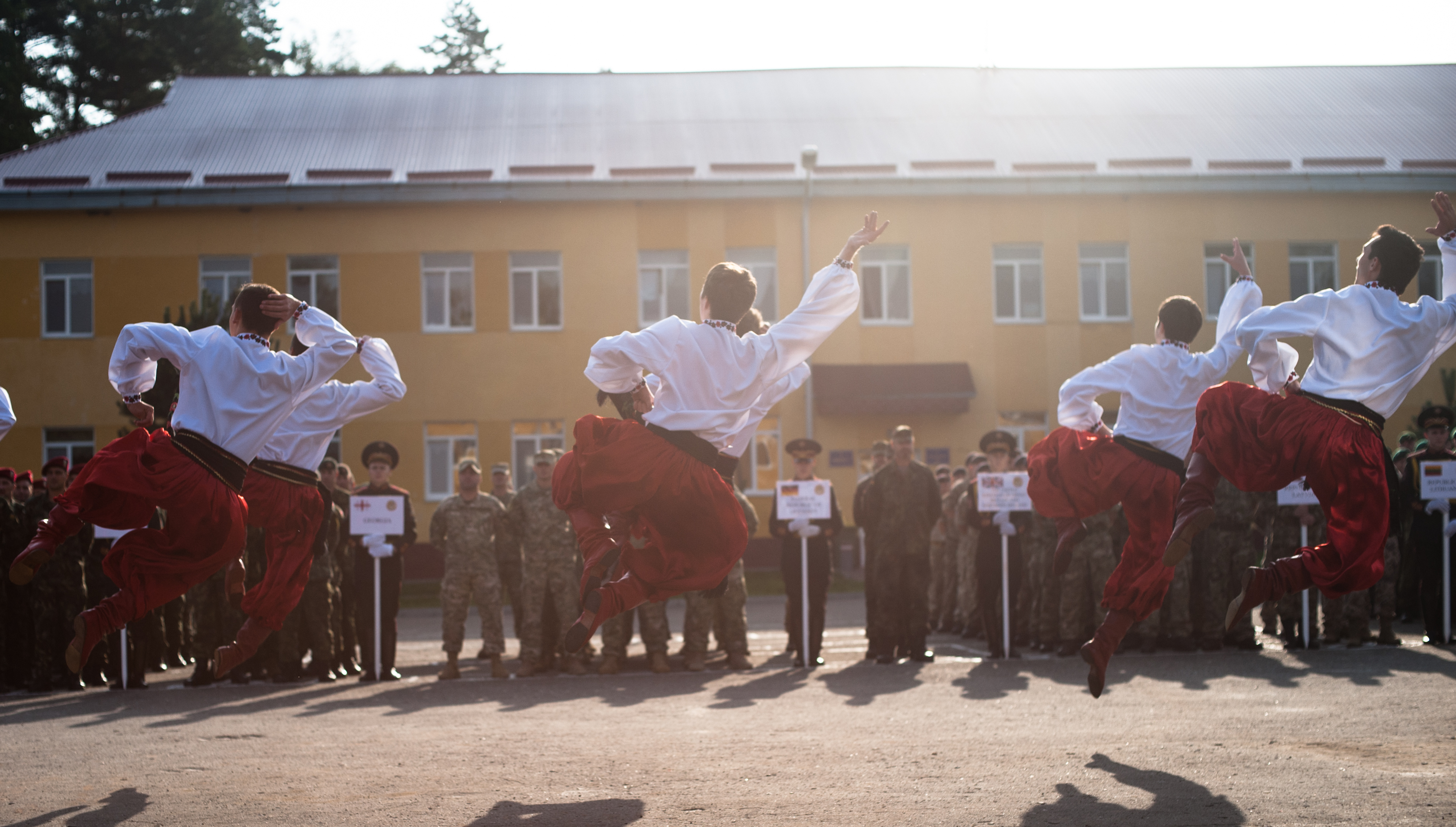
Kozak Hopak by Military Ukrainian Dance Ensemble

- Central Ukrainian or Kozak (Cossack) Dances, representing the culture and traditions of the Ukrainian Kozaks (Kozaky), Poltava and other central Ukrainian lands surrounding the River Dnieper; these are the dances most commonly associated with Ukrainian dance. The culture of central and eastern Ukraine developed under many foreign influences, due to both trade and foreign invasion. The greatest indigenous cultural influence was the semi-military society of the Kozaks, whose love of social dances spawned the Hopak (Video on YouTube), the Kozachok (Video on YouTube), the Povzunets (Video on YouTube), the Chumaky (Video on YouTube), and many others. The men's costumes for these dances are styled after Kozak dress, with boots, a comfortable shirt, a sash (poyas) tied around the waist, and loose, billowy riding trousers (sharovary); common accessories include overcoats, hats, and swords. The women's costumes have subtler variations since the woman's blouse generally displays more embroidery than the men's shirt, the skirt (plakhta) is woven with various geometric and color patterns, and they wear a headpiece of flowers and ribbons (vinok). All of these pieces can vary from village to village, or even based on a family tradition, although most professional ensembles dress their performers with identical costumes, for aesthetic reasons. The style of these dances is acrobatic and physically demanding for the men, who are often showcased individually; women have traditionally played secondary roles, displaying grace and beauty while often dancing in technically demanding unison.

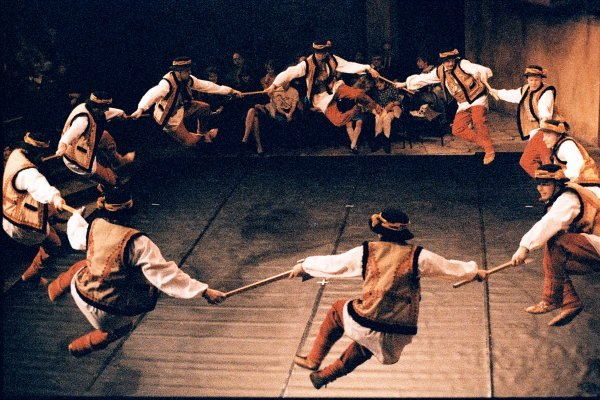
Performers of Arkan dance

- Hutsul Dances, representing the culture and traditions of Hutsulshchyna. While Vasyl Avramenko's Hutsul dances are notoriously inaccurate depictions of the dances of the Hutsuls, the highlanders who inhabit the Carpathian Mountains, the demand for additional research to fill in the gaps of Verkhovynets initial work eventually brought about a revived interest in Hutsul customs and traditions, and soon Hutsul and Carpathian dance ensembles had developed the second most-recognizable style of Ukrainian dance. The well-known dances of the region of Pokuttia is the Kolomyika (Video on YouTube) which is named after the biggest city of the region, Kolomea; the Hutsulka (1 on YouTube, 2 on YouTube). The mountainous Hutsul region of Ukraine, Hutsulshchyna, is adjacent to the Romanian regions of Bukovina and Maramureş, and the regions are ethno-culturally linked. In depicting Hutsuls dances, dancers traditionally wear leather moccasins known as postoly, and decorated vests known as keptari. Men's pants are not as loose as the kozak dress, and women wear a skirt composed of front and back panels, tied at the waist. Hutsul costumes traditionally incorporate orange, brown, green, and yellow embroidery. Hutsul dances are well known for being lively and energetic, characterized by quick stamping and intricate footwork, combined with swift vertical movements. A well-known Hutsul dance is the arkan ('lasso', cf. Romanian arcan), in which men dance around a fire.
- Transcarpathian Dances, representing the culture and traditions of Ukrainian Zakarpattia. Dances from this region are known for their large sweeping movements and colourful costumes, with the general movement being "bouncy". A signature dance from this region is bereznianka.

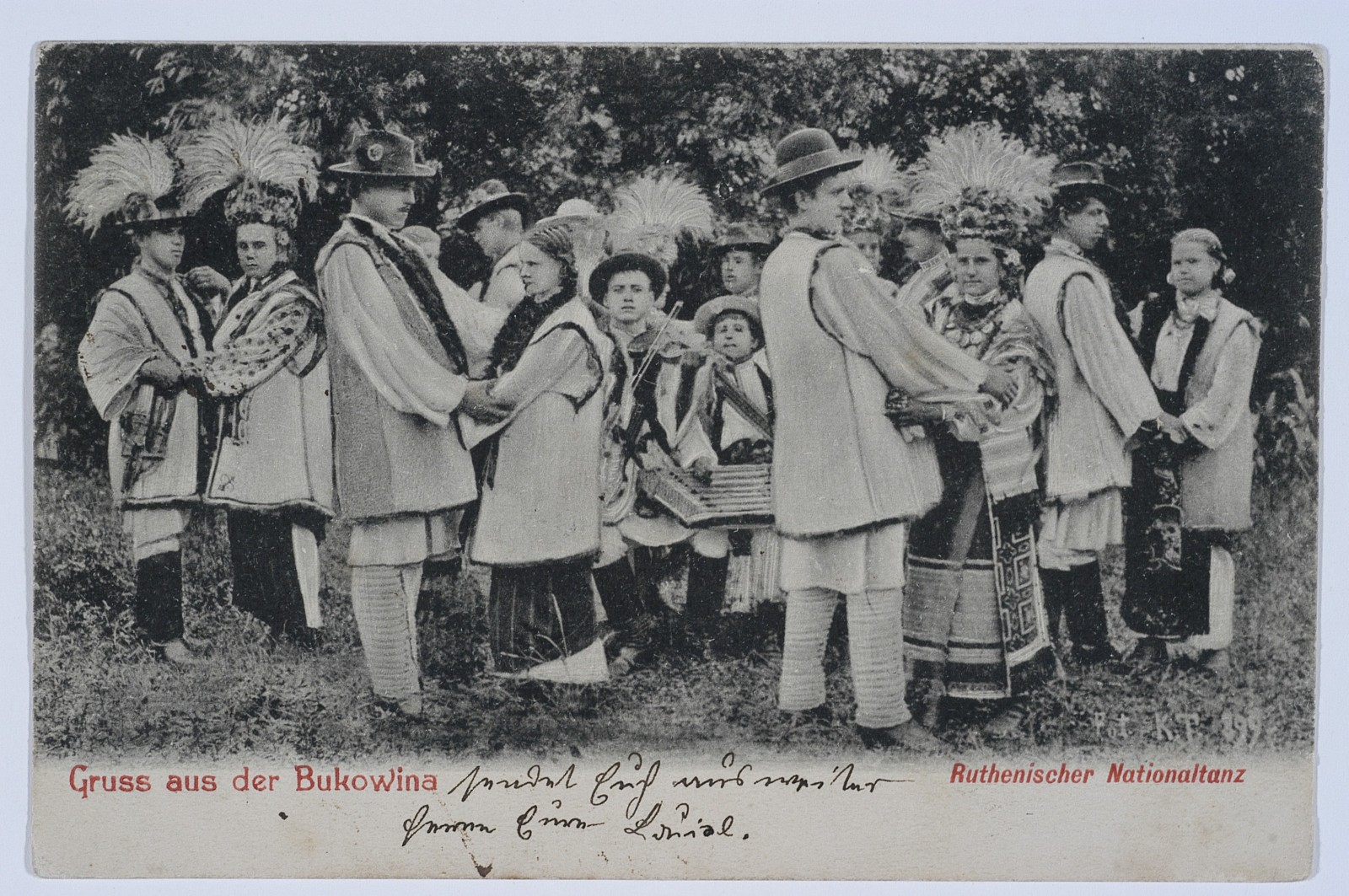
Postcard from the Austrian era depicting the national dance of Ruthenians (Ukrainians) from Bukovyna

- Bukovinian Dances, representing the culture and traditions of Bukovina, a transitional highland between Ukraine and Romania, historically ruled by the Romanian Principality of Moldavia, as well as the Habsburg Empire and the Tatars. Ukrainian dances depicting Bukovinian music and dance is peppered with dichotomies and contrapuntal themes, perhaps reflecting the political histories of the region. In these dances, both men and women perform a variety of foot-stamps. Usually, the girls' headpieces are very distinctive, consisting of tall wheat stalks, ostrich feathers, or other unique protuberances. The embroidery on the blouses and shirts is typically stitched with darker and heavier threads, and women's skirts are sometimes open at the front, revealing an embroidered slip.
- Volyn' Dances, representing the culture and traditions of Volyn'. This region is located in north-western Ukraine. The representative costumes worn by Ukrainian dancers are bright and vibrant, while the dance steps are characterized by energetic jumping, high legs, and lively arms. The dances representing this region have been influenced by the traditional dances of Poland, due to Volyn's geographical proximity with Poland, and Poland's extended rule over the area.
- Polissian Dances, representing the culture and traditions of Polissia. The steps of Polissian dance as depicted by Ukrainian dancers are characteristically very bouncy and with emphasis on high knee movement. The costumes often incorporate white, red, and beige as the main colors, and girls often wear aprons. A popular Polissian dance is called mazurochky.

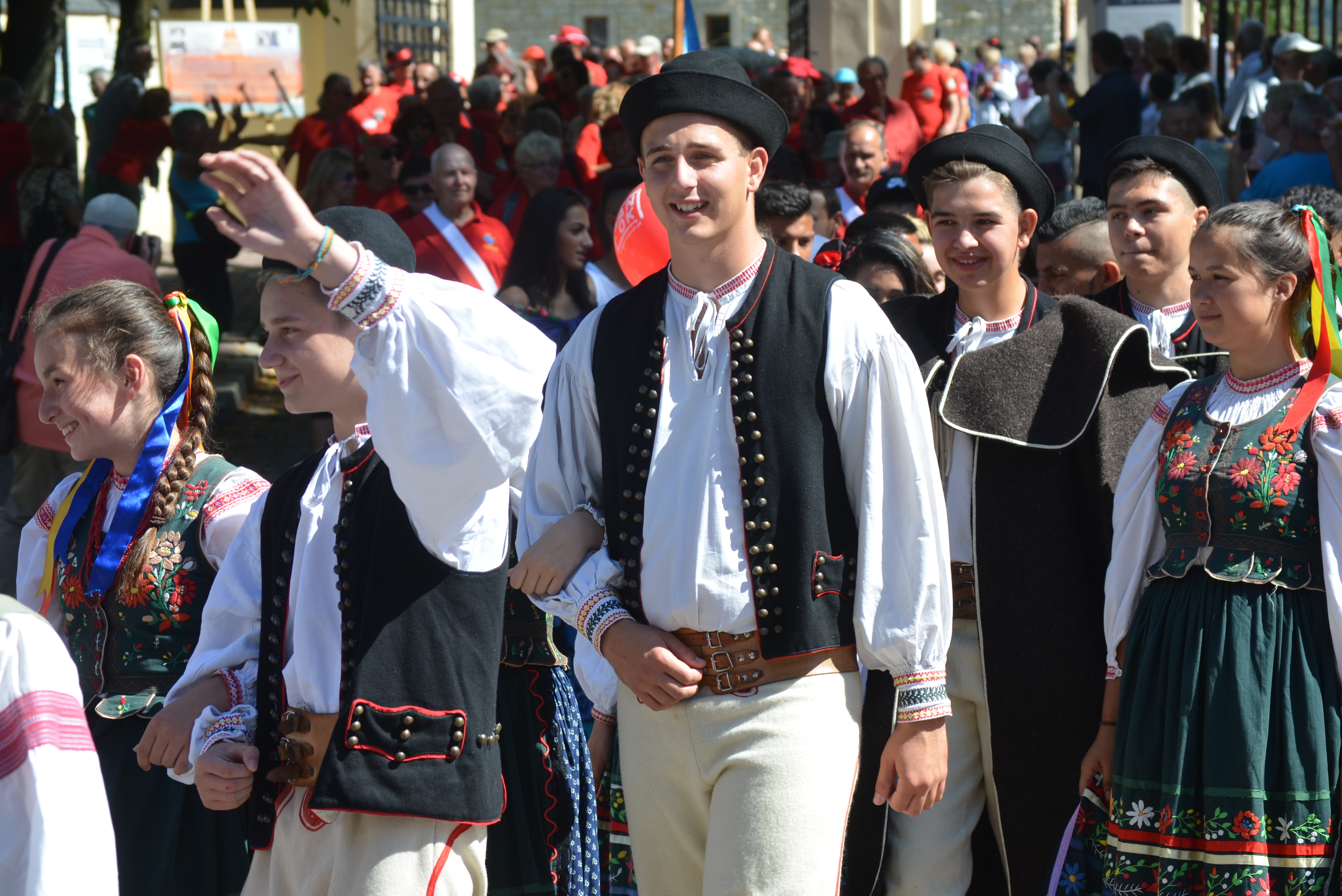
Lemko folk dancers in Sanok

- Lemko Dances, representing the culture and traditions of Lemkivshchyna. The ethnographic region of the Lemkos lays mainly in Poland, with a small part falling within current Ukrainian borders. Relatively isolated from ethnic Ukrainians, the Lemko people have a unique lifestyle and ethnography, like that of the Hutsuls, which Ukrainian dance choreographers enjoy depicting. The dance costumes typically depict the men and women with short vests, with the style of dance being light-hearted as well as lively.
- Podillian Dances, representing the culture and traditions of Podillia. Podillian dances are oftentimes accompanied with the traditional custom of welcoming with bread and salt, in addition to singing ritual greetings alongside high-energy and colourful dances. Podillian dances share some similarities with those of Central Ukraine.
- Boiko Dances, representing the culture and traditions of Boikivshchyna. Boiko customs, including traditional dances & folk clothing differ from that of the Lemkos & Hutsuls.
- Polissian Dances, representing the cultures and traditions of Polissia. The dances in Polissia are reflective of the region’s natural geography (marsh & woodlands), performing elastic, jump-like movements softly, in a lively manner, with a gradual advance. Though Polissia also encompasses parts of Poland & Belarus, dances from Ukrainian Polissia are uninfluenced by either neighbouring country. Polissian dances place emphasis on knee movement & typically feature bouncing movements.
- Romani Dances, representing the culture and traditions of Ukrainian Tsyhany: The Romani people have lived in Ukraine for centuries. Those inhabiting the Carpathian Mountains have even developed their own dialect of the Rom language, as well as customs and traditional dances limited to their own villages. Many Ukrainian folk-stage dance ensembles have incorporated stylized Tsyhans'ky ("Gypsy") dances into their repertoire ((1) on YouTube, (2) on YouTube).

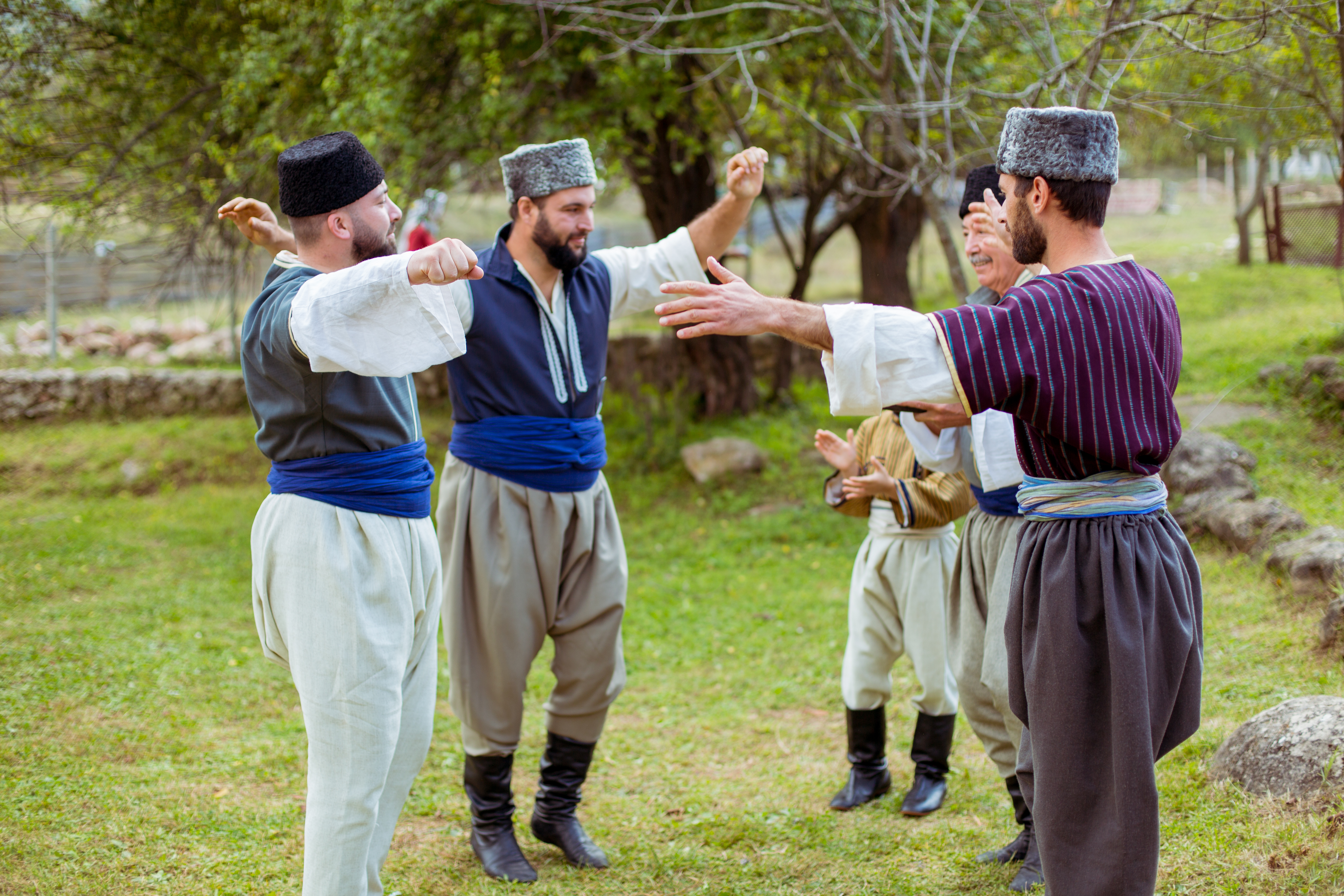
Crimean Tatar male dancers

- Crimean Dances, representing the culture & traditions of Crimea. Crimean dances encompasses that of Crimea’s indigenous inhabitants, the Crimean Tatars, Krymchaks & Crimean Karaites. Dances from this region heavily feature body turns, with sharp hand movements being absent. Features commonly presented in Crimean men’s dances include a slender body, arms outstretched in multiple directions and elbows bent in half. In Crimean women’s dances, majestic & graceful movements are featured, variable steps of the toes & soft hand movements. Notable Crimean dances include Haytarma, Tym-Tym, Çobani & Ağir Ava.

== See also ==
- Ukrainian dancers, 1890s and early 1900s painting series by Edgar Degas
- List of ethnic, regional, and folk dances by origin
- National Ballet of Ukraine
- Grand Kyiv Ballet
