= Hopak =

Ukrainian folk dance

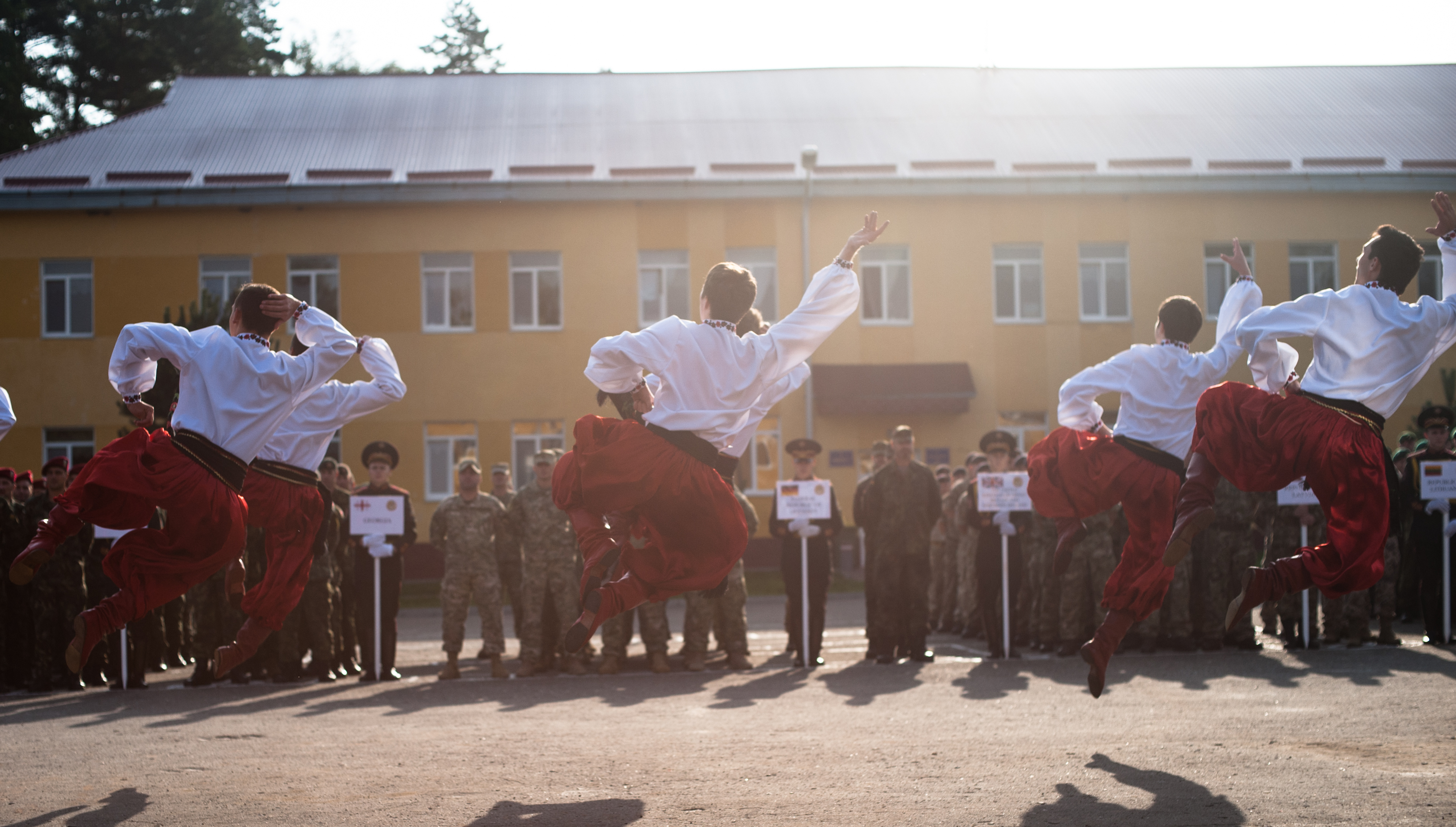
- Hopak by the Military Ukrainian Dance Ensemble (2014)
- Native name: Гопак
- Etymology: Ukrainian: гопати, lit. 'to hop'
- Genre: Folk dance
- Time signature: 2/4 (dominant) not standardized by tempo
- Origin: Zaporozhian Cossack male dance

Hopak (Ukrainian: гопак, IPA: [ɦoˈpɑk]) is a Ukrainian folk dance originating as a male dance among the Zaporozhian Cossacks, but later danced by couples, male soloists, and mixed groups of dancers. It is performed most often as a solitary concert dance by amateur and professional Ukrainian dance ensembles, as well as other performers of folk dances. It has also been incorporated into larger artistic opuses such as operas, ballets and theatre.

The hopak is often popularly referred to as the "National Dance of Ukraine" and has become very popular in Poland. There are similar folkloric dance tunes known as Sirmpa in Leros, Greece.

== Etymology ==
The name hopak is derived from the verb hopaty (Ukrainian: гопати) which means "to hop", as well as the corresponding exclamation hop! (Ukrainian: гоп) which can be uttered during a jump as an expression of surprise or amazement.

== History ==
=== Medieval history ===
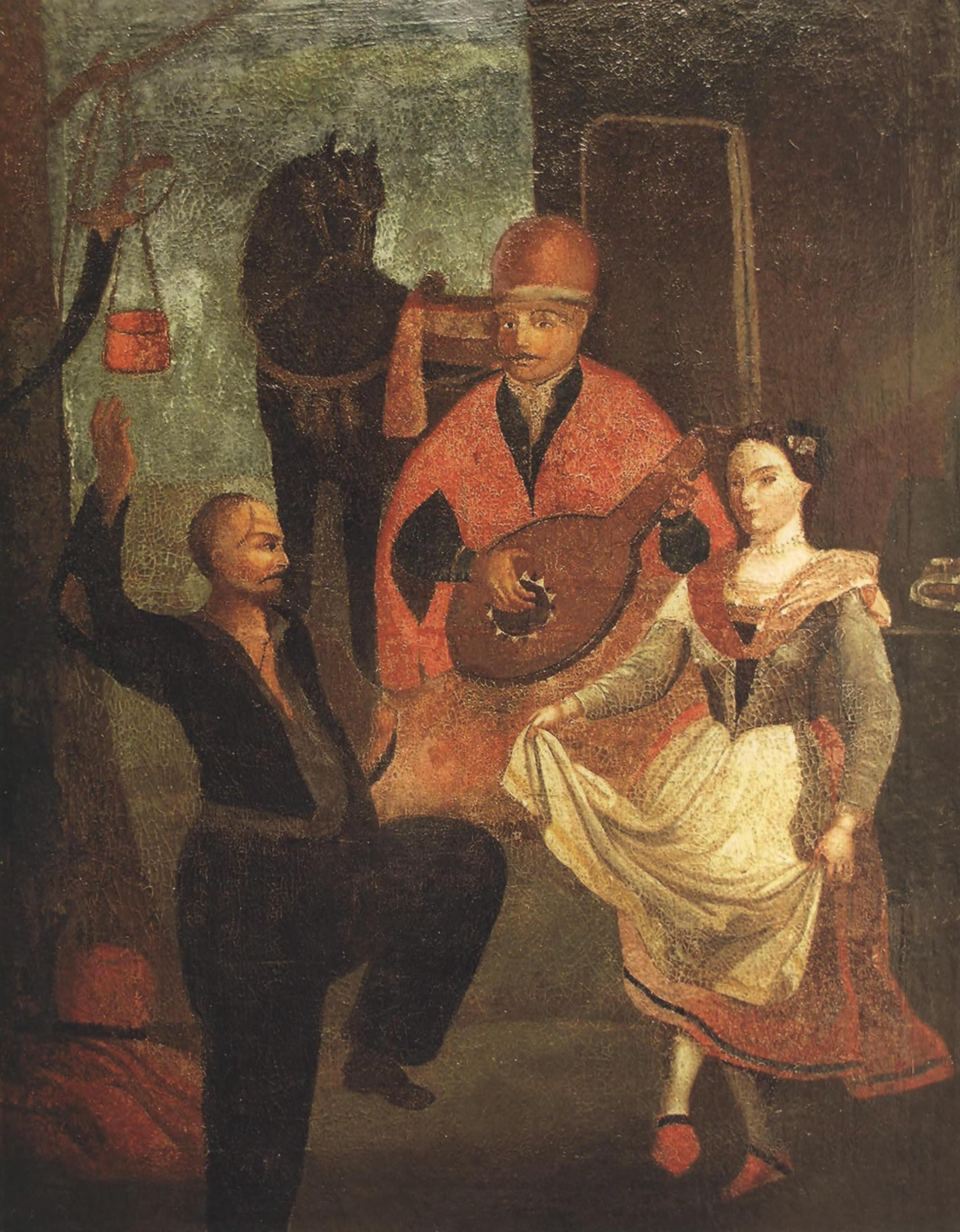
Hopak (late 18th - early 19th century)

The Hopak developed initially as a Cossack social dance (Ukrainian: побyтовi танці, translit. pobutovi tantsi), and was practiced in the lands of present-day Ukraine beginning in the 16th century. While the militaristic Zaporizhian Sich generally frowned upon amusements and diversions from military training, such regulations were overlooked when Kozaks returned victorious after battle. Kobzars and other musicians would gather their instruments - violins, bagpipes, bandura, cimbaloms, and sopilka - while others would dance.

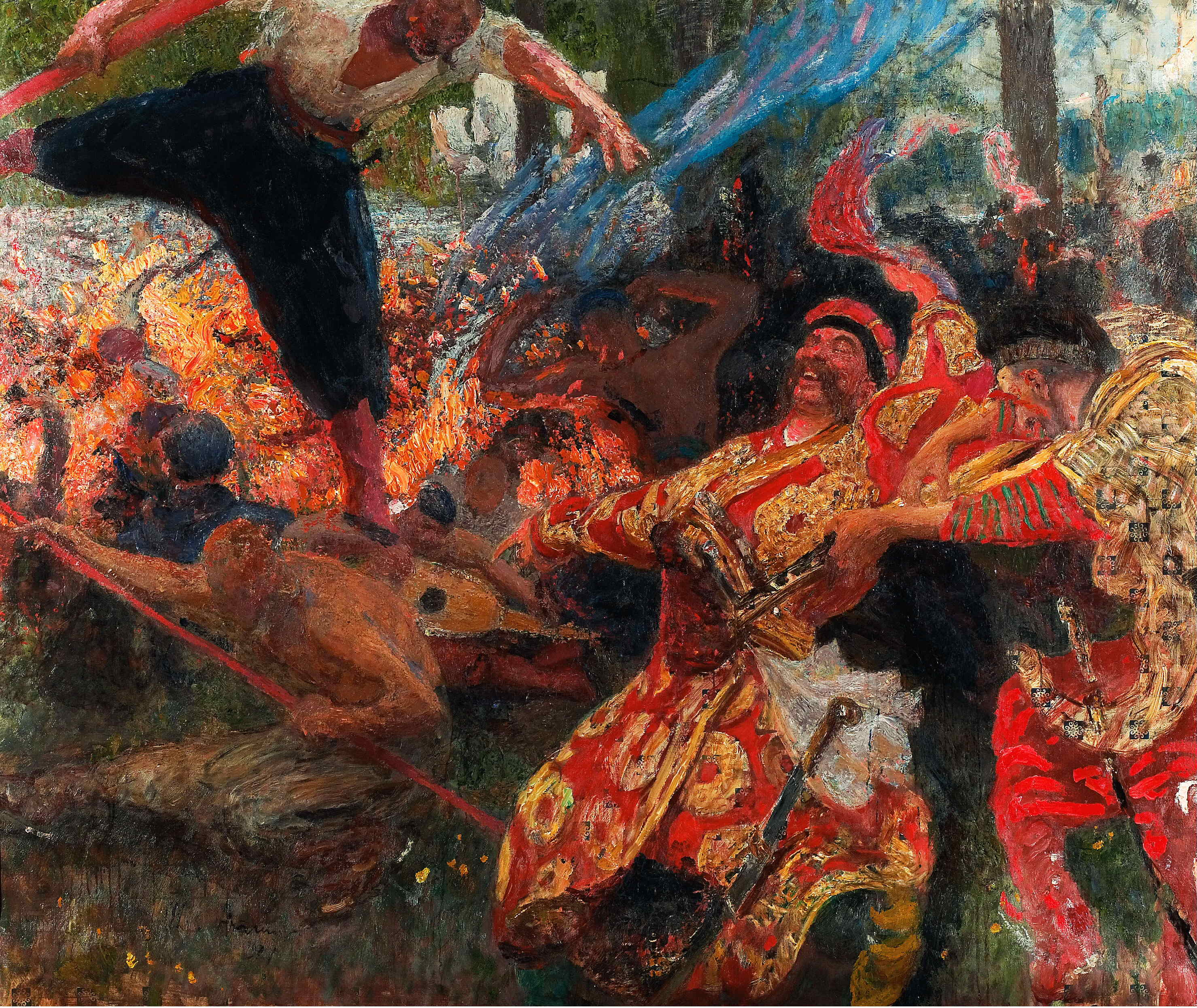
Hopak (a late, unfinished painting by Ilya Repin)

This celebratory hopaky was performed only by male participants, as they took place in an all-male environment. The performers were young, boisterous mercenaries, and not professional dancers; as such, the dance steps performed were predominantly improvisational, reflecting the performers' sense of manliness, heroism, speed and strength. The steps exhibited included many acrobatic jumps (Ukrainian: стрибки, translit. strybky). Often fights from the battlefield would be re-enacted in pantomime, with real swords, lances or other weaponry, as the performer lashed out at invisible enemies. These dances were not tied down to specific rhythms, and the dancers could change tempo at any point.

Such festive dancing differed greatly in character from the older ritual dances (Ukrainian: oбpядовi танці, translit. obryadovi tantsi), such as the Khorovod, which had previously been the dominant choreographic works in Ruthenian lands. A primary distinction was the gender of the participants – all male – as opposed to the predominantly all-female ritual dances.

With the elevation of Cossack status in the region, hopaky began to appear in the villages within their domain. Unlike the all-male dances found in the Sich, these dances were mixed, with young boys and girls dancing celebratory movements together. While the lead role was retained by male performers, structural elements began to be added in, such as circle forms and pairs moving together in formation; these developments most likely were derived from the choreographic history of ritual dances in the area.

None of the dances performed by Cossacks during this time were ever recorded. Guillaume Le Vasseur de Beauplan recorded the fact that Cossacks danced in such a manner, and other historical accounts verify this. Later, Ivan Kotlyarevsky and Taras Shevchenko incorporated the Hopak and dancing Cossacks into their works. However, with the destruction of the Sich in the 18th century, the dance survived only in its mixed-gender village format as a celebratory dance.

=== Concert dance ===
Hopak - a Soviet short film (1931)

After Hopak-like dances began to be performed on stage in the 18th century in Serf and Peasant theaters, professional dramatic troupes began to incorporate this popular dance into their repertoire. These performances only incorporated the Hopak into a larger opus, such as Kotliarevsky's operetta Natalka Poltavka. It was the pioneering work of a performer in a dramatic ensemble, the ethnochoreologist Vasyl Verkhovynets, in the early 20th century, that enable the dance to develop into its current format. Verkhovynets' initial work entailed gathering authentic village steps throughout central Ukraine and constructing dances which more accurately represented the Ukrainian cultural tradition. His break-through, however, was demonstrating that staged Ukrainian dance could exist as a distinct performing art, in the form of concert dance. He and his disciple Vasyl Avramenko began staging performances throughout western Ukraine, forming troupes of dancers in village after village.

In the spring of 1935, the All-Union Organization of Cultural Relations with Foreign Countries agreed to send a delegation to the upcoming First International Festival of the Folk Dance in London. Verkhovynets worked with Leonid Zhukov of the T. Shevchenko Kyiv Opera and Ballet, and professional dancers from both the Kyiv and Kharkiv Opera houses, on constructing a suite to represent the Ukrainian SSR. For his part, Verkhovynets choreographed what became known as the "London Hopak" (Ukrainian: лондонський гопак, translit. londonskiy hopak): this was a 3-part dance, consisting of a men's dance (much like the original Kozak dance), a second, slower segment danced only by women, and finally a rousing closing with both male and female dancers sharing the stage. This dance, along with Zhukov's addition, won the first prize at the festival that summer. The 3-part Hopak was later reprised in September back in Ukraine as part of the opera, Zaporozhets za Dunayem. The format of the 3-part Hopak was subsequently adopted by many professional folk dance ensembles including Pavlo Virsky Ukrainian National Folk Dance Ensemble who have choreographed their own variants of Hopak through the years. Pavlo Virsky Ukrainian National Folk Dance Ensemble performed their Hopak in New York and other places around the world.

In 1990, twenty members of the State Folk Dance Ensemble of the Ukrainian SSR, split off and created the Hopak! Ukrainian Dance Company, Ukraine's first independent professional dance company, under the direction of Sergei Makarov.

== Dance steps ==
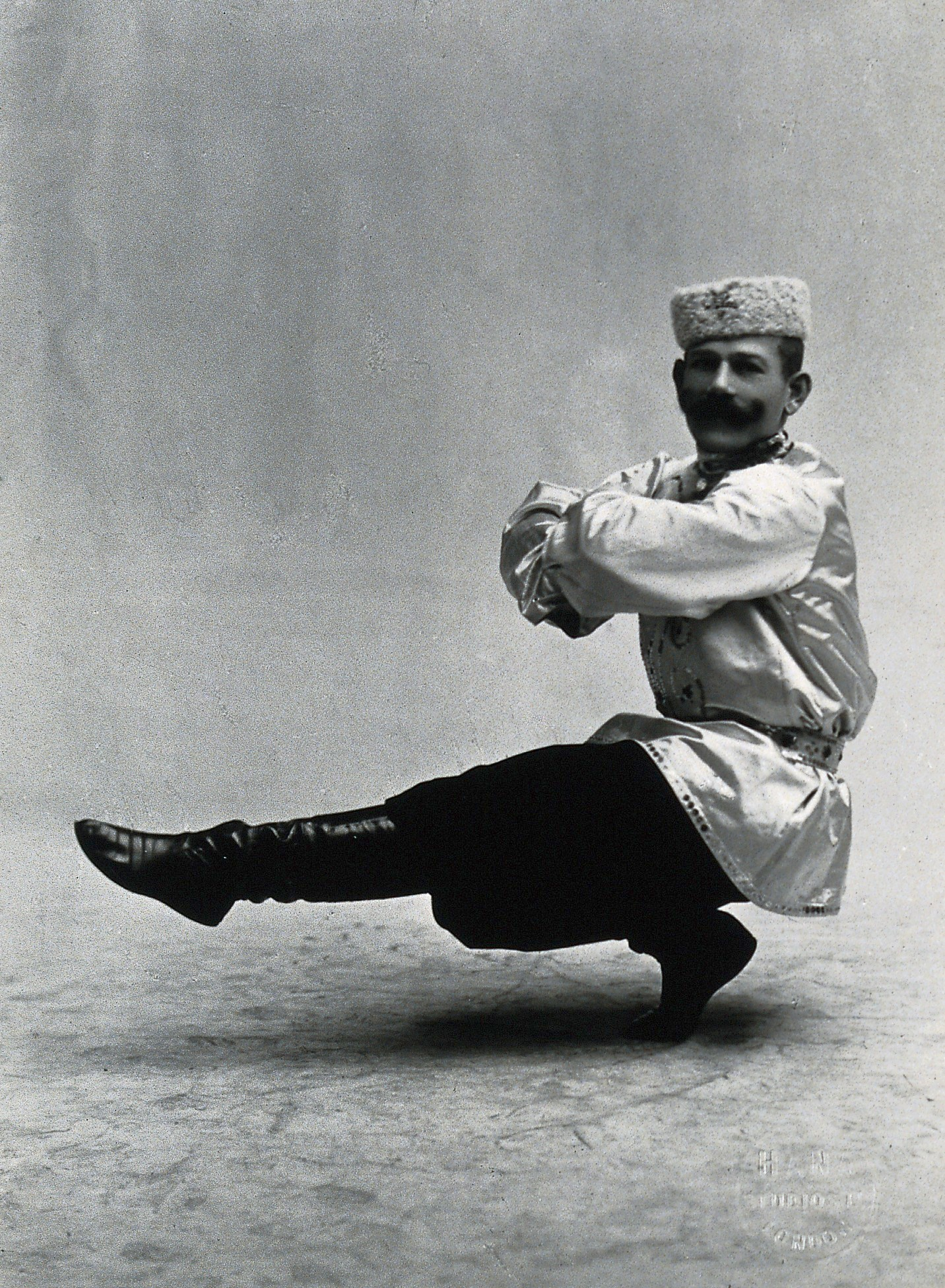
A demonstration of the squat movement

The modern-day Hopak is a choreographed dance made to appear full of improvisation. Much of the seemingly improvised parts involve solo dancers, usually male, performing visually and technically amazing acrobatic feats. These include jumps and spins, and are usually the highlight of the performance.

The rest of the dance includes many movements performed in unison, especially by the female dancers, while male dancers typically perform squat sequences.

Because of the speed and energy required to perform a successful Hopak, this dance is usually performed at the end of a program. As in many Ukrainian dances, the dancers, especially the women, do not stop moving until the end of the dance.

== Hopak music ==
Music for the Hopak is not standardized by tempo or melody, although 2/4 time predominates most arrangements. The dance is supposed to evoke a sense of improvisation, so the pace of the music changes from segment to segment, allowing dancers to distinguish themselves. The melodies of the songs Hop, moyi hrechanyky (Ukrainian: Гоп, мої гречаники) and Od Kyieva do Luben (Ukrainian: Од Києва до Лубень) can be found in many Hopak arrangements. Hopaks usually end on a fast and furious pace, with some incorporating boisterous Ukrainian marches, such as Zasvystaly kozachen'ky (Ukrainian: Засвистали козаченьки).

A number of composers have composed a Hopak as part of an opera or ballet:

Operas

- Modest Mussorgsky, in The Fair at Sorochyntsi
- Pyotr Ilyich Tchaikovsky, in Mazepa
- Nikolay Rimsky-Korsakov, in May Night
- Semen Hulak-Artemovsky, in Zaporozhets za Dunayem

Ballets

- Aram Khachaturian, in Gayane
- Vasily Solovyov-Sedoi, in Taras Bulba
- Cesare Pugni, in The Little Humpbacked Horse
- Anatoliy Sviechnikov, in Marusia Bohuslavka

== References to hopak ==
Soviet leader Joseph Stalin once famously forced his eventual successor Nikita Khrushchev (who had been the Communist Party chief in Ukraine) to dance the hopak.

The hopak was performed as a part of the choreographic suite Friendship of Peoples by dancers in Ukrainian folk costumes during the opening ceremony of the 1980 Summer Olympics. This event took place on the field of the Central Lenin Stadium, with a large section of the tribune under the Olympic Flame Cauldron coloured in Ukrainian folk patterns during the performance.

In the 2000s, hopak music was extensively used by Ukrainians Anna Bessonova and Natalia Godunko in their routines of rhythmic gymnastics.

In 2015, the videogame Team Fortress 2 added the Hopak as a taunt move within the Gun Mettle Update. The taunt was first shown off during Day 2 of the update, then the taunt and the update itself launched with the July 2, 2015, Patch. The taunt titled the "Kazotsky Kick" after the related Kozachok dance. Players can make all nine classes perform the dance during gameplay, with each class adding unique moves to their own dance sequences.

== See also ==
- Combat Hopak
