= Vasyl Verkhovynets =

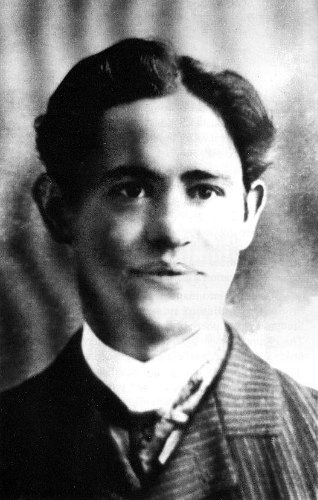
Vasyl Verkhovynets

Vasyl Mykolayovych Verkhovynets' (Ukrainian: Василь Верховинець; 18 January 1880 - 11 April 1938) was an actor, conductor, composer, voice teacher, amateur musicologist, balletmaster, choreographer and dance ethnographer from Galicia. He is credited for fundamentally altering the course of Ukrainian dance by devising a method of transcribing dance to paper, recording traditional dances and steps from numerous villages, setting dances on a stage, and fostering generations of Ukrainian dance researchers and practitioners. He was also the founder of the modern three-part hopak.

== Biography ==
Vasyl Verkhovynets was born Vasyl Kostiv (Ukrainian: Василь Костів) on 18 (O.S. 5) January, 1880 in Staryi Mizun, Dolyna district, Galicia. In 1899 he graduated from a teachers' seminary in Sambir, and between 1900 and 1906 worked at the Ruska Besida Theatre in Lviv. Starting from 1906 and until 1915, he worked at the Mykola Sadovskyi theatre in Kyiv. In 1910 he played Apollo in the theatre's production of Kotliarevskyi's Eneida. Between 1915 and 1919 Verkhovynets worked as a conductor and choirmaster at the Society of Ukrainian Artists. He also taught choreography at the Kyiv Drama School, where one of his pupils was Vasyl Avramenko.

After graduating from the Odesa Music and Drama School in 1927, Verkhovynets studied in Moscow at the ballet class of Asaf Messerer. During the same year, he organized the travelling cappella "Chumak" in Kharkiv. In 1930 Verkhovynets organized a women's cappella in Poltava, where he worked as a professor at the local institute. He also taught at Kharkiv Music and Drama Institute, and became one of the founders of Kharkiv Musical Comedy Theatre. Verkhovynets died in 1938 in Kyiv as a result of repressions by the Soviet regime. In 1958 he was posthumously rehabilitated.

== Work ==
In addition to his theatrical work, Verkhovynets arranged folk music, including children's songs. He also published studies on Ukrainian wedding traditions and theory of Ukrainian folk dance, as well as a collection of vesnianky songs. In total, he recorded and arranged over 300 compositions.

== Publications ==
In English:

- Shatulsky, Myron (1980). The Ukrainian Folk Dance, Kobzar Publishing Co. Ltd. ISBN 0-9692078-5-9.
- Zerebecky, Bohdan (1985). Ukrainian Dance Resource Booklets, Series I-IV, Ukrainian Canadian Committee, Saskatchewan Provincial Council.

In Ukrainian:

- Avramenko, Vasyl (1947). Ukrainian National Dances, Music, and Costumes, National Publishers, Ltd.
- Humeniuk, Andriy (1962). Ukrainian Folk Dance, Academy of Sciences Ukrainian of the SSR.
- Humeniuk, Andriy (1963). Folk Choreographic Art of Ukraine, Academy of Sciences of the Ukrainian SSR.
- Verkhovynets’, Vasyl’ (1912). Ukrainian Wedding.
- Verkhovynets’, Vasyl’(1919). Theory of Ukrainian Folk Dance.
- Verkhovynets’, Vasyl’ (1925). Vesnyanochka State Publishers of Ukraine.
- Verkhovynets’, Yaroslav (1963). Biographical outline of Vasyl' Verkhovynets' in the third edition of Theory of Ukrainian Folk Dance, State Publishers of Pictorial Art and Musical Literature.

== See also ==
- Executed Renaissance
