= Vasyl Avramenko =

Ukrainian actor and dancer

- Василь Кирилович Авраменко
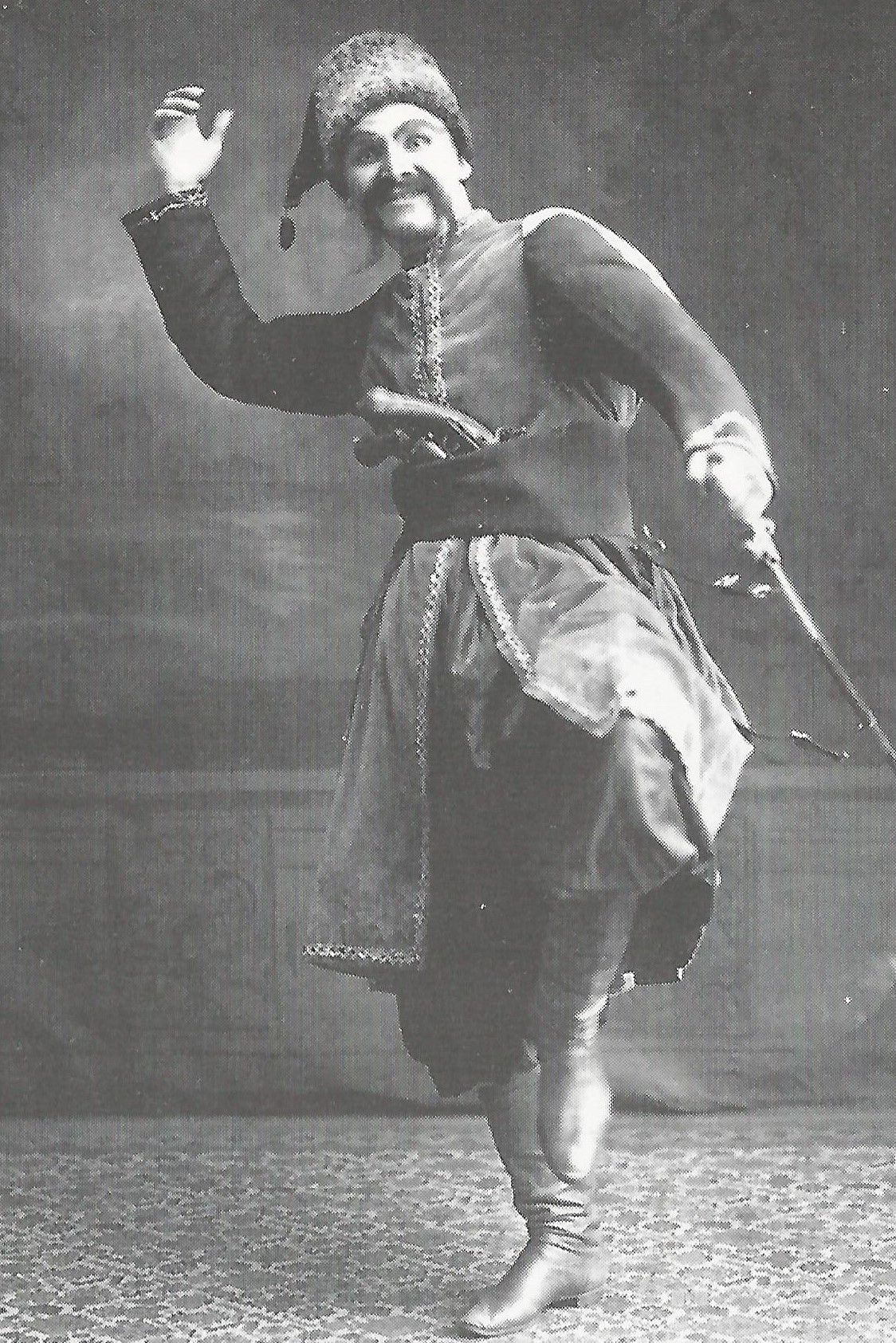
- Avramenko's "Gonta" Solo Dance, from a 1922 publication
- Born: March 22, 1895; Stebliv
- Died: May 6, 1981 (aged 86); New York, U.S.
- Other name: Vasile Avramenko
- Occupations: Actor, dancer, impresario, filmmaker

Vasyl Kyrylovych Avramenko (Ukrainian: Василь Кирилович Авраменко; sometimes transcribed as Vasile) (March 22, 1895 – May 6, 1981) was a Ukrainian actor, dancer, choreographer, balletmaster, director, and film producer, credited with spreading Ukrainian folk dance across the world. Colourful, energetic, imaginative, and, quite often exasperating, he was an impresario greatly reminiscent of The Music Man. For his unparalleled missionary zeal and his love of Ukrainian culture, he is considered by many to be the "Father of Ukrainian Dance".

== Early days ==
Vasyl Avramenko was born on March 22, 1895, in Stebliv, a townlet located on the Ros' river approximately 100 km south of Kyiv. Orphaned at a young age, he was forced to wander homeless as an adolescent, until he eventually headed east, crossing the vast expanse of Imperial Russia towards Siberia, and reunited with his older brothers in Vladivostok, on the coast of the Sea of Japan. There, Vasyl's eldest brother taught him how to read and write, which enabled Vasyl to gain employment at the naval base. This position allowed Avramenko to visit several major Asian ports as a crewman aboard Russian naval vessels; such worldly exposure encouraged in him a greater love of learning, and he returned to study with his brother whenever possible, eventually earning the qualifications to become a primary school teacher. It was during this time that Vasyl Avramenko saw a production of Ivan Kotlyarevsky's operetta Natalka Poltavka in Vladivostok in 1912, which Avramenko later recounted as having been the first experience of viewing his fellow Ukrainians on stage.

After passing his teacher's exams at Vladivostok men's gymnasium in 1915, the Russian Empire having already entered World War I, Avramenko was drafted into the Russian Imperial Army and assigned to the 4th Heavy Artillery Regiment. After two months' basic training, he was reassigned to the Irkutsk military school for ensigns, then onto the 35th Siberian Infantry Regiment in Tyumen which advanced from Irkutsk to Bryansk and to the Russian front. Here he was wounded and hospitalized, first in Minsk, then Petrograd, where he visited some of its theaters and became active in a troupe of military actors led by Yasha Vavrak, who grasped that Avramenko had a flair for the stage.

== Formative years ==
In Kyiv, in the summer of 1917, Avramenko attended three of Vasyl Verkhovynets' rare and irregularly scheduled lectures on Ukrainian folk dance, its choreography and stage performance, including theory and practical demonstrations. Verkhovynets' theories of Ukrainian dance, which he based on his theatrical training and his extensive research of the village dances of Central Ukraine, would inspire Avramenko to live the life of an artist. During this time, Avramenko took copious notes compiling a vocabulary of Ukrainian dances and dance steps, which he would later develop into his life's work. In his book, Ukrainian National Dances, Music, and Costumes, Avramenko acknowledged the work of Verkhovynets' and the Ukrainian theater in preserving and elevating the legacy of dance in Ukraine.

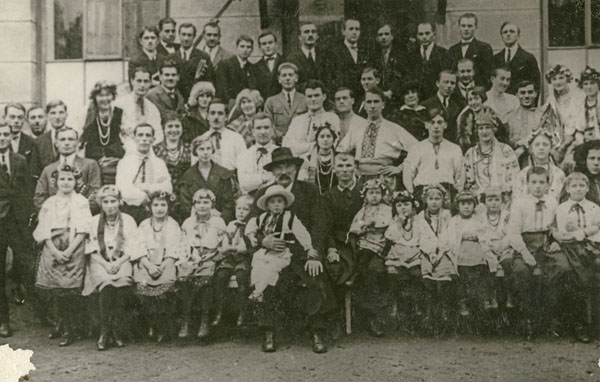
Avramenko with dancing school with the great Ukrainian artist Mykola Sadovsky.

By spring of 1919, Avramenko was for a short time in Stanyslaviv, a member of Yosyf Standnyk's theatre before joining Mykola Sadovsky's troupe. During this time, he was able to apply some of the lessons he had learned in the Lysenko Music and Drama School in Kyiv. In the fight between the Bolshevik and White Russian Armies, Avramenko served in the Central Telegraph Administration of the Ukrainian People's Republic. When UNR forces retreated west in 1919–20, he remained in Soviet occupied territory and worked with Ukrainian itinerant troupes of actors that continued to tour the region. He was arrested at this time and interned in Kalisz.

In February 1921, Avramenko established a school of Ukrainian folk dancing in the Kalisz camp, the first of more than 100 schools over the next 20 years across Europe and North America. He impressed on his pupils that Ukrainian folk dancing could be an art form. He began with 100 students (everyone from the guards to small children), teaching them the basic steps of Ukrainian dance, eventually teaching whole dances, and finally putting on a celebrated performance May 24.

In the fall of that year he met Oleksandr Koshyts. Koshyts remarked: "I was invited to attend a ballet performance by Avramenko's school. The ballet was marvellous: it was simply impossible to believe that such an exacting and artistic work could be created out of our dance!" Avramenko soon became so successful and popular that he set out on tour with a group of his students through Polish-ruled western Ukraine, often presenting demonstrations and workshops in the towns he visited, encouraging others to perform his dances and pass them on to still others. The tour passed through Lviv several times between 1922 and 1924, while also visiting Rivne, Lutsk, Kremenets, Oleksandriia, Mezhirich, Chełm, Brest-Litovsk, Stryi, Stanyslaviv, Kolomyia, Przemyśl, Deliatyn, Ternopil, and Drohobych.

== North America ==
December 1925, Avramenko arrived in Canada in Halifax, as a man with a mission; it being his determination to tour North America with dancers, singers, and instrumentalists to bring attention to the Ukrainian people and their fight for independence.

Eighty-five percent of Ukrainians in Canada at the time lived on the prairies. Avramenko decided to stay in Toronto, and opened his first dance school in North America in St. Mary's Roman Catholic hall, today the Factory Theatre building. For fees from five to thirty dollars, he offered a set of lessons for pre-schoolers to grown-ups. The school inculcated its pupils with Ukrainian pride and identity. His troupe first performed, the year after his arrival, at the Canadian National Exhibition (CNE) August 30 through September 11 to grandstands filled with up to twenty-five thousand spectators. When the dancers gave a special performance at the women's pavilion, Florence Randal Livesay spoke glowingly about Ukrainian folk dancing. Avaramenko's name now became coupled with that of Koshyts in the Ukrainian-Canadian press. Articles about him appeared in every major Ukrainian-Canadian newspaper, as well as the English ones.

Avramenko arrived in Winnipeg in January 1927. His troupe gave their first performance at the Canadian-Ukrainian Institute Prosvita hall at the corner of Pritchard and Arlington in Winnipeg's North-End. This publicized his arrival, and he opened a school shortly thereafter. By April 30, Avramenko and 275 of his pupils performed at Winnipeg's amphitheatre, a venue usually reserved for hockey and politics.

Avramenko's dances
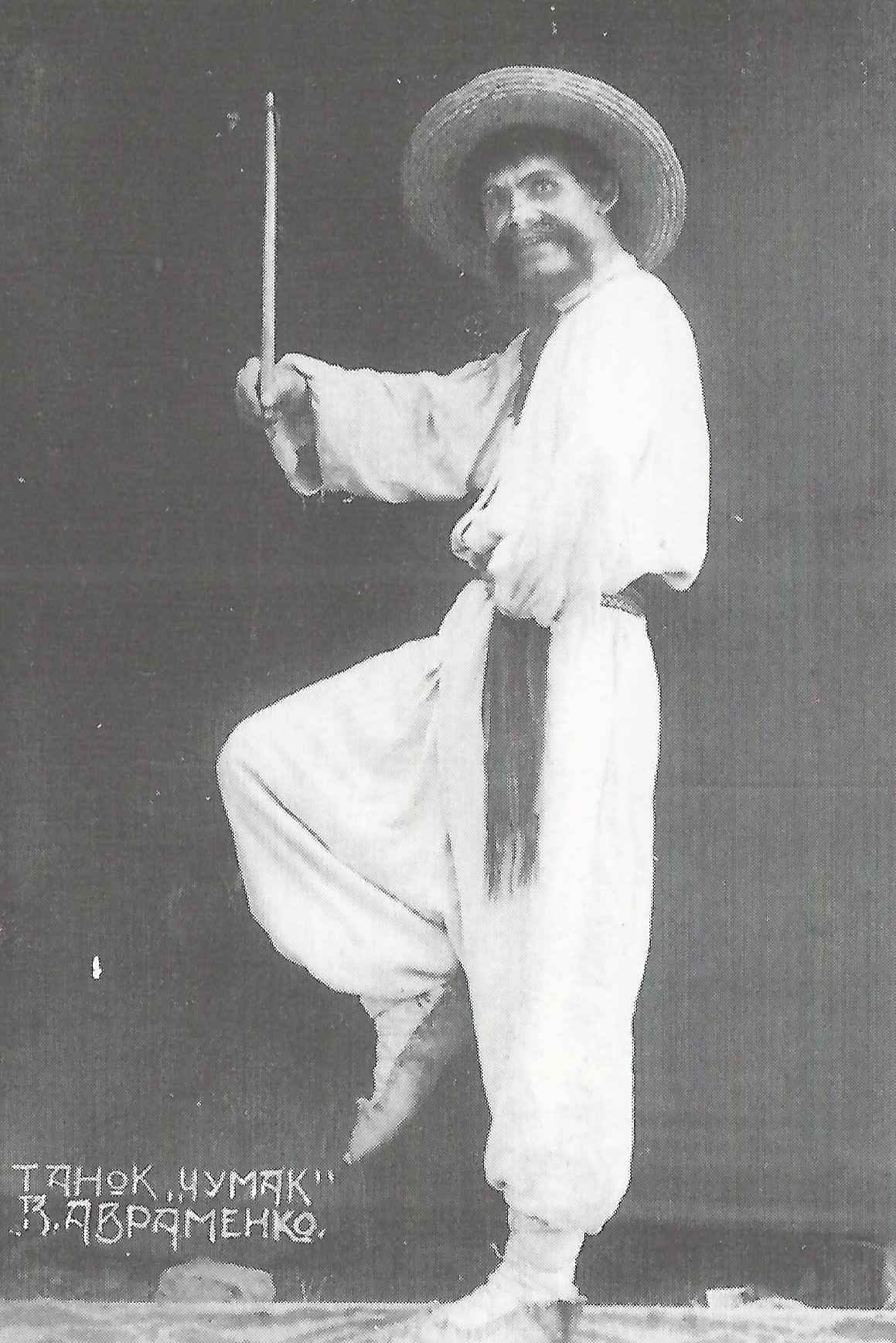
Avramenko’s ‘Chumak’ Solo Dance

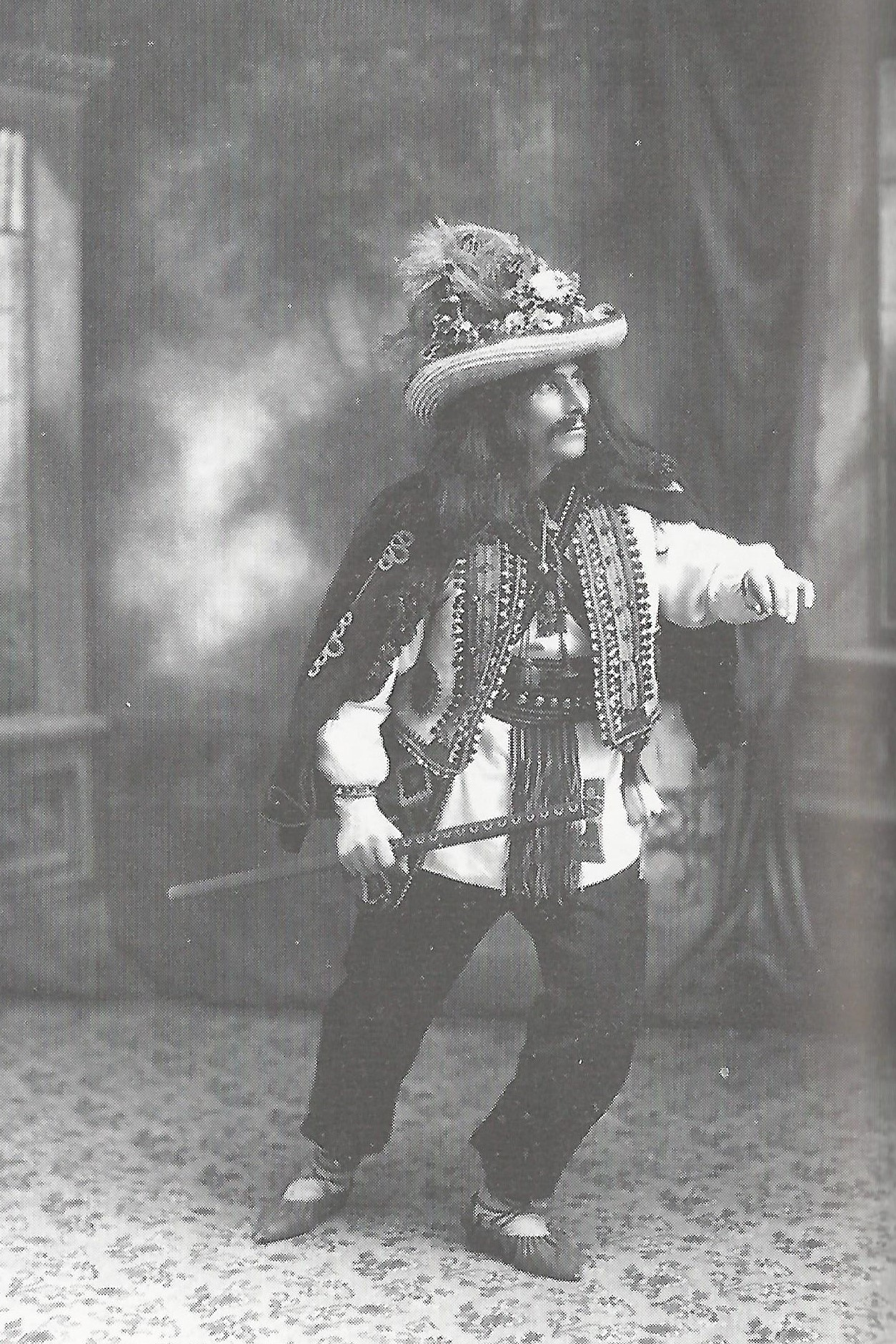
Avramenko’s ‘Dovbush’ Solo Dance

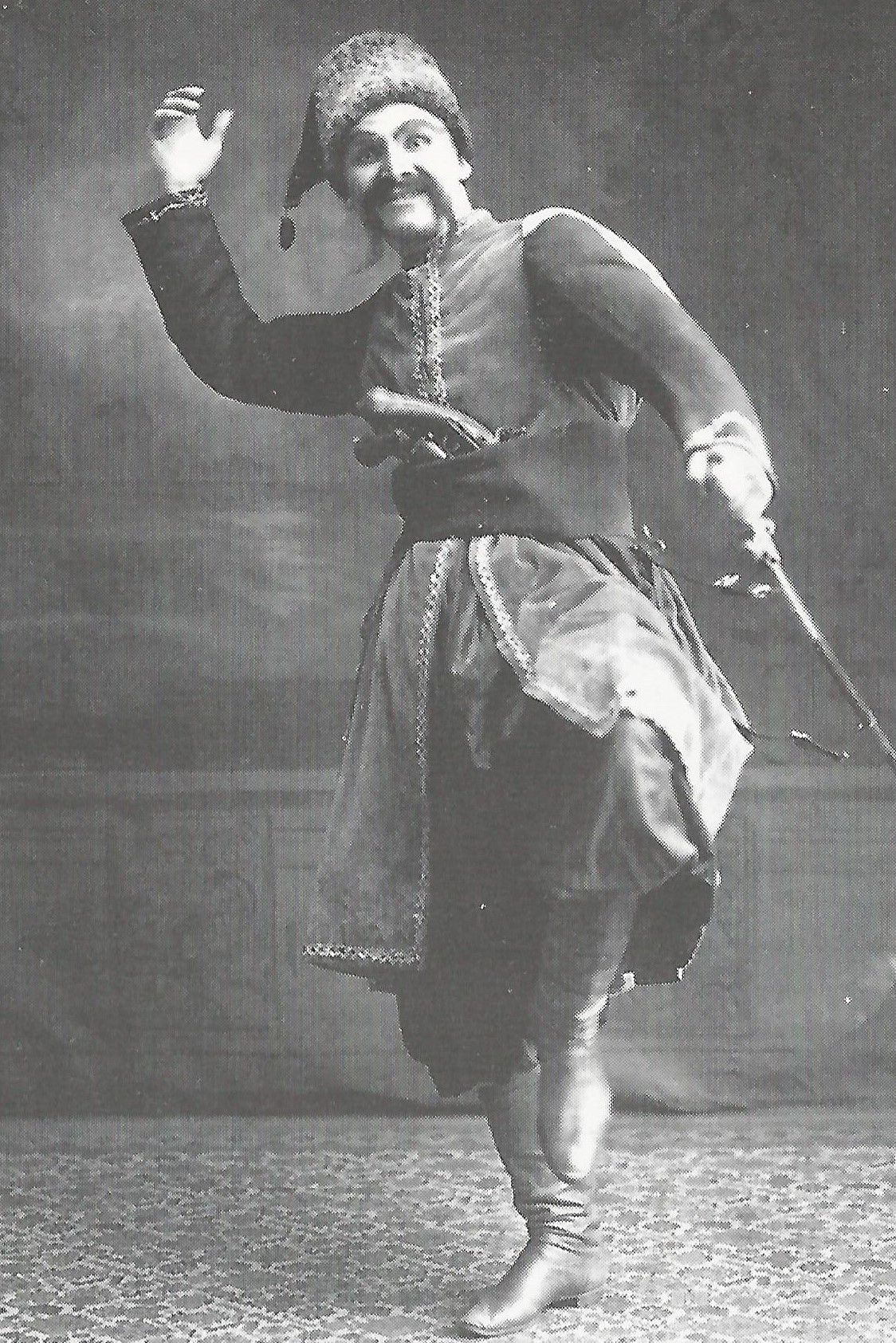
Avramenko’s ‘Gonta’ Solo Dance

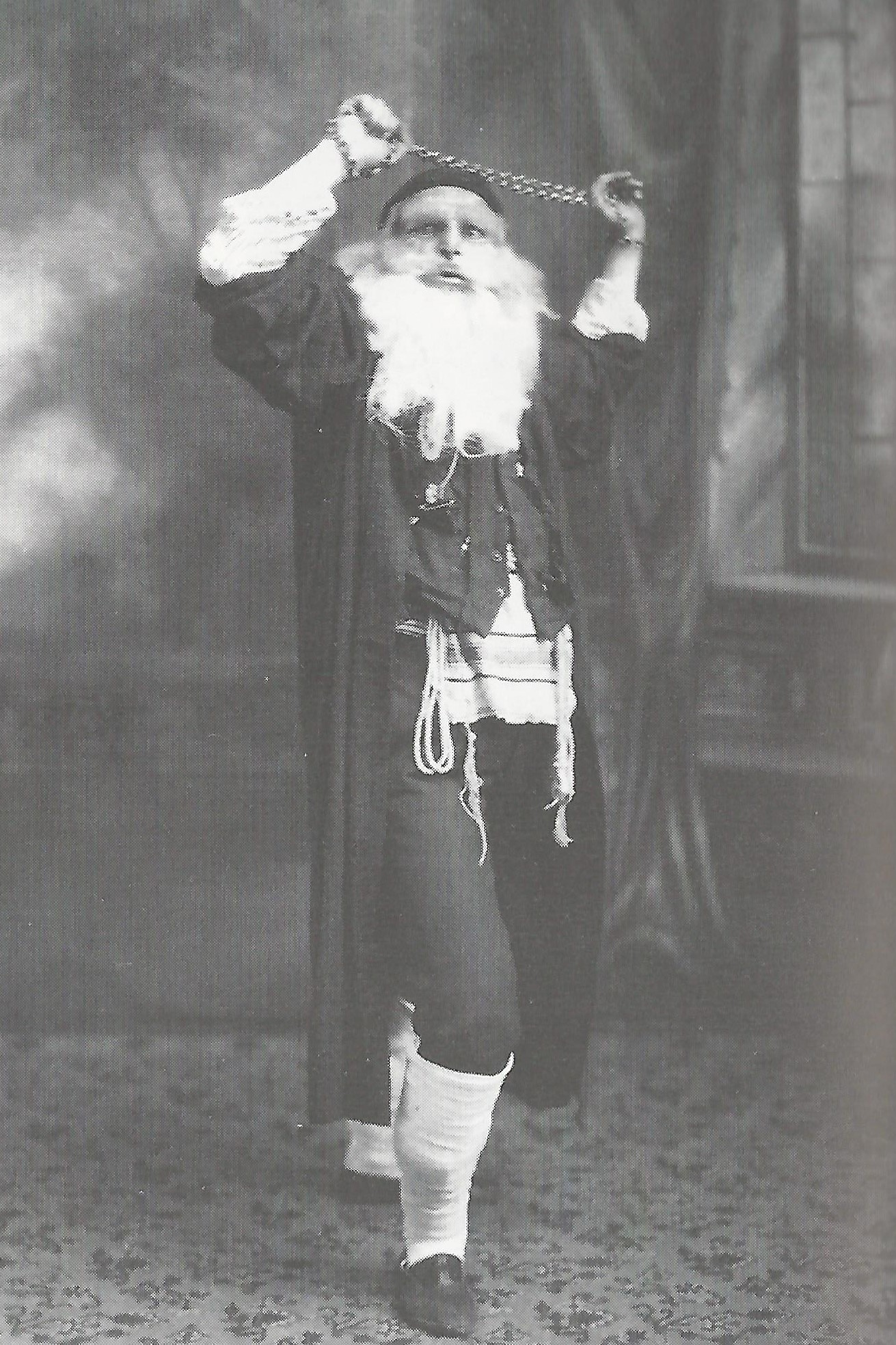
Avramenko’s ‘Israel’ Solo Dance

Avramenko and his disciples began to set up schools quickly across the prairies, in Saskatoon, Yorkton, and Edmonton. Their base of support was a strong Ukrainian-Canadian community. For example, some 20 Ukrainian public school teachers attended his Edmonton classes, and Avramenko gave them instructions on how to teach dance when they returned to their schools. Avramenko traveled from town to town, teaching the same dances. When he was finished teaching in a town, he would assign a leader to continue teaching to the residents. One of these leaders was Chester Kuc, who founded the Ukrainian Shumka Dancers in 1959, and Cheremosh Ukrainian Dance Company in 1969.

On June 16, 1928, Avramenko married one of his star dance pupils, Pauline Garbolinsky, from Winnipeg, and soon the couple was living in New York City. With a network of dance schools across Canada, Avramenko now turned his sites to the United States. Lacking business acumen, he had debts in excess of three thousand dollars upon leaving Canada.

New York at this time was a creative center for drama, song, and dance. Eugene O'Neill was having his plays produced. George Gershwin was writing musicals here. Martha Graham had just opened a school of contemporary dance. Vasile and Pauline Avramenko lived in rented rooms on 8th Avenue in Brooklyn. Avramenko set up his school in Little Ukraine in Manhattan, Greenwich Village to the west of it, and the Lower East Side with a Ukrainian enclave to the east. Able to dispense with live music with the arrival of the phonograph and vinyl records, it became easier for him in the 1930s to offer these lessons. Within a few months he had over 500 pupils attending.

Paying dance instructors over widely dispersed areas across Canada and the United States, as well as for rental spaces for his schools, perpetuated his financial woes. To clear up these troubles, Avramenko turned to the idea of staging his work on Broadway. His successes up to now had been solely in the Ukrainian community. His first attempt to reach beyond it was at the Star Casino, and was disrupted by a summer storm that hit the city. His second attempt was at the Metropolitan Opera, with 500 dancers, a chorus of 100 singers, and a folk orchestra, all dressed in Ukrainian costume. The New York Evening Post gave it a rave review, "…excited over the kaleidoscopic ardors of the dance, the richness of the chorus, the congeniality of the audience and the fairly inspiring naturalness of what really amounted to a brilliant Ukrainian folk festival." The Ukrainian newspapers, like Svoboda, saw the performance as a well-attended artistic failure. In a venue like the Met, where the great operas of the world were performed by the finest singers, the Ukrainian press had expected those values to be reflected in the premiere of a comparable Ukrainian operetta or musical. Instead, they found themselves seeing more of what they, unlike the larger English community, were already familiar with from Avramenko. His debts increased, and in order to address his finances, he turned to film.

== Film producer ==
By October 1933, Avramenko was in Hollywood. Along the way to the west coast, he obtained loans and donations from Ukrainian immigrants in these far-flung communities, only aware of who he was through what they had read, unaware as yet of his inability to handle finances. Avramenko always claimed to have been offered a lucrative contract to dance in the film Catherine the Great starring Marlene Dietrich, but had refused on the grounds that the dances would be billed as 'Russian' dances.

He staged performances at the Chicago World's Fair of 1933, and borrowed a thousand dollars from his father-in-law to do so. In 1935, his Baltimore pupils participated in the White House Easter Egg Roll and he claimed a victory for the Ukrainian cause and published postcards with photos of Eleanor Roosevelt at the event.

=== Natalka Poltavka ===
On the road most of the time, leaving behind his wife with their newly born daughter, with little if anything to live on, so that his wife depended on friends to survive, by 1934, his marriage began to fall apart. The Great Depression made it hard to earn a living running dance schools. Avramenko made plans to produce a feature film based on the oldest and most popular Ukrainian operetta, Natalka Poltavka, convinced that it would bring fame and glory to the Ukrainian cause. He rallied wealthy widows and convinced them that people in their community needed a place to apprentice in film. The Avramenko Film Company was established in New York City in 1936. Having raised enough money, twenty-five thousand dollars, to begin production, fortuitously Edgar G. Ulmer, a real Hollywood film director appeared on the scene. Ulmer had lost favour in Hollywood after running off with the wife of the nephew of Carl Laemmle Sr., who owned Universal Studios.

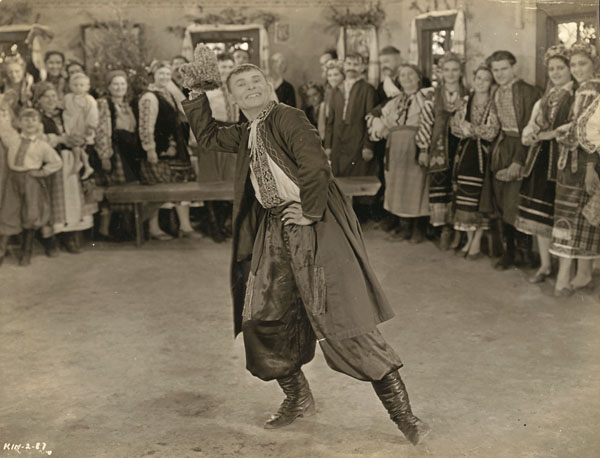
Film still, from "Natalka Poltavka." Vasile Avramenko, in costume, doffs his hat during a dance sequence.

Ulmer put together a film crew and rewrote the screenplay. The musical score was recorded ahead of time at Reeves Sound Studio in New York City. The set was located on a farm northwest of Trenton, New Jersey. Ulmer said of Avramenko: "Nothing was impossible for Avramenko… The man was so enthusiastic. I couldn't say no to him…. He was the spark of everything." Without a Hollywood distributor, the film company rented theatres at high cost to show the film. In the end, though an artistic success, the film left Avramenko in further debt. Koshyts was particularly critical of the film, finding it offensive and tasteless. Not surprisingly, his review appeared in Svoboda. It sounded very much like a personal attack. No doubt Avramenko's personality had got under Koshyts' skin when they had toured together. Koshyts' criticism was not without merit. Avramenko, despite his rhetoric to develop a Ukrainian film industry, had brought in people and resources from outside the community in order to make the film. In fairness though to Avramenko, these resources did not exist in the Ukrainian community at that time. This was the first Ukrainian language film produced in the United States.

=== Cossacks in Exile ===
Unable to raise money in New York due to the financial setback of his last film, he turned to Canada to raise the funds for his next feature film Cossacks in Exile. On September 22, 1937, Avramenko returned to Winnipeg, and announced the creation of the Ukrainian Film Corporation. At this distance from New York, audiences had seen and loved his film Natalka Poltavka, but knew nothing about the questionable financial state in which it had left its shareholders, and Avramenko. Appealing unabashedly to patriotic Ukrainian sentiment, Avramenko sold rights to screen the new film province by province. Rumours circulated that he was using these funds to pay off old debts. Dr. Mykyta Mandryka, the secretary-treasurer of the new company seemed to be the only one to fully appreciate the situation, and wrote a letter to Avramenko. "We really do not understand each other, and this is why: you think it is necessary, above all, to start producing the film with or without money, and you believe things will somehow turn out well. You live on high hopes and faith in an imminent miracle. But that is not enough to handle people's money wisely." Avramenko ignored all advice and continued to ask for donations, borrow money, and sell rights, fundraising the way he had always done.

Filming began the first week of May 1938. It ended November 27 and the director Ulmer was pleased with the final product. His cheerful mood though turned when he saw advertising for the movie, identifying Avramenko as the "director" or "general production director". He stormed into the film company's office, clearly having failed to appreciate the size of Avramenko's ego.

Again, with Ulmer having directed it, the film received great reviews. In Winnipeg, filled with civic pride, the critics were unashamedly enthusiastic. The New York Times did not even notice that it was a Canadian production, stating that it was "highly agreeable both to the eye and the ear." Koshyts did not publish any review of it, but privately was very critical. With no American or international distributor the film fell victim, like the previous, to being shown city by city at a high cost for theatre rental wherever theatres could be obtained.

== Later life ==
The remaining years of his life, Avramenko spent hauling around film canisters, showing his films or outright selling them wherever he disembarked. In 1954 he released the documentary film "The Triumph of Ukrainian Dance", consisting primarily of excerpts from documentaries and feature films produced by him during the 1930s.

In postwar Canada between 1945 and 1947, Avramenko offered Ukrainian folk dancing courses. One of his students in Winnipeg at this time was William Kurelek, nineteen at the time. By the mid-1960s folk dance ensembles were reinventing themselves: Rusalka in Winnipeg, Yevshan in Saskatoon, Shumka in Edmonton, as well as the touring ensembles from the Soviet Union, the State Folk Dance Ensemble of the Ukrainian Soviet Socialist Republic under Pavlo Virsky. They were interested in preserving the spirit of the folk dance rather than preserving traditional dance steps. Avramenko's concerts juxtaposed against these dances were simply a bit of nostalgia.

During the 1960s Avramenko spent time in Australia, teaching dance at a number of Ukrainian schools, particularly around Melbourne.

Towards the very end of his life, Avramenko created tribute events, for example "Ukrainian Tribute to Australia", and celebrations of some of his personal triumphs and milestones, and rallied the Ukrainian community around them. He had many of his former pupils across North America, and around the world, help him with these events, pupils who had been children when first encountering dance lessons with him. In the end, even the Ukrainian language newspaper Svoboda and he reconciled, as he lived out his old age in New York City, and whenever he entered their offices on his birthday, everyone would sing Mnohaya lita.

Avramenko died on May 6, 1981, in New York.

== Bibliography ==
In English

- Bogdanovich, Peter. Edgar G. Ulmer: An Interview, Film Culture, 1974.
- Halich, Wasyl. Ukrainians in the United States,(1970), Ayer Publishing.
- Martynowych, Orest T. "'All That Jazz!' The Avramenko Phenomenon in Canada, 1925-1929" in Journal of Ukrainian Studies 28, No.2 (Winter 2003). Canadian Institute of Ukrainian Studies. ISSN 0228-1635.
- Martynowych, Orest T. The showman and the Ukrainian cause. University of Manitoba Press, Winnipeg, Manitoba, 2014.
- Nahachewsky, Andriy. "Avramenko and the Paradigm of National Culture" in Journal of Ukrainian Studies 28, No.2 (Winter 2003). Canadian Institute of Ukrainian Studies. ISSN 0228-1635.
- Shatulsky, Myron (1980). The Ukrainian Folk Dance, Kobzar Publishing Co. Ltd. ISBN 0-9692078-5-9.
- Subtelny, Orest. Ukrainians in North America, An Illustrated History. University of Toronto Press, Toronto 1991.
- Swyripa, Frances and Thompson, John Herd, editors. Ukrainians in Canada During The Great War, Canadian Institute of Ukrainian Studies, University of Alberta, Edmonton, 1983.
- Zerebecky, Bohdan (1985). Ukrainian Dance Resource Booklets, Series I-IV, Ukrainian Canadian Committee, Saskatchewan Provincial Council.

In Ukrainian

- Avramenko, Vasyl (1947). Ukrainian National Dances, Music, and Costumes (Українські Національні Танки, Музика, і Cтрій), National Publishers, Ltd.
- Pihuliak, Ivan (1979). Wasyl Avramenko and the Rebirth of Ukrainian National Dancing, Part 1 (Василь Авраменко та Відродження Українського Танку, Частина Перша), published by the author.
