= Kolomyika =

Music genre and type of dance

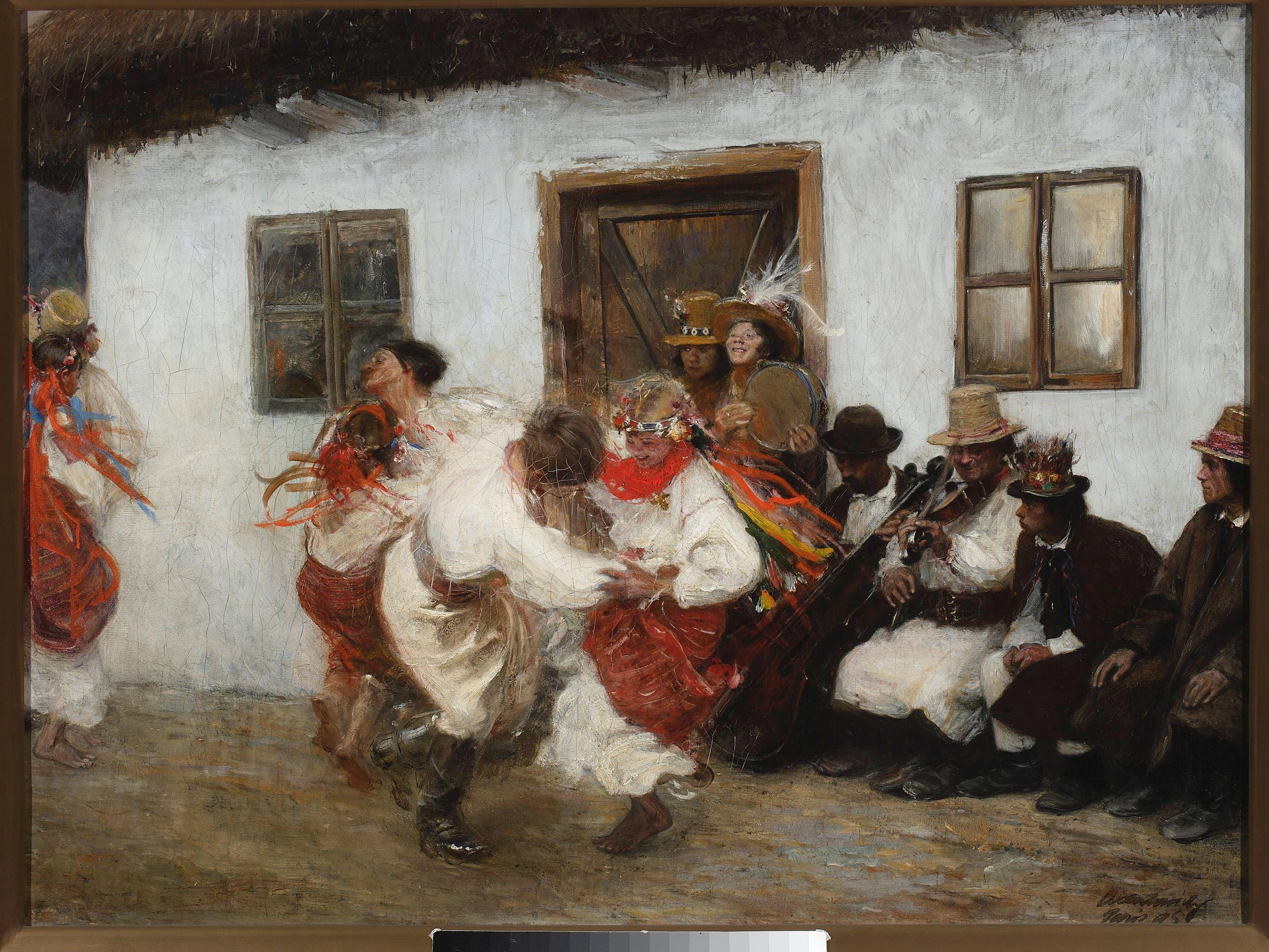
Kolomyika by Teodor Axentowicz

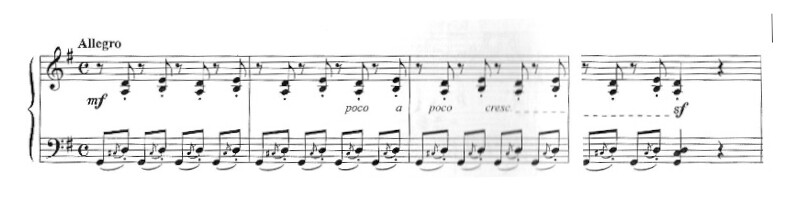
Notes of a typical kolomyika tune

The kolomyika (Ukrainian: кoлoмийкa, Polish: kołomyjka; also spelled kolomeyka or kolomeike) is a Hutsul (Ukrainian) music genre that combines a fast-paced folk dance and comedic rhymed verses (танець-приспівка). It includes a type of performance dance developed by the Ukrainian diaspora in North America.

It is named after the town of Kolomyia, in the Hutsul region of east Galicia, in what is now part of western Ukraine. It was historically popular among the Ukrainians and Poles, and is also known (as the kalamajka) in north-eastern Slovakia where some Ukrainians settled in Austro-Hungarian times.

Kolomyikas are still danced in Ukraine and Poland as a tradition on certain holidays, during festivities, or simply for fun. In Ukraine's west, they are popular dances for weddings.

== Structure ==
The kolomyika can be a combination of tune, song, and dance with some recordings having a line of singing alternating with a line of instrumental melody, whilst others are purely instrumental. The text tends to be in rhyming couplets and is a humorous commentary on everyday life. Its simple 2/4 rhythm and structures make the kolomyika very adaptable, and the text and melodies of thousands of different versions have been annotated. One collection done by Volodymyr Shukhevych in 1905, contains more than 8,000. Although a very old form they continue to be popular due to their fast, energetic, and exciting melodies, often with syncopation.

A dance similar to kolomyika is hutsulka. Hutsulkas have a faster rhythm than kolomyikas and originated later, approximately in 16th century. Hutsulka or kozachok often constitutes the final phase of a dance, after the kolomyika has reached its climax.

== Verse ==
The kolomyika-style verse of the song is syllabic, consisting of two lines of 14 syllables (or of four lines: 8 + 6 + 8 + 6). This is typical not only for a kolomyika, but also for historical, everyday, ballad, and other Ukrainian folk songs. It was very often used by Taras Shevchenko.

The National Anthem of Ukraine was also written in kolomyika verse.

== History of study ==
The specificity of kolomyika was once determined by the folklorist F. Kolessa:

Kolomyika is originally a dance song, which is still sung before dancing, and has become a favorite form of lyric song in Western Ukraine, especially in Pokutia, where it has gradually supplanted other song forms. It has a dance character and a free combination of stanzas of common or related content, sometimes based only on a closer or further association of thoughts and poetic images."

Its name indicates the place of fixation: the city of Kolomyia, Stanisławów, now Ivano-Frankivsk region in the vicinity of Hutsul-populated areas of the Carpathians. Kolomyia has been historically popular among Poles, Ukrainians and is also known (dance) in northeastern Slovenia (as kalamajka).

The size of the kolomyika (only two lines in which the words should be placed so that each line had fourteen syllables) contributed to the development of conciseness, stable poetic formulas, economic and accurate use of tropes.

Kolomyikas have a two-dimensional structure: the image of nature of the first line by analogy or contrast enhances the semantic and emotional meaning of the thought expressed in the second line. Sometimes the first line acts as a traditional spice, the content of which is not always related to the next line. Most often it is the beginning "Oh, the cuckoo flew (peacock, swallow)", "On a high wormwood", "Oh, green oak" and others.

== The content of kolomyika ==
Complaints about forced labor, bitter soldiering, poor breadlessness, forced emigration, protest against peasant lawlessness, and rebellious prayers are heard in the kolomyika about the people's past. The largest array of songs are on "eternal themes" which includes personal life, experiences, and moods throughout social life, thereby being applicable to any time period. eighbors, its social condition, its public and individual life from a cradle to a grave, its traditions and beliefs, its social and ethnic ideals.

== Research and evaluation of kolomyika ==
The first known records of kolomyika specimens date back to the 17th century, but there is documentary evidence of their existence in ancient times. This original variety of Ukrainian folk songs has long attracted the attention of Slavic scholars. Beginning in the first third of the 19th century, translations of kolomyikas and scientific investigations into them appeared in the Ukrainian, Russian, and Polish press. Serious studies devoted to this genre belong to I. Franko, F. Kolessa, V. Hnatyuk, M. Zhynyk, M. Hrinchenko and other folklorists.

Hnatyuk advised writers to learn to create highly artistic images in Kolomyia, using the vernacular, its characteristic inversions, comparisons. Ideological and aesthetic qualities of kolomyikas were highly appreciated by Lesya Ukrainka and M. Kotsyubynsky. Kolomyikas inspired themes, images, motives for many literary works. They are especially organic in the stories and novels of I. Franko, L. Martovych, P. Kozlanyuk.

== Bela Bartok and the Kolomyika ==
Hungarian composer Bela Bartok's first concerto for piano and orchestra incorporates a rhythmic and melodic scheme that has a symmetrical structure, combining two measure units, that move typically in a narrow stepwise motion and often use scalar patterns and note repetitions. In Hungary, this rhythmic type is associated with the swineherd dance that Bartok believed was derived from the Ukrainian kolomyika. Bartok also considered the swineherd songs to be the source of the popular kuruc song repertoire and of the instrumental verbunkos (recruiting song and dance tye), suggesting that these too were based on kolomyika melodies: "the latter (Verbunkos), again, seems at least partially a derivation from the so-called Hungarian Shepherd dance melodies whose source is probably the Ukrainian Kolomyjka dance-songs" (Bela Bartok), "Concerning the origin of the Rumanian (b) 1 and (c) types, let us indicate two alternatives, however, in principle equally possible. They may have originated directly from either the Verbunkos music or the Ukrainian Kolomyjka. The latter alternative is likely because of the comparatively long frontier between Rumanian and Ukrainian linguistic territory." (Bela Bartok)

== Development in the diaspora ==
According to Andriy Nahachewsky, a former professional stage dancer, Director of the Kule Centre for Ukrainian and Canadian Folklore, and Huculak Chair of Ukrainian Culture and Ethnography at the University of Alberta, kolomyiky as practised in Canada are a separate genre of dance from what is known in Ukraine. The diasporic kolomyika developed from the old country folk dance but with a prevailing influence from stage dancing. Originating in Western Canada in the 1950s and 60s, the kolomyika is considered the highlight of Ukrainian weddings and dances in Canada: when any attendees who have experience as stage dancers perform their favourite "tricks" involving lifts, spins, high kicks, even building human pyramids. It is a chance for individuals and groups to "show off" their most impressive or dangerous moves so as to entertain the audience and win approval. Nahachewsky suggests that despite being a relatively new tradition the Canadian kolomyika is an important symbol of Ukrainian culture in Canada and that the dynamism of this type of Ukrainian dance helps to interest young people in Canada in retaining Ukrainian culture.

== Performers ==
- Ruslana performs Kolomyika motifs through folk pop songs

== See also ==
Related dances:

- Arkan (dance)
- Kozachok
- Kolo (dance)

Similar song types

- Bećarac
- Chastushka
