= Kozachok =

Traditional Russian, Belarusian, and Ukrainian folk dance

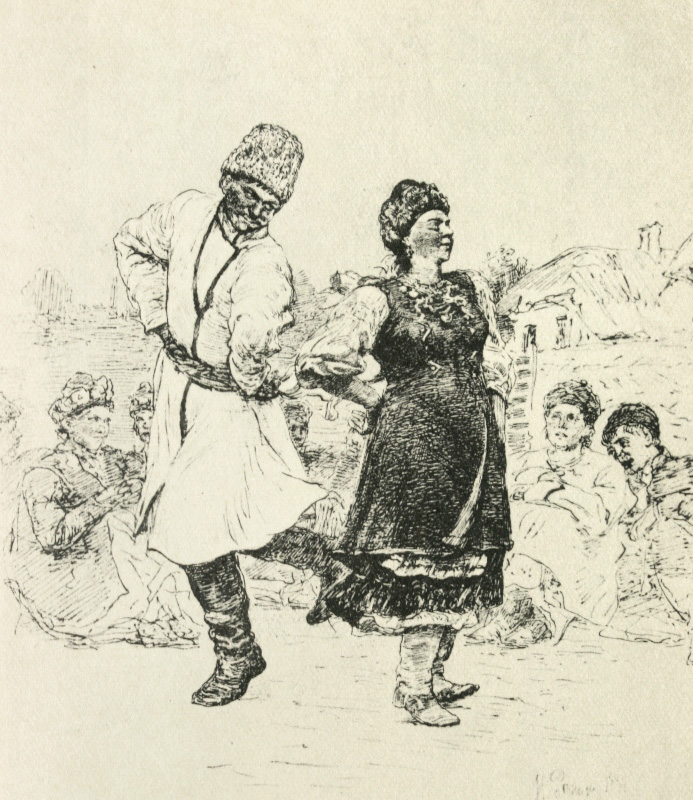
- Native name: Козачок
- Genre: Folk dance
- Time signature: 2/4

A 1904 recording of Kozachok Polianka performed by Hnat Honcharenko, from the collection of Filaret Kolessa

Kozachok (Ukrainian: козачок, pronounced [kozɐˈtʃɔk]) or kazachok (Russian: казачок, pronounced [kəzɐˈtɕɵk]) is a traditional Ukrainian, Belarusian and Russian quick-paced folk dance for couples originating with the Cossacks in the 16th century. In the 17th and 18th centuries, it was performed throughout Ukraine, Belarus and South Russia in various local varieties. From the 18th century, it was as well performed at noble courts including in France, Hungary, Poland, and Russia.

== Description ==
Kozachok is a fast, linear, couple-dance in 2/4 time, typically in a constantly increasing tempo and of an improvisatory character. In the 17th century, kozachok became fashionable in court music in Europe. It is typically in a minor key in Ukraine, and in a major key in Russia. The woman leads and the man follows, imitating her figures – she signals movement changes by hand clapping. Traditionally, it is accompanied by a pryspivka, a short, jovial, humorous song.

In terms of music, Kozachok is in fact a group of "Kozachok-type dances", with numerous regional varieties, especially in Carpathians, under different names: "Kozak", "Haiduk", "Dzhuman", "Metanka", etc. At least 124 different melodies are recorded. Kozachok-type dances play the function of "dance-songs" (танець-приспівка) in most of ethnic Ukrainian lands, with the exception of "kolomyika" regions (Pokuttia, Boiko Subcarpathians, and Halychyna).

In Russia, there exist different versions of the kozachok dance the Kuban kazachok (Krasnodar region of southern Russia), and Terek kazachok (northern Caucasus region). Historically these regions had an important Ukrainian population which was significantly reduced in the Soviet era. The first known musical arrangement of the kоzachok for lute is attributed to the Polish nobleman and composer Kazimierz Stanisław Rudomina-Dusiacki in the 17th century. There are manuscript collections of kozachok melodies from the second half of the 18th century, and printed collections begin to appear toward the end of that century. Dusiacki's score was preserved in the Berlin State Library under the name "Dusiacki-Buch".

Kozachok melodies were used in Polish music in the 18th century.

== Modern choreography ==
The Ukrainian choreographer and dancer Vasyl Avramenko, known for his standardization of Ukrainian dance, created Kozachok Podilskyi (Козачок подільський), a Cossack courtship dance native to the Podillia region, for one to four couples. He most likely learned the Kozachok Podilskyi from the theatre work he did between 1917 and 1921, sources from the repertoire of dances performed in plays generations before including plays by Ukrainian dramaturge and writer Marko Kropyvnytskyi.

== See also ==
- Hopak, a Ukrainian folk dance that originated among the Zaporozhian Cossacks
