= Combat Hopak =

Ukrainian Cossack martial art

Combat/Boyovyy Hopak
- Also known as: Бойовий гопак, Boyovyi Hopak, Boyovyy Hopak
- Focus: various
- Hardness: Full contact, semi contact, light contact
- Country of origin: Ukraine
- Creator: systematised & codified by Volodymyr Pylant in 1985
- Famous practitioners: Kateryna Tarnovska (founder of Asgarda)
- Parenthood: Hopak and other traditional Ukrainian dances, Ukrainian folk wrestling, Ukrainian fistfighting, Cossack combat
- Descendant arts: Asgarda
- Olympic sport: No

Combat Hopak (also Boyovyy Hopak, Boyovyi Hopak from Ukrainian: Бойовий гопак) is a Cossack martial art from Ukraine. It was systematised and codified in 1985 by Volodymyr Pylat (a descendant of a Cossack family from western Ukraine). It can be trained in light, semi and full contact formulae. Combat Hopak includes techniques of traditional Ukrainian folk fist fighting, folk wrestling, Cossack sabre fencing, and Cossack war dances like the hopak and the Povzunets (Cossack dance centered around crawling and squat position movements) and the metelytsia. Combat Hopak practitioners wear traditional Ukrainian embroidered shirts, wide long cloth belt and Sharavary. Combat Hopak fighters also wear shoes like practitioners of Savate and perform kicks while wearing them.

== Ukraine ==
In Ukraine, schools of Combat Hopak are present in most parts of country. Students of this martial art take part in tournaments in cossack free fighting, kickboxing, wrestling, and MMA formulas in Ukraine.

== Outside Ukraine ==
It has schools in Poland, Canada, the United States, Germany, Portugal.

Combat Hopak team was representing the style during Chungju World Martial Arts Festival in 2001.

In 2019 representation of Combat Hopak toured France.

== Subtypes of Combat Hopak ==
Combat Hopak can be trained in 4 ways:

- Оздоровчий (Fitness) — as a form of gymnastics for health improvement
- Фольклорно-мистецький (Theatrical) — preparations of forms for stage shows and presentations
- Спортивний (Sport) — as regular contact sport for kickboxing, wrestling and MMA sport tournaments
- Бойовий (Combat) — military grade hand-to-hand and weapon combat.

== Systems - descendants of Combat Hopak ==
- Asgarda (officially formed in 2004)

== In popular culture ==
- Choreography of dancers in Ruslana's entry in Eurovision Song Contest 2004 included elements of Combat Hopak. Also video clips aired during Eurovision Song Contest 2005 intermissions were including presentations of Combat Hopak by adepts of the style.
- Ukrainian group Tartak video clip for their song "Nashe Lito" includes practitioners of Combat Hopak presenting technique.

== See also ==
- Flying kick
