= Arcan (dance) =

Type of dance

The Arcan is the name of a custom, and of the associated popular dance and melody, of Romania. It is sometimes also called laţ or pripon, meaning "lasso"/"tether" or "aiguillette". There is a version called Arcanul bătrânesc, which is a slow arcan danced in the Moldavian region of Romania. Bătrân means both "ancient or "old" and it is commonly used as an attribute of dances from all over Romania.

== Ritual ==
The dance, performed by amateurs, professional ensembles, as well as other performers of folk dances, is traditionally performed by men, and takes place around a burning bonfire. The word arcan also refers to the step that the men perform while dancing around the fire: the right foot steps to the side (or double stamps as the dance builds momentum), the left foot crosses behind, the right foot steps to the side again, and the left foot is hopped in front of the dancer with a bent knee; the dance is performed with the men's arms upon one another's shoulders, and is part of the larger group of circle dances called hora.

The "custom" label is given to the arcan by the fact that it has a rite of passage character: like the căluşari, it is to be danced only by boys old enough to marry (dressed in traditional Romanian costumes). Taking part in the dance is sometimes also called "a lua cu forţa" ("to forcefully summon" or "to grab"), or a arcăni ("to lasso") - it has an etymological parallel in the favored method of conscription in the defense forces of Early Modern Wallachia and Moldavia, a lua cu arcanul ("to lasso with the arkan"), whereby boys were selectively kiddnapped by the authorities. The reason for this apparent "violent" character of the dance is its initiating value, of entering into the next step of the social pyramid, by which boys become marriageable young men. It refers to the strategy adopted by the "established" men, led by an authority figure, forcibly (with a ritualistic force) taking the boys (at that time still considered children) to the hora, and dancing this particular variation of the hora.

The arcan ritual dance was a necessary condition for a young men to be allowed to participate later on in a căluşari ritual dance. All of these requirements and means of organising the groups of young men are related to the so-called Lex Antiqua Valachorum (the ancient Vlach law).

== Verses ==
The dance is accompanied by specific verses. For example:

Arcaneaua, brâul verde,
Vai, că bine i se şede,
I se şede cui se şede,
Codrului cu frunza verde.

Approximate translation: "Arkan, green belt, / Oh, it suits him well, / It suits whom it suits, / [It suits] the green-leafed forest". The "green belt" is a kind of belt used by men to identify themselves as having emerged from adolescence and having become eligible. A man who has danced the arcan is sometimes called arcănit ("arkaned"), bun de oi ("good for sheep", i.e. good to be a shepherd), bun de însurat ("good to be married").

As the dance progresses, some repetitive recitations are to be shouted. These are meant to give choreographic directions and codify the dance description:

Trii bătute, trii,
Trii să le punem,
Trii să le bătem,
Trii şi pentru mine,
Trii şi pentru tine;
Încă trii că n-o fost bune,
Alte trii pe loc le-om pune;
Trii bătute, trii gătite,
Un genunche şi-nainte.

or

Tot acelea trii,
Trii pentru Ilii.

Once the boy had danced the Arcan, he is acknowledged by the whole community as belonging to the eligible group of men - this is conditioned by precision in performing the dance. Hence, there is yet another group of verses, cautioning the participants:

Foaie verde papanaş,
Câte-un pinten, fecioraş.
Luaţi sama, feciori, bine,
Să nu păţim vreo ruşine,
Că ne văd cele copile.

Translation (approximation): "Green leaf harefoot, / A spur at a time, virgin boy, / Take good care, virgin boys, / Not to disgrace ourselves, / Because the girls are watching us".

== Influence ==
In 1908, a Romanian dance group danced the arcan in Vienna, and in 1937 in London, both times having won prizes from the organisers for their performance. At Humor Monastery (see Painted churches of northern Moldavia) built in 1530, there is a fresco which shows arcan dancers accompanied by a lăutar.

The dance was also brought to southwestern Ukraine by the Hutsuls, a Ukrainian ethnic subgroup. In Ukraine, the dance is called Arkan, but also Arcan. The Ukrainian Eurovision Song Contest 2004 winner Ruslana Lyzhichko, who is of Hutsul origin, successfully used traditional Hutsul sounds and moves on her "Wild Dances" album, which included a so-called arkan song.

== See also ==
- Arkan (dance)
- Music of Romania
- Romanian folklore
