= Pavlo Virsky =

Ukrainian ballet dancer and choreographer (1905–1975)

People's Artist Pavlo Virsky
- Павло Вірський
- Born: 25 February 1905; Odesa, Russian Empire (now Ukraine)
- Died: 5 July 1975 (aged 70); Kyiv, Ukrainian SSR, Soviet Union (now Ukraine)
- Awards: Shevchenko National Prize (1965)

Pavlo Pavlovych Virsky (Ukrainian: Павло Павлович Вірський; 25 February 1905 – 5 July 1975) was a Soviet and Ukrainian dancer, ballet master, choreographer, and founder of the Pavlo Virsky Ukrainian National Folk Dance Ensemble, whose work in Ukrainian dance was groundbreaking and influenced generations of dancers.

== Early days ==
Pavlo Virsky was born on February 25, 1905, in Odesa, Russian Empire. After graduating from the Odesa Music and Drama School in 1927, he continued his studies in Moscow, at the Theater Tekhnikum, from 1927 to 1928. Beginning in 1925, state theaters began to be organized throughout the Ukrainian SSR, allowing for gainful employment for artists, and upon his return to Odesa in 1928, Virsky joined the Odesa Opera and Ballet Theatre as a dancer and choreographer. It was at this theater that he collaborated with Mykola Bolotov in their first joint production: Glière's The Red Poppy. Virsky left Odesa in 1931, and worked as a ballet master at various theatres, including those in Kharkiv, Dnipropetrovsk, and Kyiv, working on productions of ballets such as Raymonda, La Esmeralda, Le Corsaire, Swan Lake, and Don Quixote.

== Folk dance ==
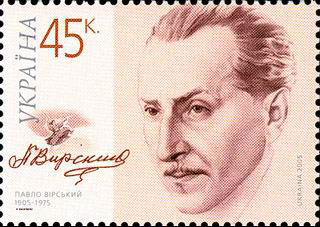
Stamp of Pavlo Virsky. 4/02/2005

The Kyiv Opera and Ballet brought two productions to Moscow in 1936 as part of the first festival of Ukrainian Literature and Art: Mykola Lysenko's opera Natalka Poltavka, and Semen Hulak-Artemovsky's opera Zaporozhets za Dunayem (A Zaporizhian [Kozak] Beyond the Danube), the latter which included choreographed Ukrainian folk dances by Pavlo Virsky and Mykola Bolotov. The following year, Virsky and Bolotov founded the State Folk Dance Ensemble of the Ukrainian SSR, with which they developed an entire program of staged Ukrainian folk dances. With the outbreak World War II, and in the build-up to the German-Soviet War, many ensembles suspended activity, as performers were enlisted to entertain the troops. Virsky continued his work with folk-themed choreography as the director of the Red Flag Song and Dance Ensemble of the Kyiv Military District beginning in 1939. In 1942, he left as that ensemble, and became the artistic director of the Red Army Song and Dance Ensemble dancers, and remained in that post for many years.

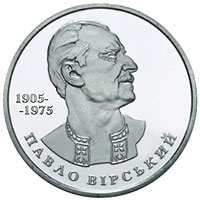
Jubilee Coin dedicated to 100th anniversary of Pavlo Virsky.

In 1955, Virsky returned to Kyiv to helm the State Folk Dance Ensemble of the Ukrainian SSR he founded, which had been reconstituted by others after the conclusion of the war. For the next 20 years (until his death in 1975) Pavlo Virsky developed the concepts of Ukrainian folk-stage dance further than had previously been imagined. He founded a school to train dancers in the technique he developed. He toured the world with his dancers, influencing Ukrainian dancers the world over.

Virsky died on July 5, 1975, in Kyiv. The State Folk Dance Ensemble of the Ukrainian SSR was named after him in 1977.

== Legacy ==
=== Pryvit ===
Pryvit (Welcome, Ukrainian: Привiт) is a Ukrainian dance popularized or created by Virsky. In it, the dancers preview dances and the various representations or regional folk costumes which will be seen later in the performance. At some point in the dance, the audience is welcomed by one or more dancers bearing wheat, bread and (sometimes visible, but always implied) salt. It is performed by amateurs and professional Ukrainian dance ensembles as well as other performers of folk dance. The bread, salt and wheat represent the land's fertility to Ukrainian people.
