= Pavlo Virsky Ukrainian National Folk Dance Ensemble =

Ukrainian dance ensemble

Virsky Ukrainian National Folk Dance Ensemble Національний заслужений академічний ансамбль танцю України імені Павла Вірського
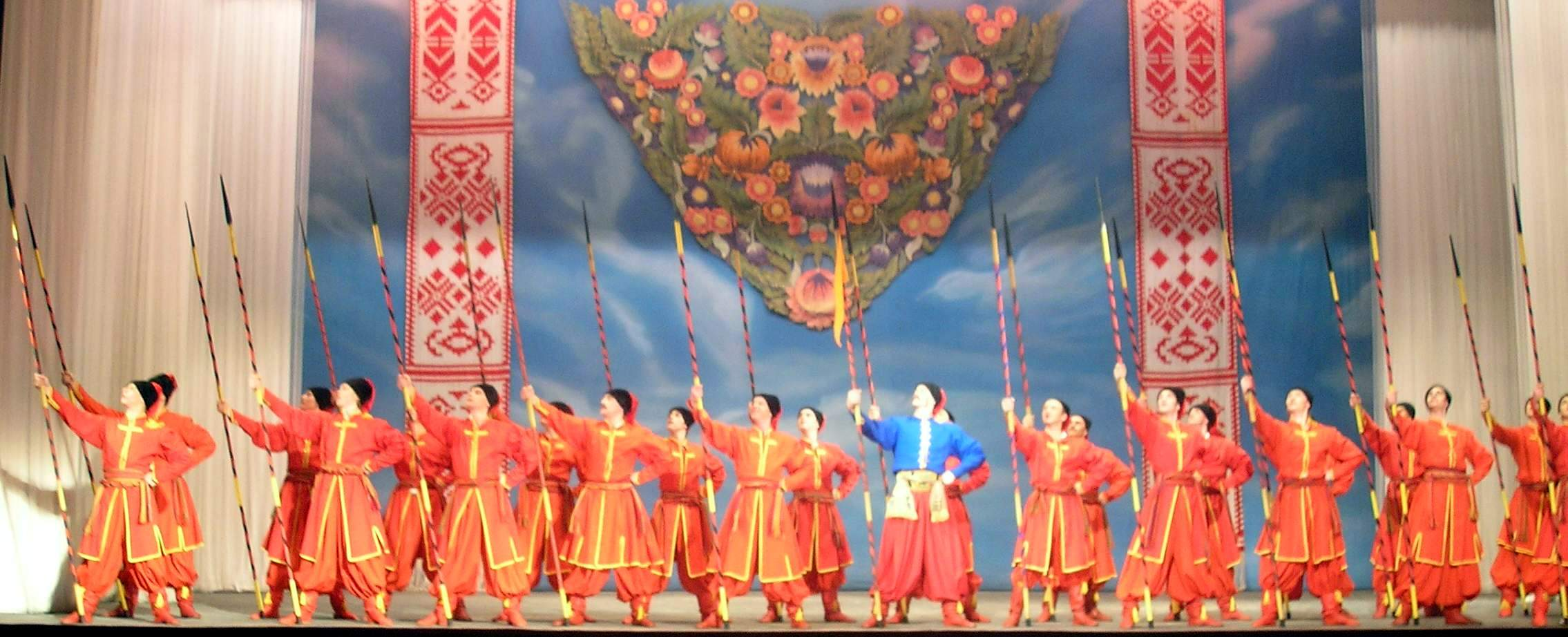
- Cossacks’ Dance (performance in Donetsk, 2006)

Background information
- Genres: folk tunes
- Years active: 1937 - present
- Members: Myroslav Vantukh
- Website: virsky.kyiv.ua

Virsky in performance

Pavlo Virsky Ukrainian National Folk Dance Ensemble (Ukrainian: Національний заслужений академічний ансамбль танцю України імені Павла Вірського; also referred to simply as Virsky) is a Ukrainian dance company based out of Ukraine, notable for its innovative approach to the art form. The ensemble was founded in 1937 by Pavlo Virsky and Mykola Bolotov, and guided by Virsky until his death in 1975. During World War II, Virsky performed for the soldiers at the front. Virsky's aim is to create dances that embrace historical Ukrainian dance traditions as well as dances that are innovative and forward-moving. In 1980, the company's artistic direction was overtaken by Myroslav Vantukh, who had been a disciple of Virsky.

== Repertoire ==
Virsky in performance

=== Choreography by Pavlo Virsky ===
- My Z Ukrainy (English: We are from Ukraine)
- Povzunets (English: Crawler), a Cossack comedy dance
- Oi, Pid Vishneiu (English: Oh, Under a Cherry Tree)
- Zaporozhtsi, National Ukrainian dance of Cossacks
- Vyshyvalnytsi (English: Embroideresses)
- Moriaky (English: Sailors)
- Hopak

=== Choreography by Myroslav Vantukh ===
- Carpathians
- Tambourine Dance
- The Years of Youth
- In Peace and Harmony
- Russian Suite
- Ukraino, moya Ukraino (English: Ukraine, My Ukraine)
- Tsygansky, a Roma dance
- The Volyn Patterns
- Kozachok

== See also ==
- List of folk dance performance groups
