= Arkan (dance) =

Type of dance

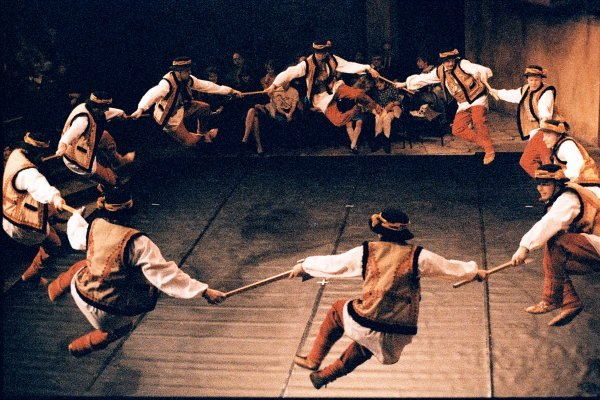
- Arkan dancers
- Native name: Аркан
- Etymology: Romanian: arcan, from Turkish: arkan, lit. 'rope', 'lasso'
- Genre: Folk dance
- Time signature: 2/4 alternating 1/4/ 2/8

Arkan (Ukrainian: Aркан, Aрґан) is a popular circle dance of the Ukrainian Hutsul people (from Hutsulshchyna, southwestern Ukraine). The word literally means lasso, borrowed from the Romanian language, derived from the Turkic word arkan, meaning 'rope', 'lasso'.

== Dance ==
The Arkan is traditionally performed around a burning bonfire by the men.

The word Arkan also refers to the step that the men perform while dancing around the fire. The step begins with the right foot stepping to the side (or double stamping as the dance builds momentum), the left foot crosses behind, the right footsteps to the side again, and the left foot is hopped in front of the dancer with a bent knee. The dance is performed with the men's arms upon one another's shoulders. In professional Ukrainian dances, however, many variations may accompany this root step. The rhythm of Arkan is 2/4.

== Ritual use ==
The Arkan is an element of the rite of passage of a 20-year-old Hutsul from a youth into a lehin ("young man"). After passing the rite, he was given the right to dance, carry a shepherd's axe, kill enemies and gird himself with a wide belt, i.e., he became a potential opryshok (Carpathian bands of 'noble highwaymen', similar to the Robin Hood archetype).

== Related dances and recordings ==
There is also a Romanian dance called Arcan.

Several artists have recorded versions of the tune traditionally associated with the Arkan, such as The Ukrainians, Ruslana, and Lemon Bucket Orkestra.

== See also ==
- Arcan (dance)
