= Beryozka =

Beryozka or Berezka (both transliterated from Cyrillic Берёзка) may refer to

- Beryozka (Russian retail store)
- Beryozka (Russian dance troupe)
- Beryozka (Russian dance)
- Beryozka, Kursk Oblast, a village in Russia
- Beryozka, Vladimir Oblast, a settlement in Russia

== See also ==
- Berezka, a village in Poland
- Beryozki, Volgograd Oblast
