= National symbols of Russia =

Modern Russia (i.e. the Russian Federation) has many symbols. Some of these symbols remain from historical periods such as the Tsarist era or Soviet Union, while others have even older origins.

The Russian Federation has several official national symbols including a flag, an emblem, a national anthem. The current design of the national flag is the same as the Russian Empire and was officially adopted again after the dissolution of the Soviet Union.

== Emblems and symbols ==
Symbol	Name	Image
National flag	Flag of Russia	
National emblem	Coat of arms of Russia	
National anthem	National anthem of Russia	
De facto National personification	Mother Russia	
National founder	Rurik	
National animal	Eurasian brown bear (Ursus arctos arctos)	
De facto National bird	Golden eagle (Aquila chrysaetos)	
National currency	Russian ruble	
National dances	Barynya, Kamarinskaya, Kozachok, Tropak, Khorovod	
National flower	Chamomile (Matricaria chamomilla)	
National instruments	Garmon, balalaika, gusli, spoons	
National poet	Alexander Pushkin, Anna Akhmatova, Boris Pasternak, Sergei Yesenin, Ivan Turgenev, Ivan Bunin	
Patron saint	Our Lady Derzhavnaya, Alexander Nevsky, Andrew, Basil the Great, Casimir, George, Joseph, Vladimir I of Kiev, Boris and Gleb, Sergius of Radonezh	
National tree	Birch (Betula pendula)	framless
National colors	White #FFFFFF Blue #0036A7 Red #D62718 Green #63B76C	
National liquor	Vodka	
De facto National fruit	Apple (Malus domestica)	
National sport	Bandy	
National dish	Beef stroganoff, chicken Kiev, pierogi, borscht, shchi, Kasha, pelmeni, pirozhki	

=== Soviet era ===
- State Anthem of the Soviet Union
- Flag of RSFSR
- Victory Banner
- Hammer and sickle
- Red star
