= Prisiadki =

East Slavic folk dance move

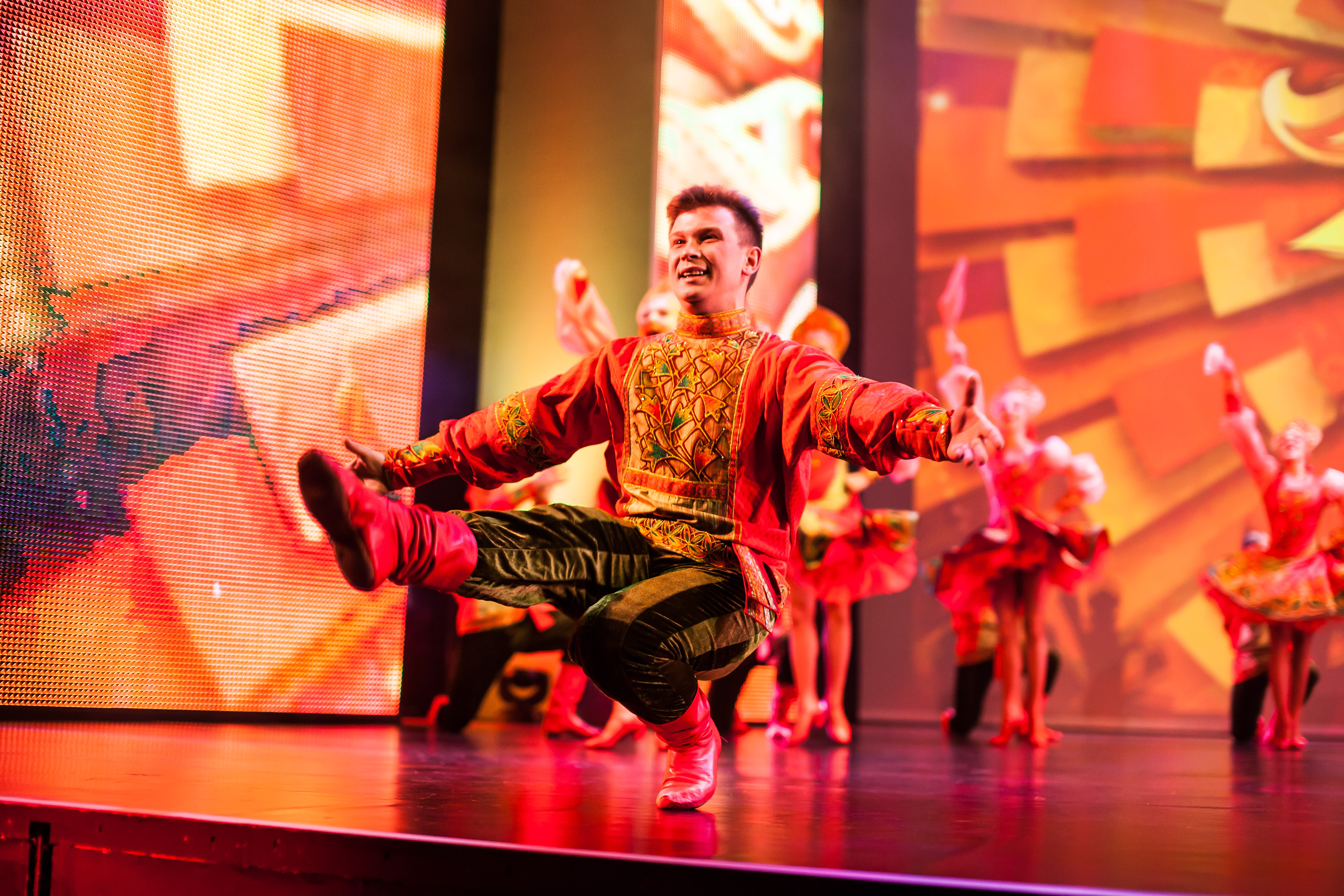
Russian dancer at the Imagine Cup

Prisiadki (singular: Russian: присядка, romanized: prisiadka, plural присядки; Ukrainian: присідання, romanized: prysidannia, or присядки, prysiadky) or vprisiadku dancing (Russian: вприсядку) is a type of male dance move in East Slavic (Russian, Ukrainian) dances. The dancer squats and thrusts one foot out in turns. The term is occasionally translated in English as squatting (squat dance, e.g., in a translation of Eugene Onegin).

== Description ==
Two basic techniques are possible. In one way, "full prisiadki", the dancer crouches on one leg while another one is thrust out straight and repeats the same alternating the crouching leg while staying in the crouching position. In another way, "half-prisiadki" (полуприсядки), the dancer quickly crouches and then jumps up making a low thrust with one leg sideways or on the heel.

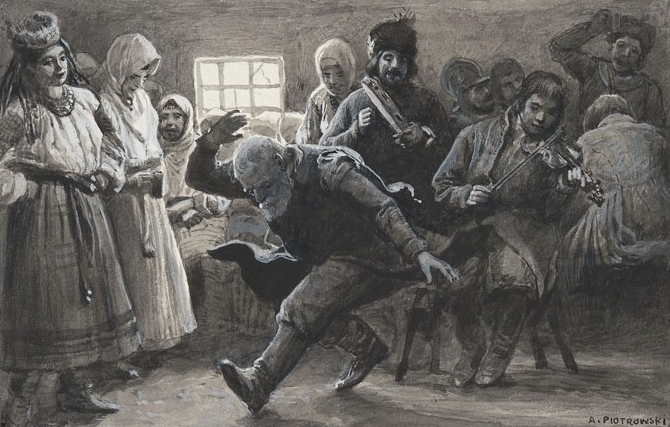
Onufry Zagłoba dancing w prysiudach, an illustration to With Fire and Sword (1885) by Henryk Sienkiewicz

It is a distinct element of a number of East Slavic dances, such as Ukrainian Kozachok and Hopak or Russian Barynya and Kamarinskaya. It also entered Polish culture. For example, the novel With Fire and Sword by Henryk Sienkiewicz in several places describes how people were dancing w prysiudach, including the jovial character Onufry Zagłoba.

Early evidence of vprisiadku dancing comes from a mid-fourtheenth century Psalter, in which an initial of letter A depicts a skomorokh playing gusli and dancing vprisiadku.

In improvisational folk dances prisiadki involved fancy footwork: in addition to thrusting a free leg it can be thrown up onto the hip of the support leg, rolling from the toe of the support leg onto the knee and back, doing splits, etc.

Laura J. Olson remarks that numerous professional Cossack troupes and choirs created in the Soviet Union produced a stereotype of Cossacks as "swashbuckling sword twirlers and lithe, masculine dancers who could leap extremely high or perform innumerable prisiadki". She further remarks that these fancy performances did not directly originate from Cossack traditions but that they were transformed and codified by 19th century Russian ballet.

== Squat-dancing in other cultures ==
Dance scenes on ancient Mesopotamian/Babylonian artifacts lead researchers to suggest that these ancient people executed something like prisiadka, and some even suggested that "this kind of dance became the basis for the development of a certain style of Cossack dance".

== Gallery ==
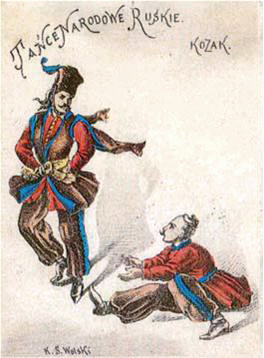
Rusyn folk dance "Kozak"

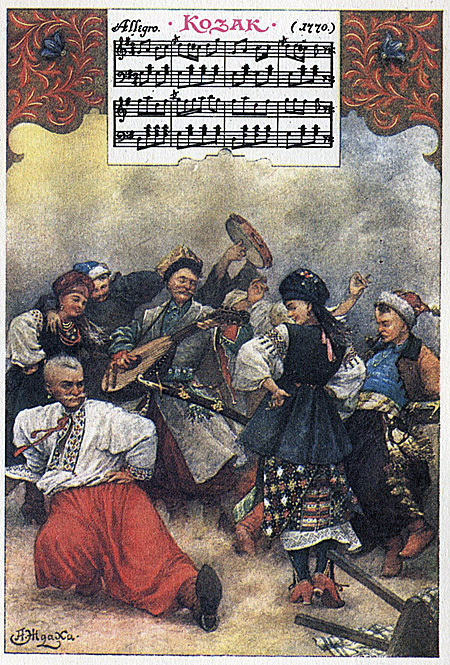
Kozak

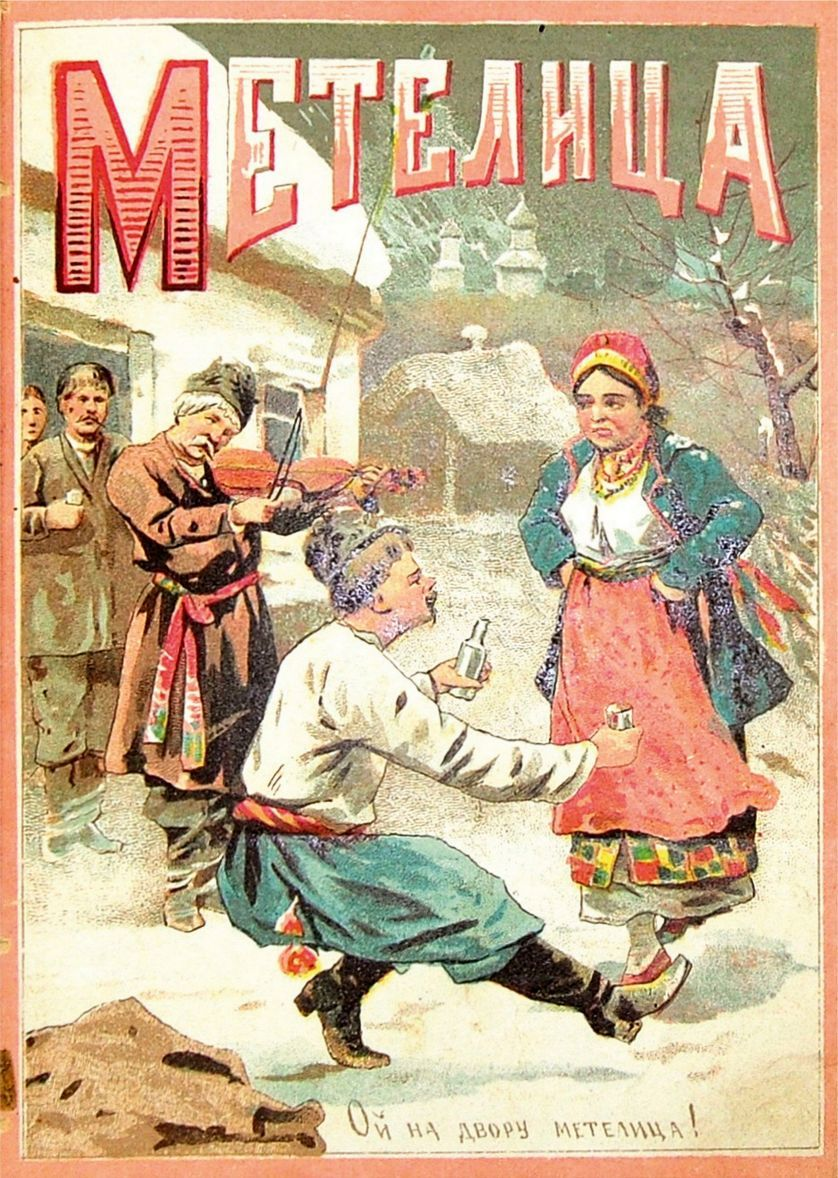
Metelitsa

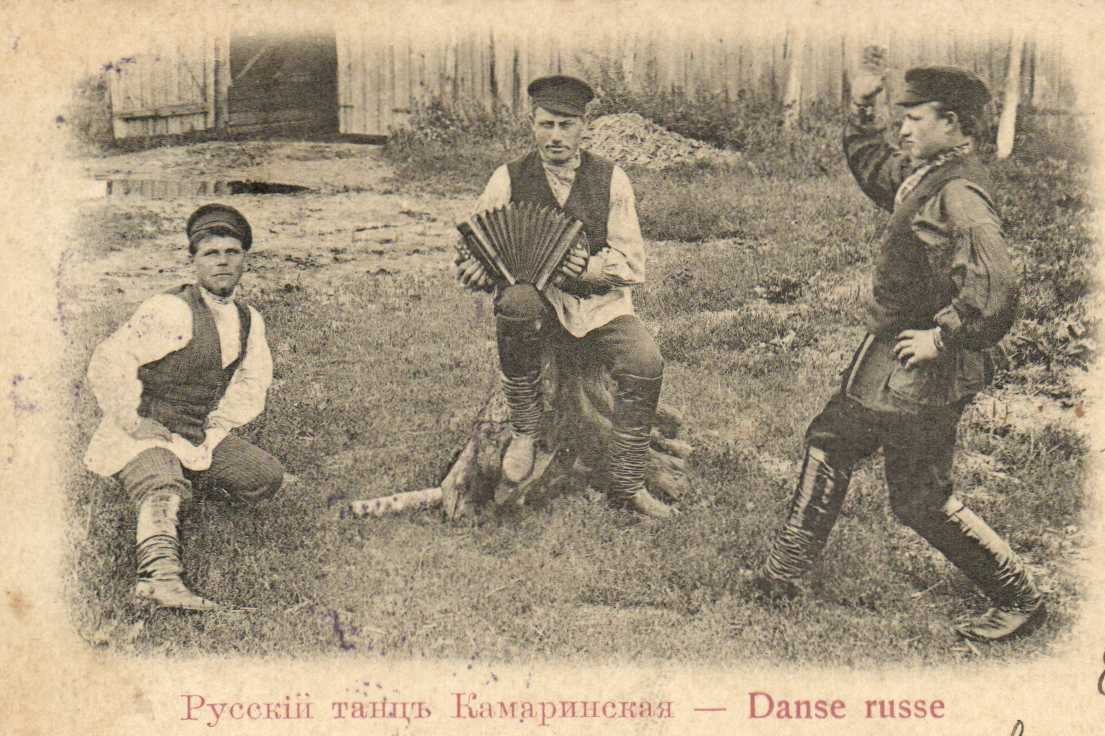
Kamarinskaya

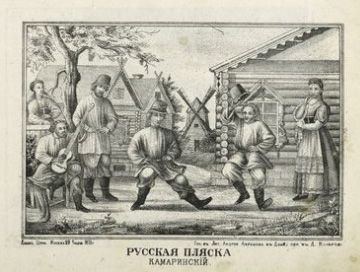
Kamarinsky

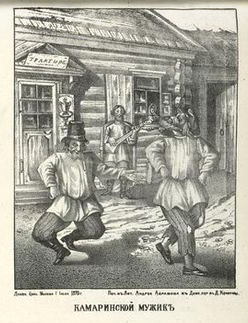
Kamarinsky muzhik. Lubok

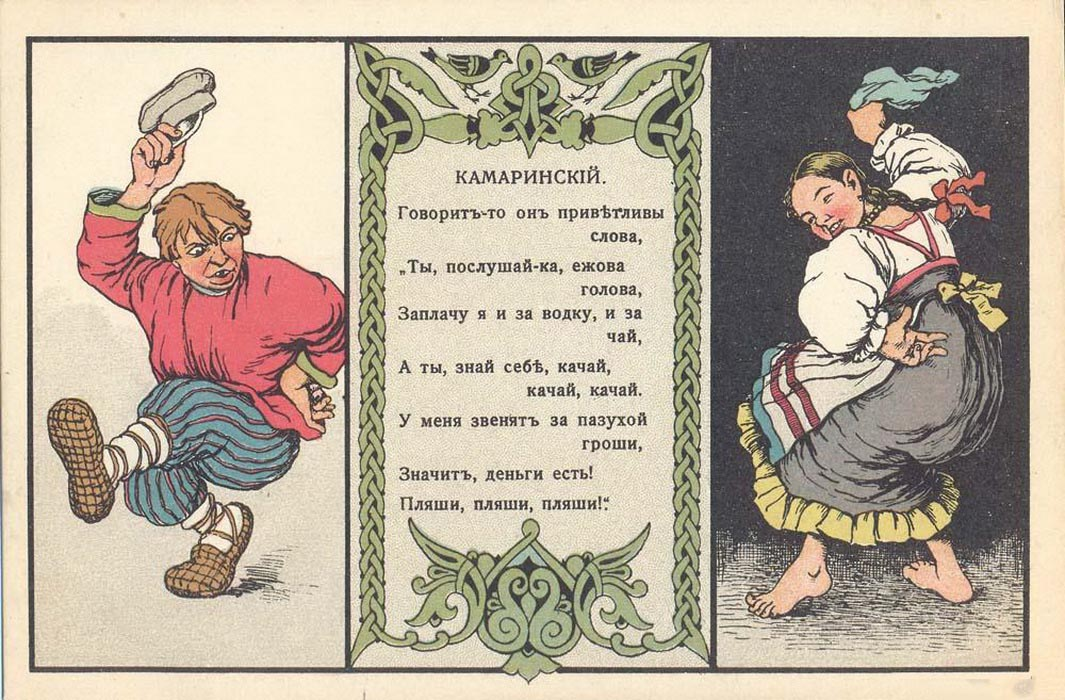
Kamarinsky dance and chastushka

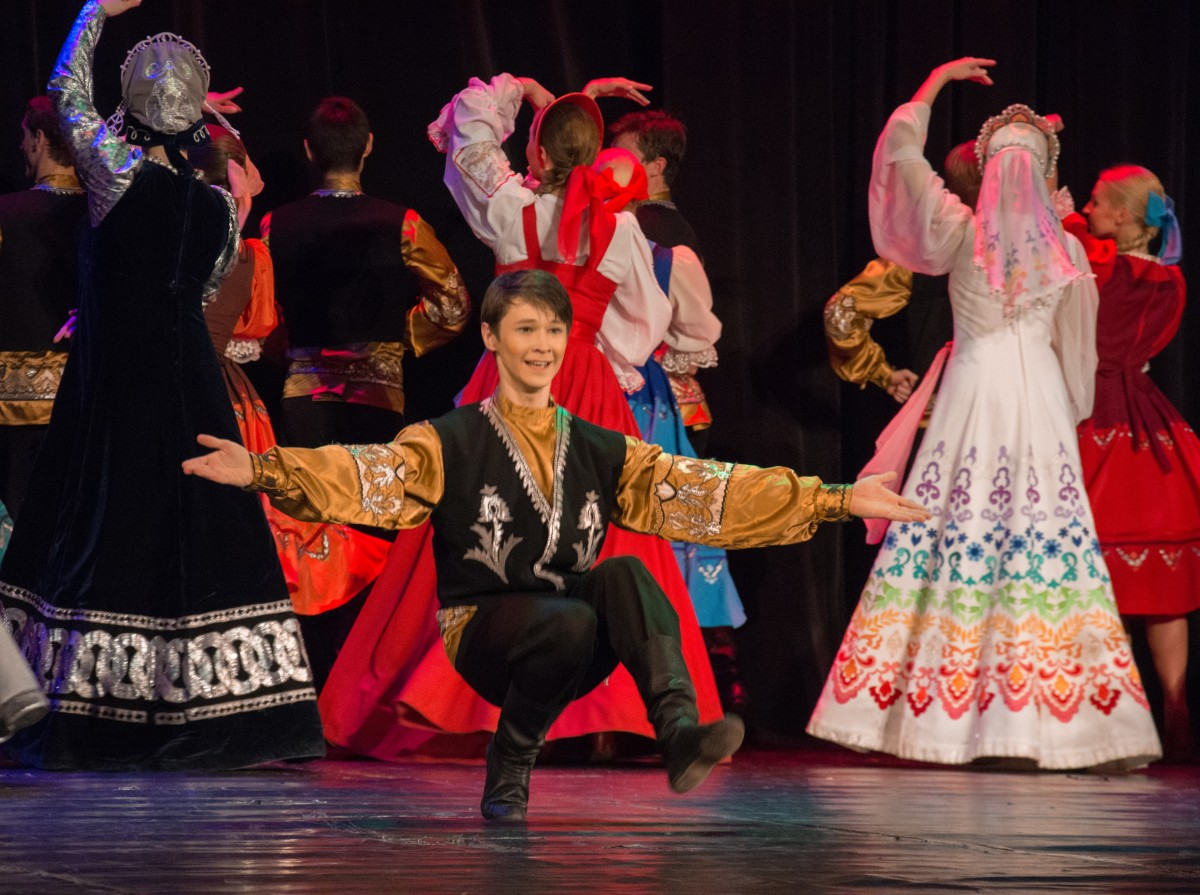
Folk troupe Beryozka

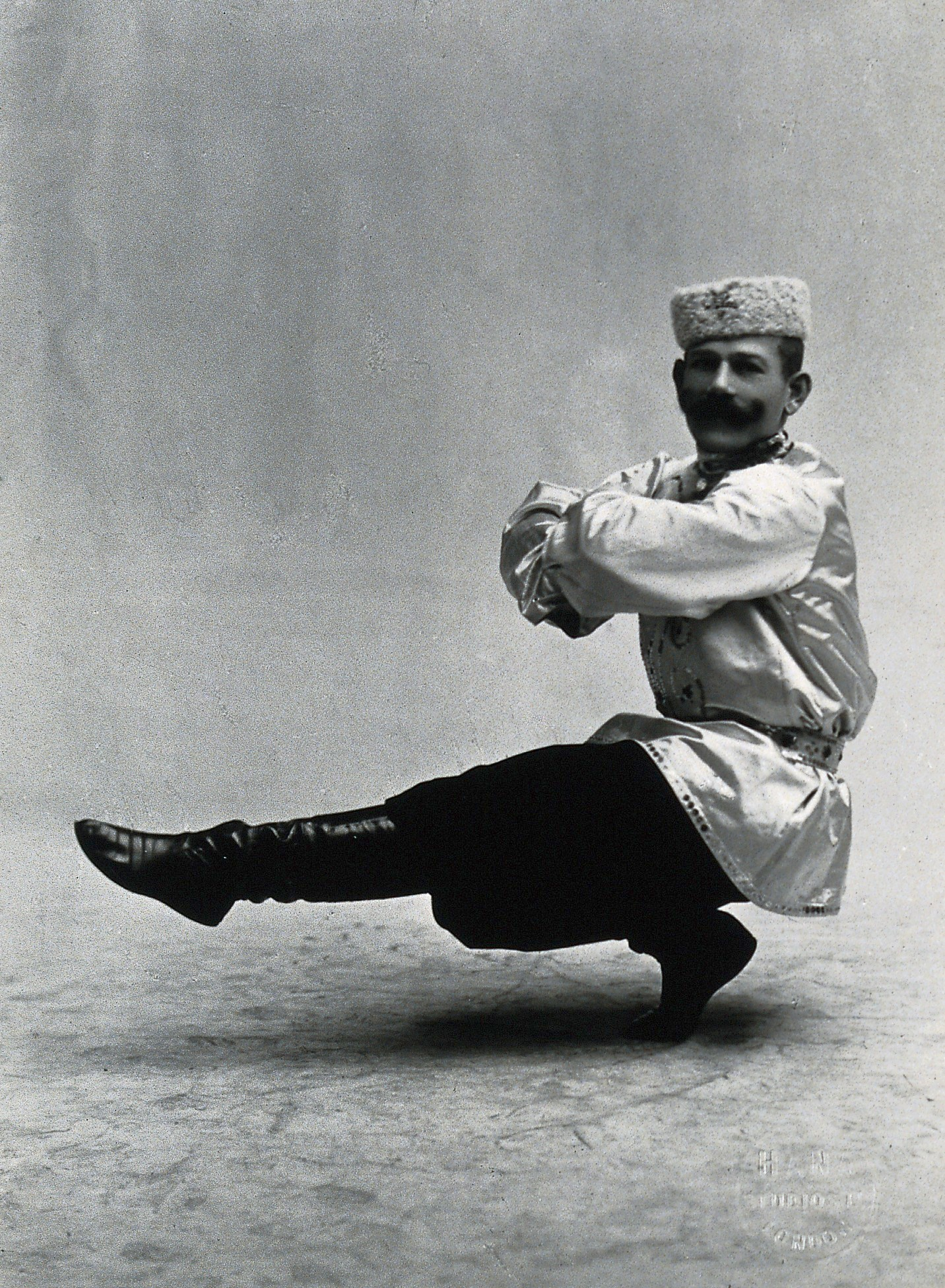
Man demonstrating a prisiadka

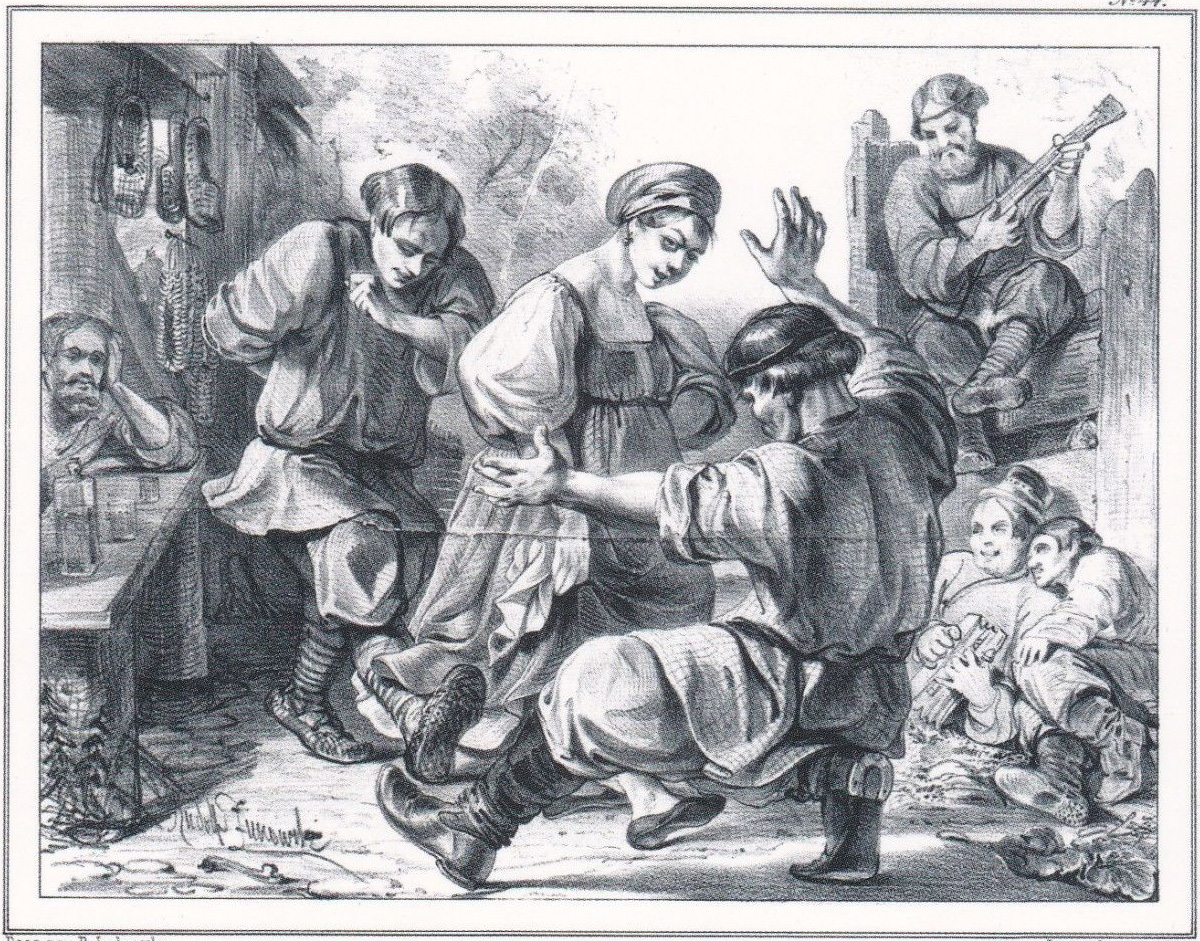
Trepak

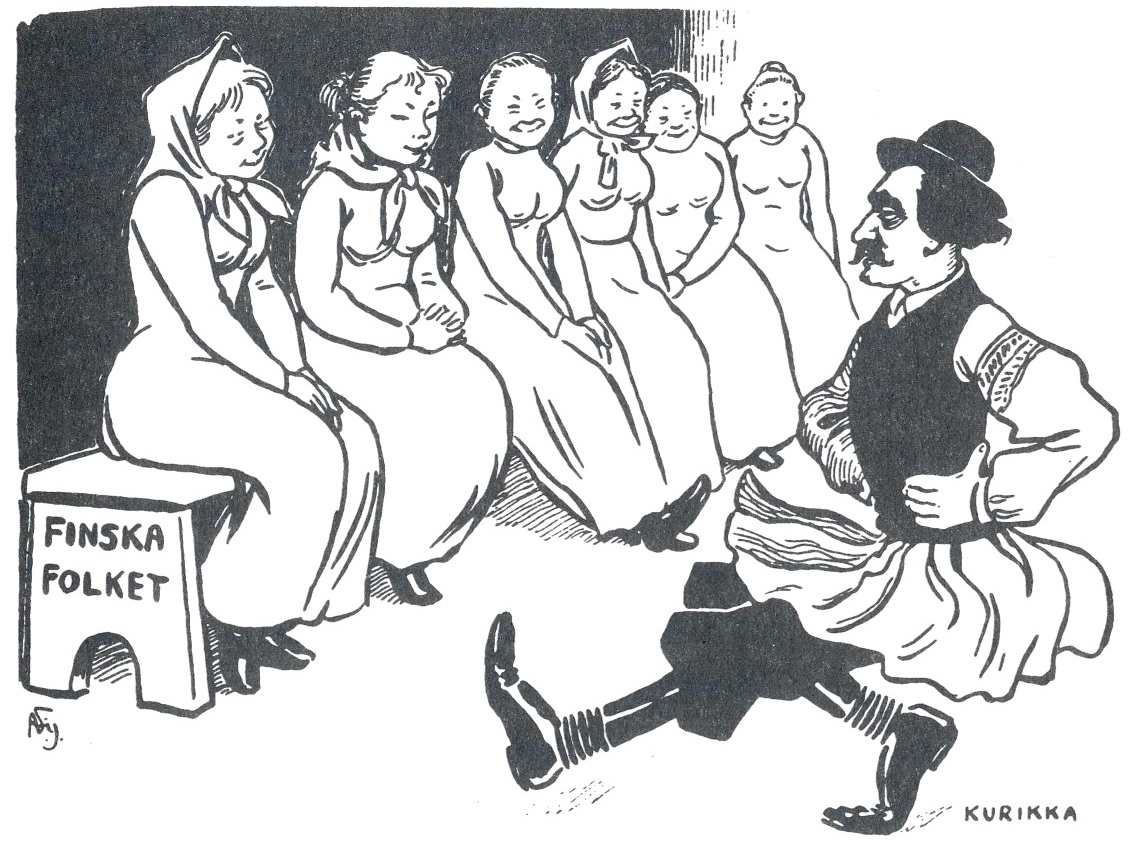
Matti Kurikka dancing Ripaska (Trepak)

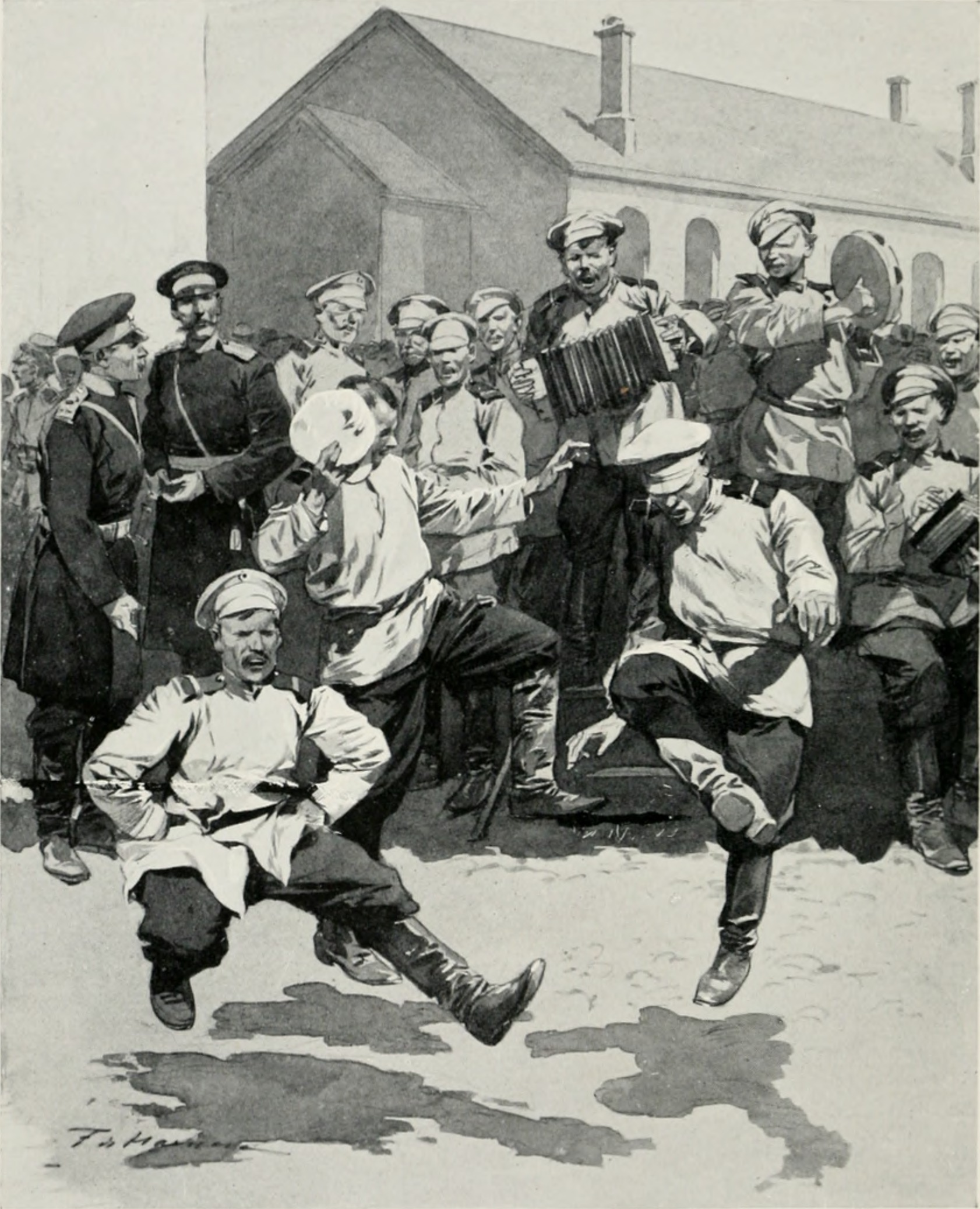
Soldiers dancing in barracks

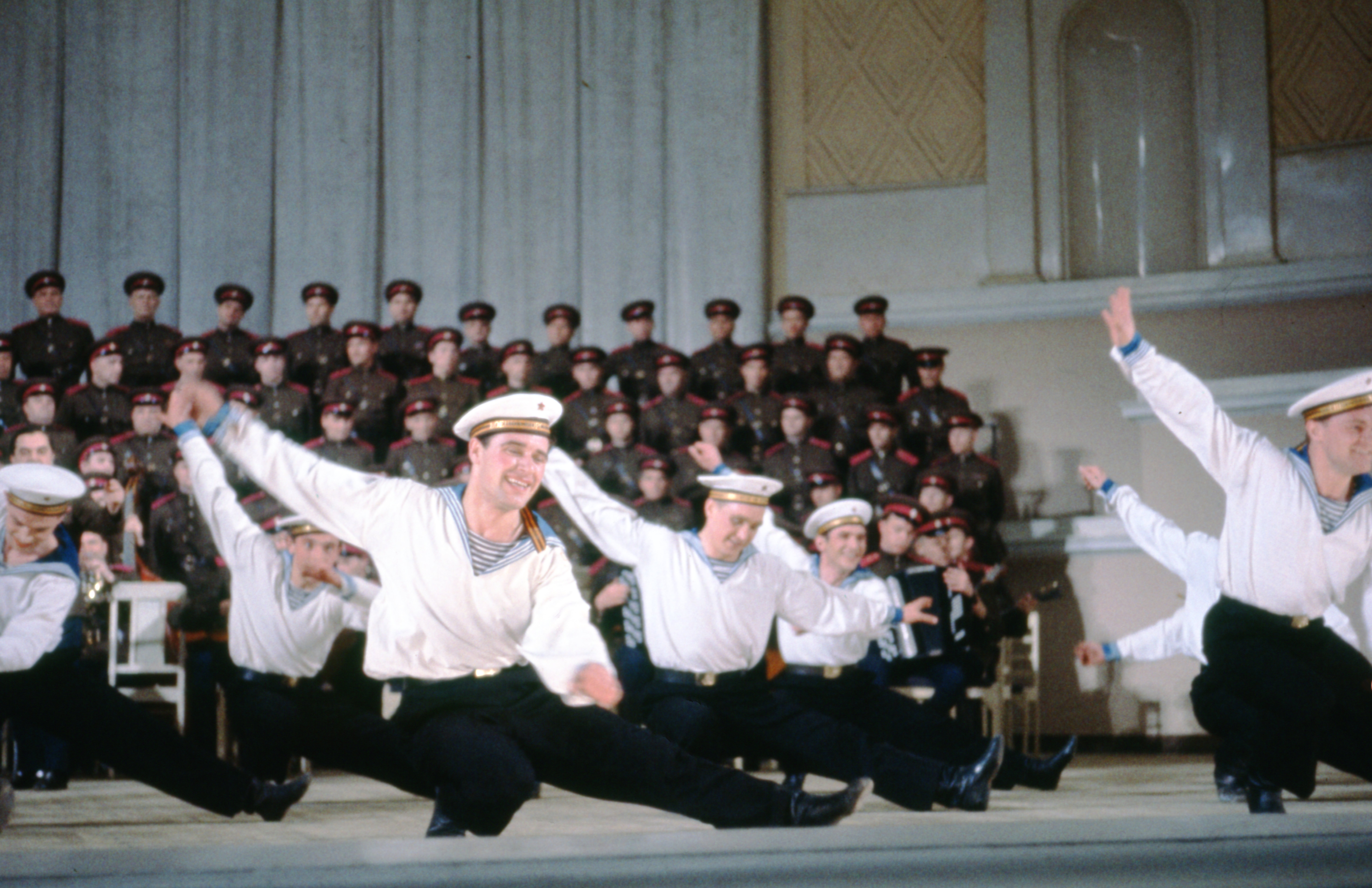
Yablochko

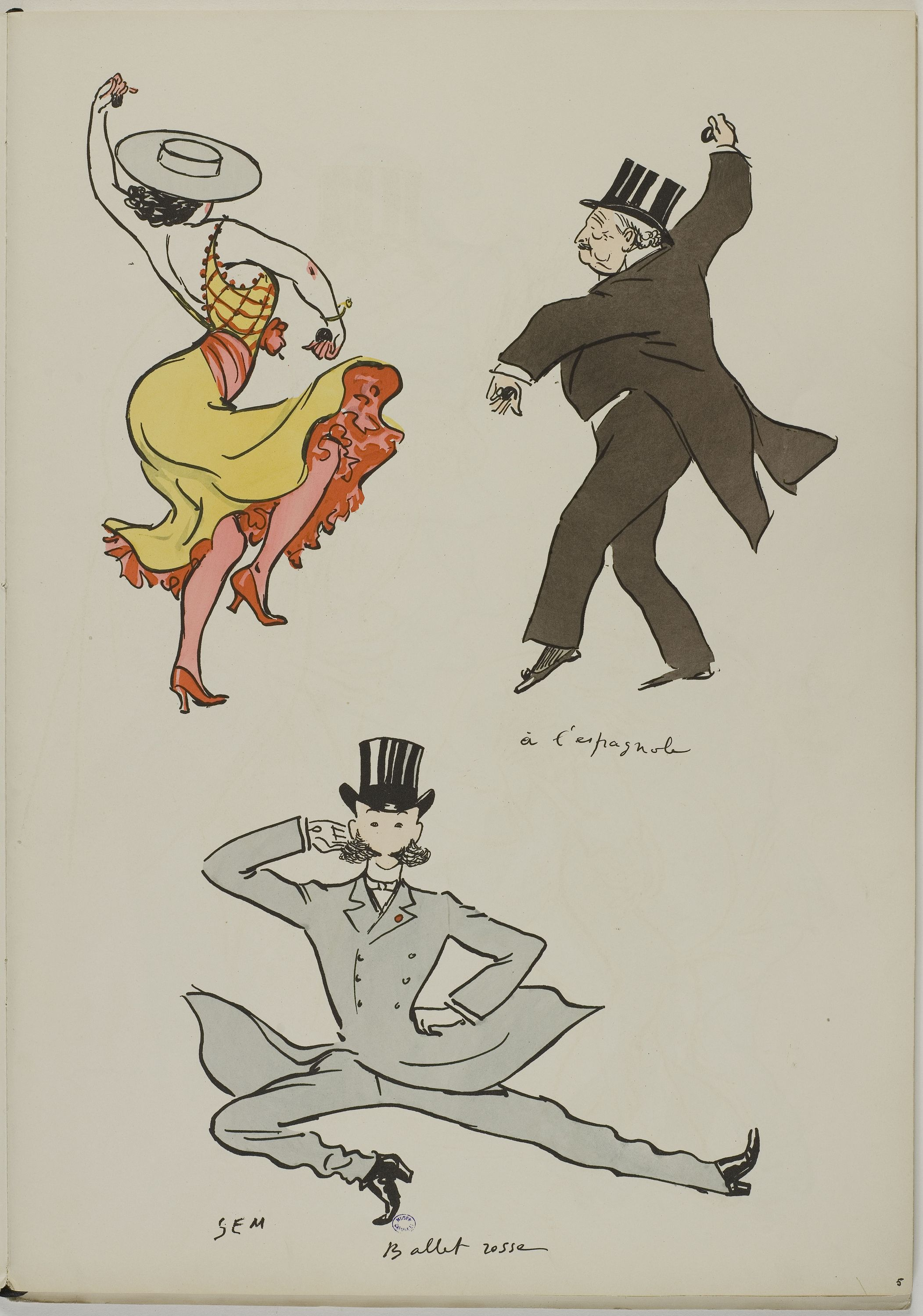
"Spanish dance" and "Russian dance"

== Cultural references ==
The ability to dance prisiadki on prosthetic legs in a Barynya dance for a military pilot was the climax of the patriotic novel The Story of a Real Man by Boris Polevoy.

The controversial Dancing Cossacks advertisement for the New Zealand National Party criticized the compulsory superannuation scheme Labour Government. In the television advertisement a group of cartoon Cossacks move vprisiadku across the screen suggesting that this policy could lead to Soviet-type communism.

In Street Fighter II fighting game, Gorbachev rounds up Zangief and a bunch of KGB agents, and together with them he does the "Russian squat dance", for a celebration.

The 1936 Polish film Bohaterowie Sybiru has an episode where Polish insurgents exiled to Siberia are partying with Siberian peasants. A young Russian lad does a fancy squatwork, after that a Polish officer says "I can do the same", and he does. After that the camera zooms out and shows that he does this sitting on a low stool.
