= Trepak (disambiguation) =

Trepak is an East Slavic folk dance

Trepak may also refer to:

- Trepak (The Nutcracker), dance movement from ballet The Nutcracker by Tchaikovsky
- "Trepak", a piece from the Songs and Dances of Death by Russian composer Modest Mussorgsky

== Surname ==
- Oleksandr Trepak, Ukrainian major general
- Viktor Trepak, Ukrainian law enforcement officer
- Zoltán Trepák, Hungarian basketball player
