= Troika (dance) =

Russian folk dance

Troika is a Russian performance dance based on Russian folk dances. The Russian word troika means three-horse team/gear, and the dancers imitate the prancing of horses pulling a sled or a carriage.

The first version was created by choreographer Nadezhda Nadezhdina for her folklore dance troupe Beroyzka in 1948. Since then this dance is included into repertoires of virtually all Russian ethnographic dance ensembles. Initially, it was a dance for a man and two women, but later choreographies with other combinations were created, such as one woman and two men or three women.

== Other cultures ==
Similar folk dances are known among other Slavic peoples, e.g., the Polish Trojak.

A Cajun dance of the same name, Troika, exists, similar to the Russian dance. It has been suggested that the Cajun version of the dance originated at the times when Cossacks of the Russian tsar army were stationed in Paris.

There was a German contra dance triolet recorded in 1829 for groups of one man and two women.

== See also ==
- List of ethnic, regional, and folk dances by origin
- Outline of dance
