= Zapovedny, Kursk Oblast =

Rural locality in Kursk Oblast, Russia

Zapovedny Заповедный
- Settlement
- Interactive map of Zapovedny
- Location of Zapovedny Zapovedny (Kursk Oblast)
- Coordinates: 51°34′12″N 36°05′07″E
- Country: Russia
- Federal subject: Kursk Oblast
- Administrative district: Kursky District
- SelsovietSelsoviet: Novoposelenovsky

Population (2010 Census)
  - Total: 98
  - Estimate (2010): 98 (0%)

Municipal status
  - Municipal district: Kursky Municipal District
  - Rural settlement: Novoposelenovsky Selsoviet Rural Settlement
- Time zone: UTC+3 (MSK)
- Postal code: 305528
- Dialing code: +7 4712
- OKTMO ID: 38620452121
- Website: novoposel.rkursk.ru

Zapovedny (Russian: Заповедный) is a rural locality (a settlement) in Novoposelenovsky Selsoviet Rural Settlement, Kursky District, Kursk Oblast, Russia. Population: 98 (2010 census); 107 (2002 census);

== Geography ==
The settlement is located 75 km from the Russia–Ukraine border, 18 km south-west of Kursk, 7 km from the selsoviet center – 1st Tsvetovo.

Climate

Zapovedny has a warm-summer humid continental climate (Dfb in the Köppen climate classification).

== Transport ==
Zapovedny is located 0.5 km from the federal route M-2 Crimea Highway (a part of the European route E105), on the road of intermunicipal significance 38H-180 ("Crimea Highway" – Beryozka), 9 km from the nearest railway halt 457 km (railway line Lgov I — Kursk).

The rural locality is situated 25 km from Kursk Vostochny Airport, 107 km from Belgorod International Airport and 219 km from Voronezh Peter the Great Airport.
