= Russian folk dance =

Folklore dance of the Russian people

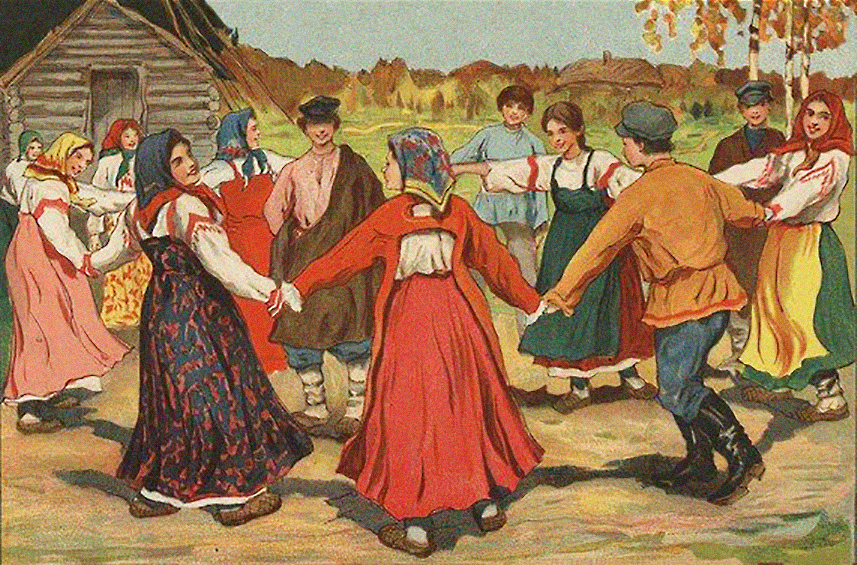
Traditional village folk dance Khorovod, 1900s.

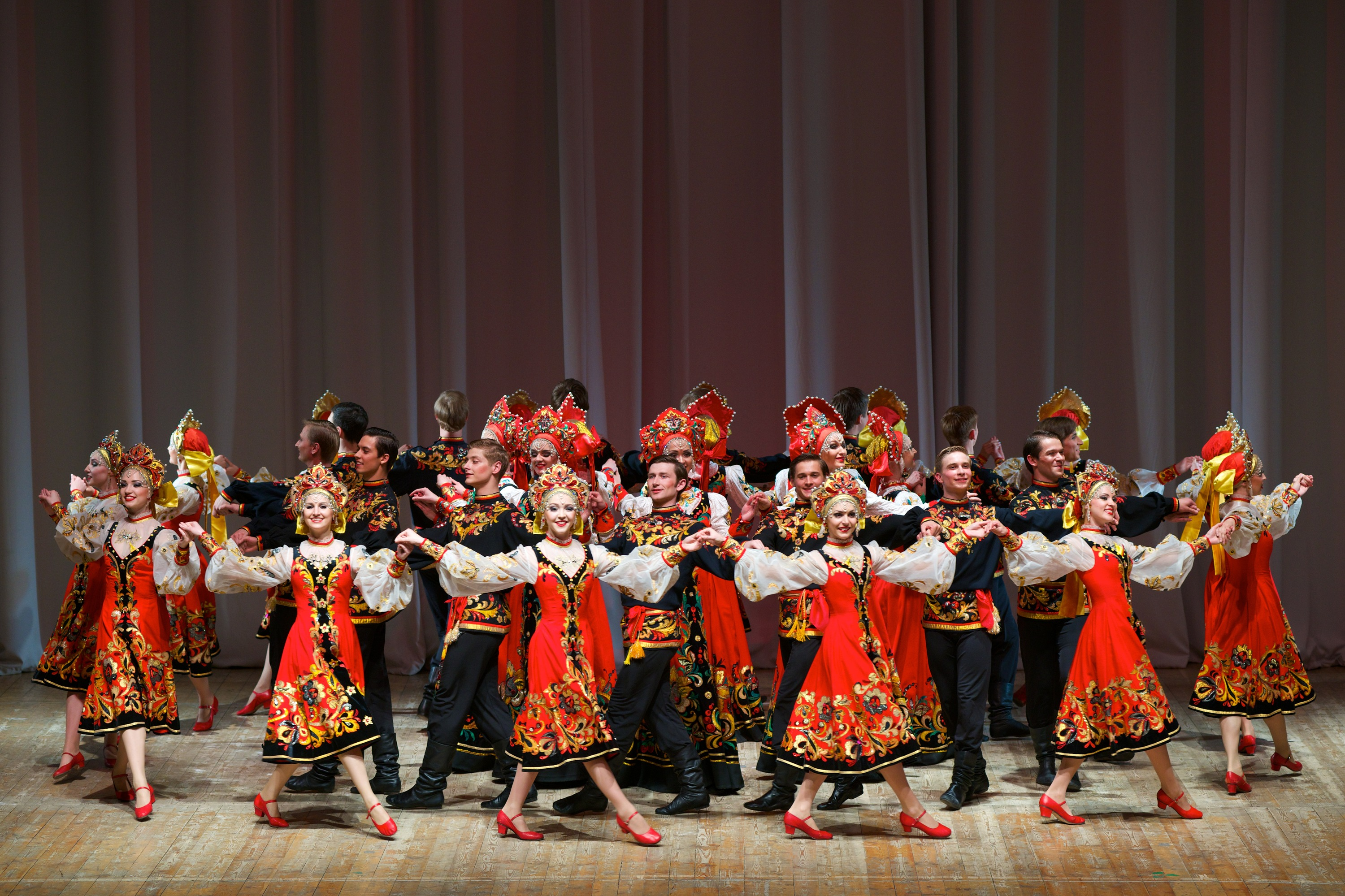
Russian folk dance concert performed by the dance ensemble Gzhel

Russian folk dance (Russian: Русский народный танец) is an important part of Russian culture. Some of the unique characteristics suggest that many elements were developed by the early Russian population.

== History ==
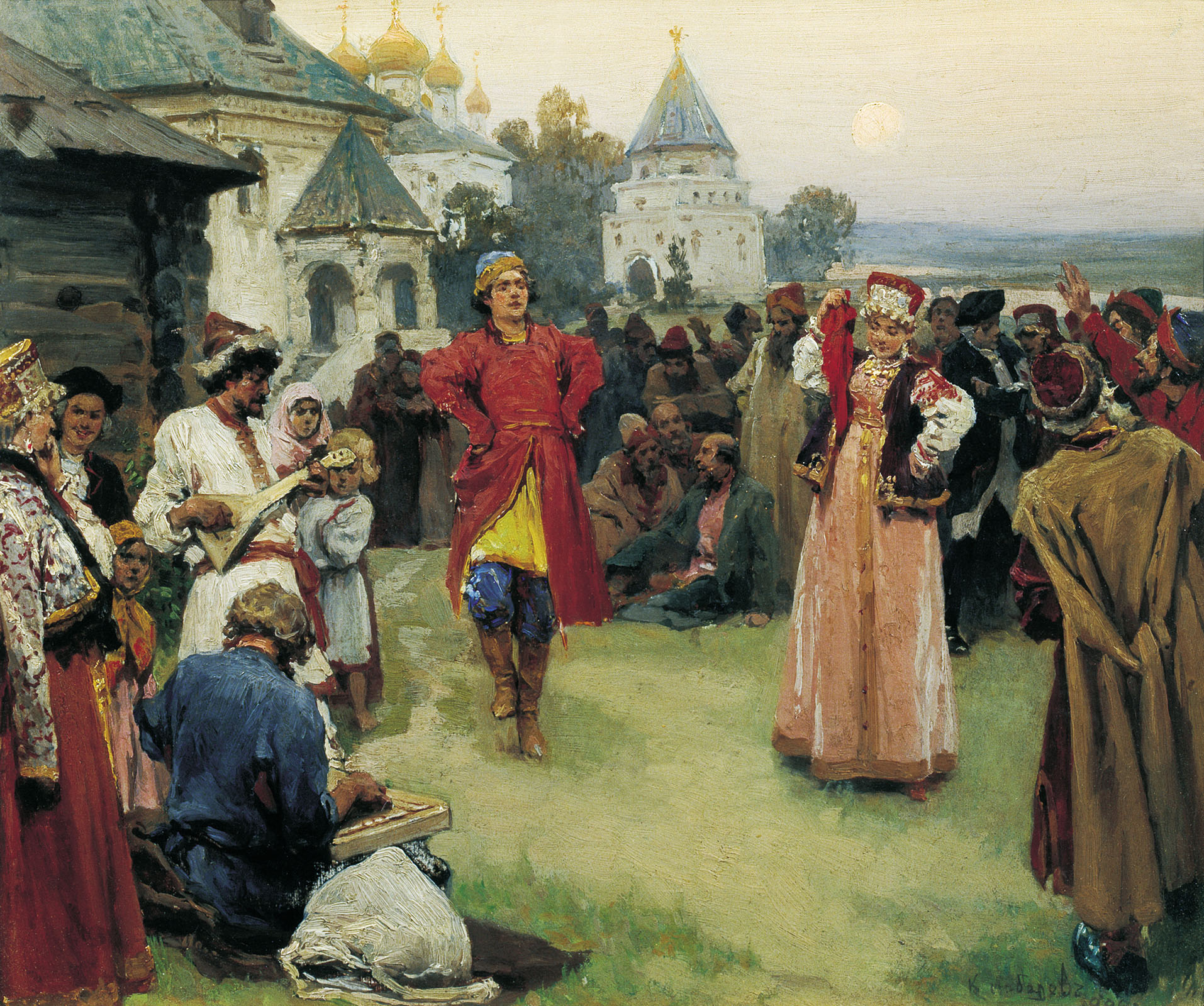
Russian plyaska with golden Onion domes in background

Many Russian dances became known from the 10th century. Russia witnessed various invasions from other countries. Due to its location and size the country also came into contact with many different cultures through migration and trading. In turn, a Eurasian cultural mix of music and dance helped develop Russian folk dances.

Many of these early dances were performed and practiced by the lower classes. Typically the upper classes would watch performers rather than participate in the dances themselves.

The original Russian folk dance traditions continue to play an important part in the culture of the country and have been in constant interaction with Russia’s many ethnic groups. Russian folk dances are also in interrelations with other types of artistic expressions. One example can be seen in the Ballets Russes, which invokes Russian folk dances and music in its pieces.

== Costumes ==
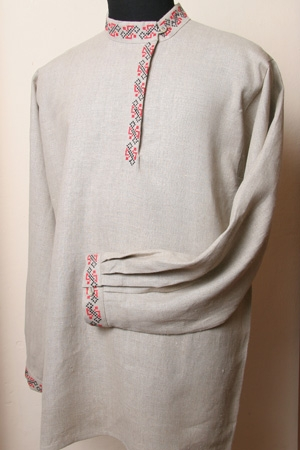
The Kosovorotka is traditional Russian shirt patterned with the East Slavic Vyshyvanka. The colors red and white are often a dominant part of Russian folk clothing.

Costumes for concert dance are beautifully designed with great detail. Typically, the clothing for the dances is based on specific events, such as holidays, and varies between these events. Women wear holiday headdresses, embroidered shirts, belts, and ornamented aprons. Men wear shirts, a belt, narrow trousers, and high red boots. The color red is incorporated into many of the costumes because it is associated with beauty in Russian tradition. In Russian dances, women and girls often carry a pocket square with them. Girls and women often wear the traditional Russian headdress kokoshnik during performances.

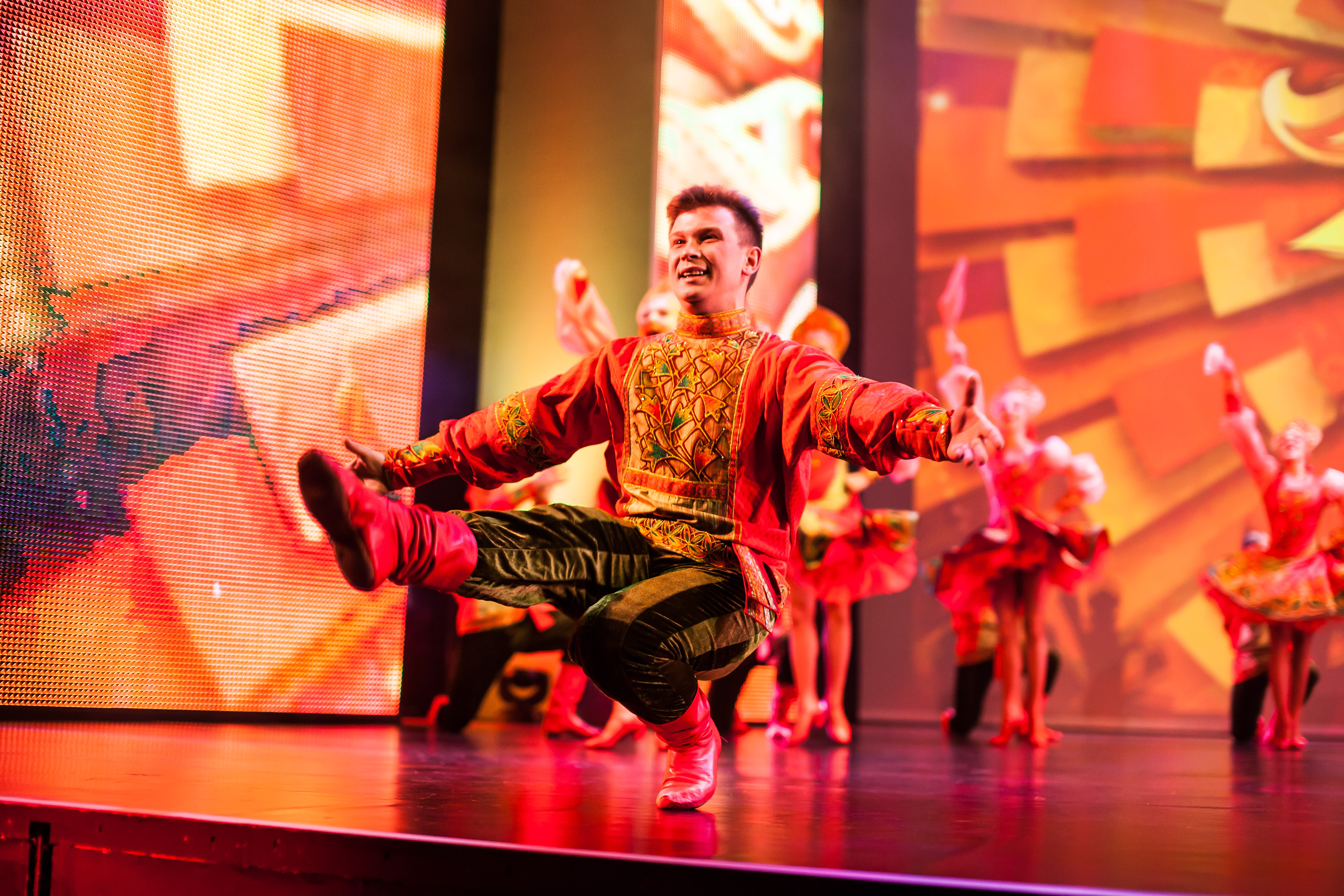
Traditional Russian squat dancing

== Characteristics ==
Both furious and gentle music is the basis for Russian dances.

Probably the most famous characteristics of Russian male dances are the Russian squat work (knee bending elements), stomping, some acrobatic tricks and the split jumps (also Russian split or Russian jump). Split jumps exist in similar forms in Chinese dance. Dance features of this kind usually use expeditious music which changes its tempo over time. Russian squat work and knee bending movements are usually carried out by the male dancers. In Russian dance it is also common for male dancers to stomp, clap and strike the sole, front of the foot, thighs, knees and the chest with their hands held flat, similar to the German Schuhplattler, but in a much faster tempo.

The Russian circle dance Horovod has its roots in ancient Slavic traditions and exists in similar forms in Balkans (Choros in Greece), in Middle Eastern cultures and in China.

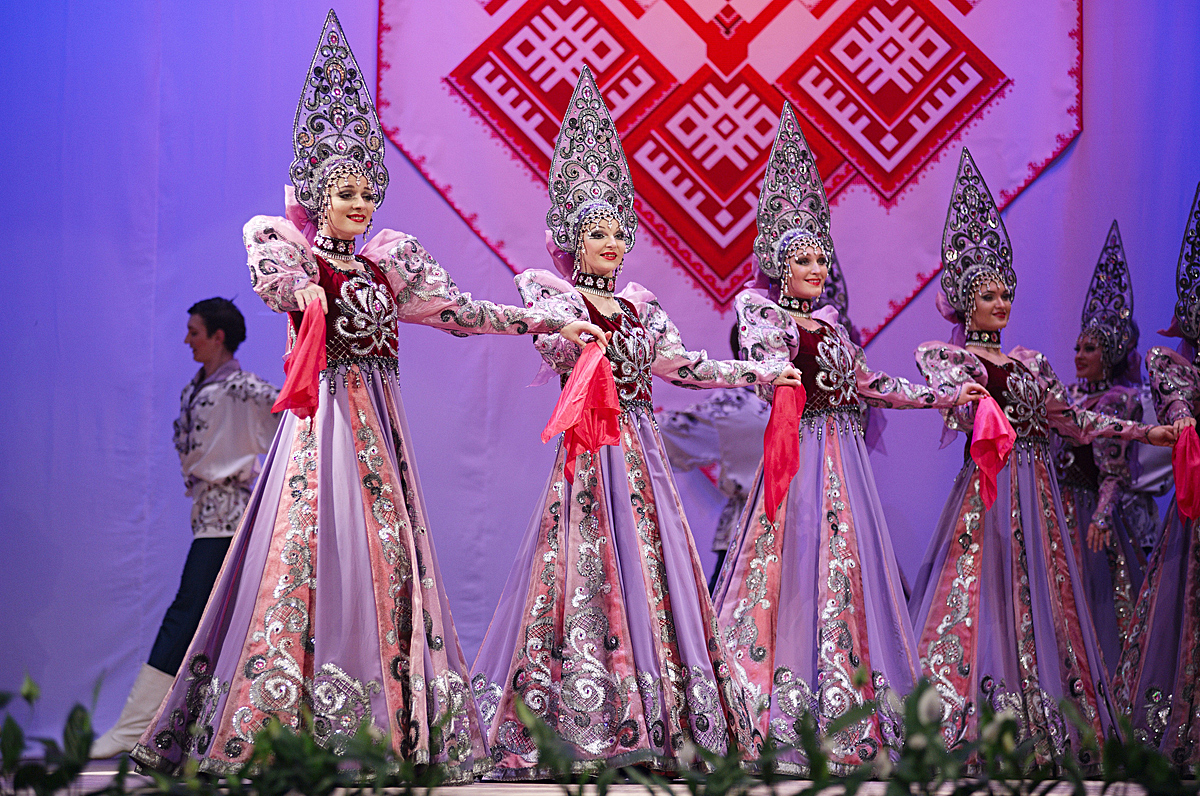
One of the largest shows featuring Russian stage folk dances is Gzhel in Moscow

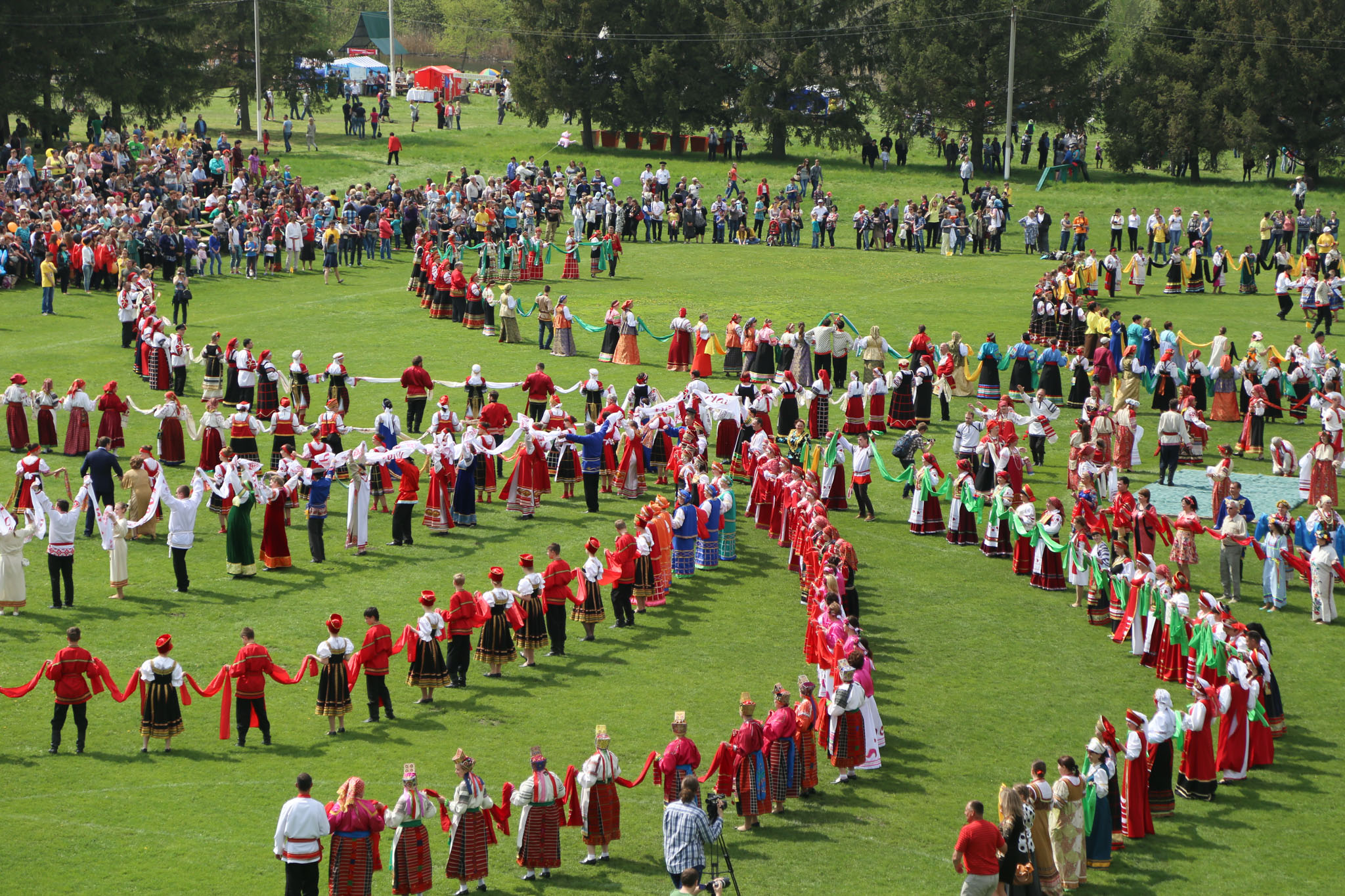
Folk festival in Belgorod region in May 2015.

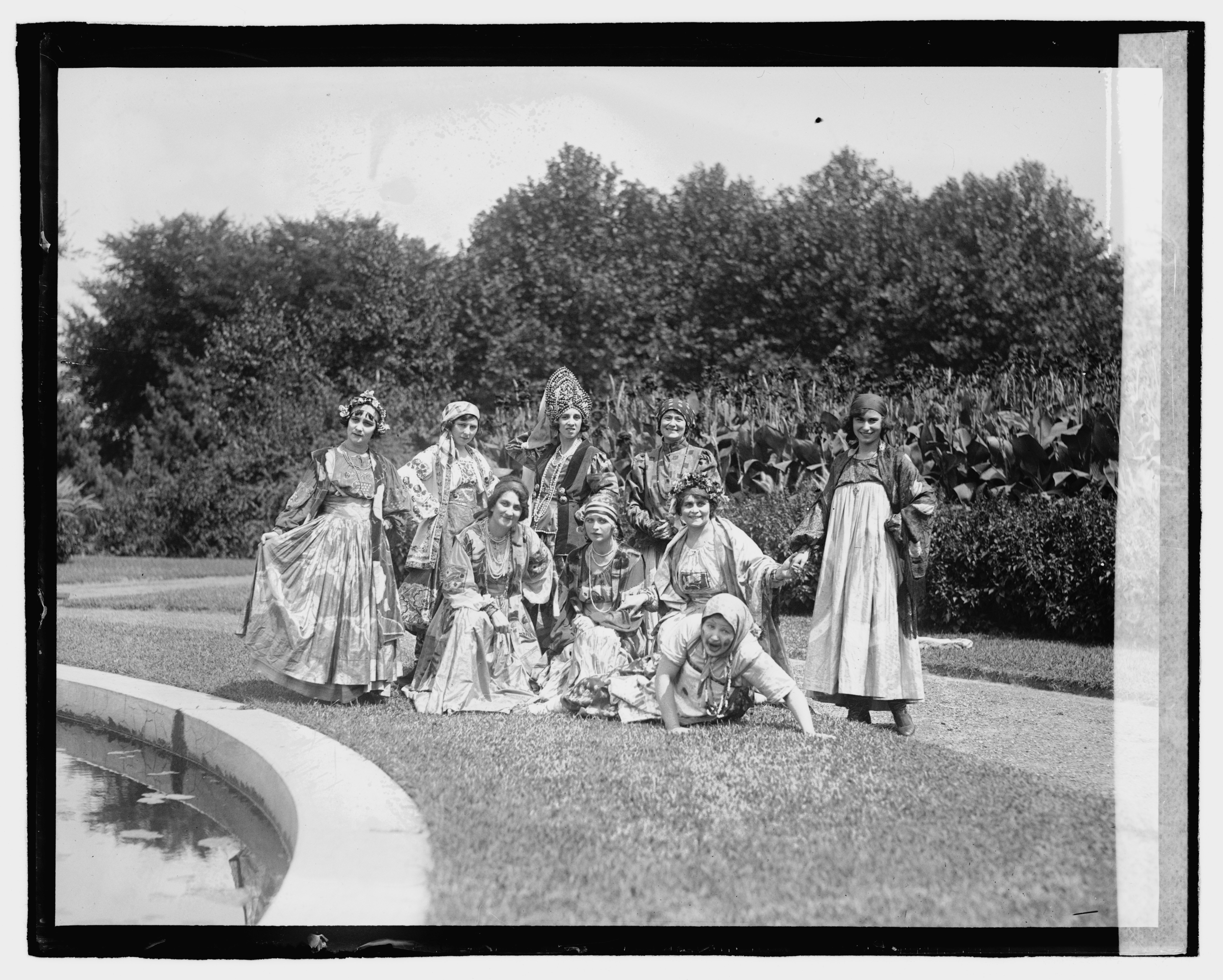
Russian dancers, 1922

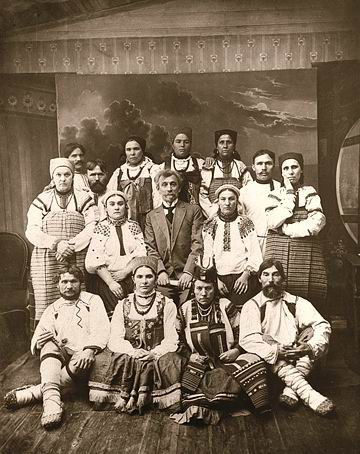
Pyatnitsky Choir in 1900 - 1910 (Watch style and different elements of Russian folk dance and music from the Pyatnitsky Choir, performed by males and females on YouTube)

== Russian dances ==
- Barynya
- Beryozka
- Kamarinskaya
- Khorovod
- Prisiadki
- Troika
- Tropak
- Tsyganochka
- Yablochko

== See also ==
- List of ethnic, regional, and folk dances by origin
- Russian traditional music
