= Alexandra Brushtein =

Russian and Soviet writer, playwright and memoirist

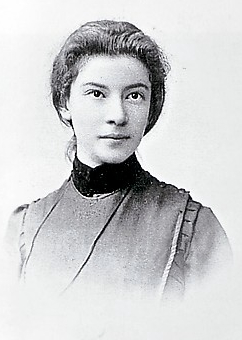

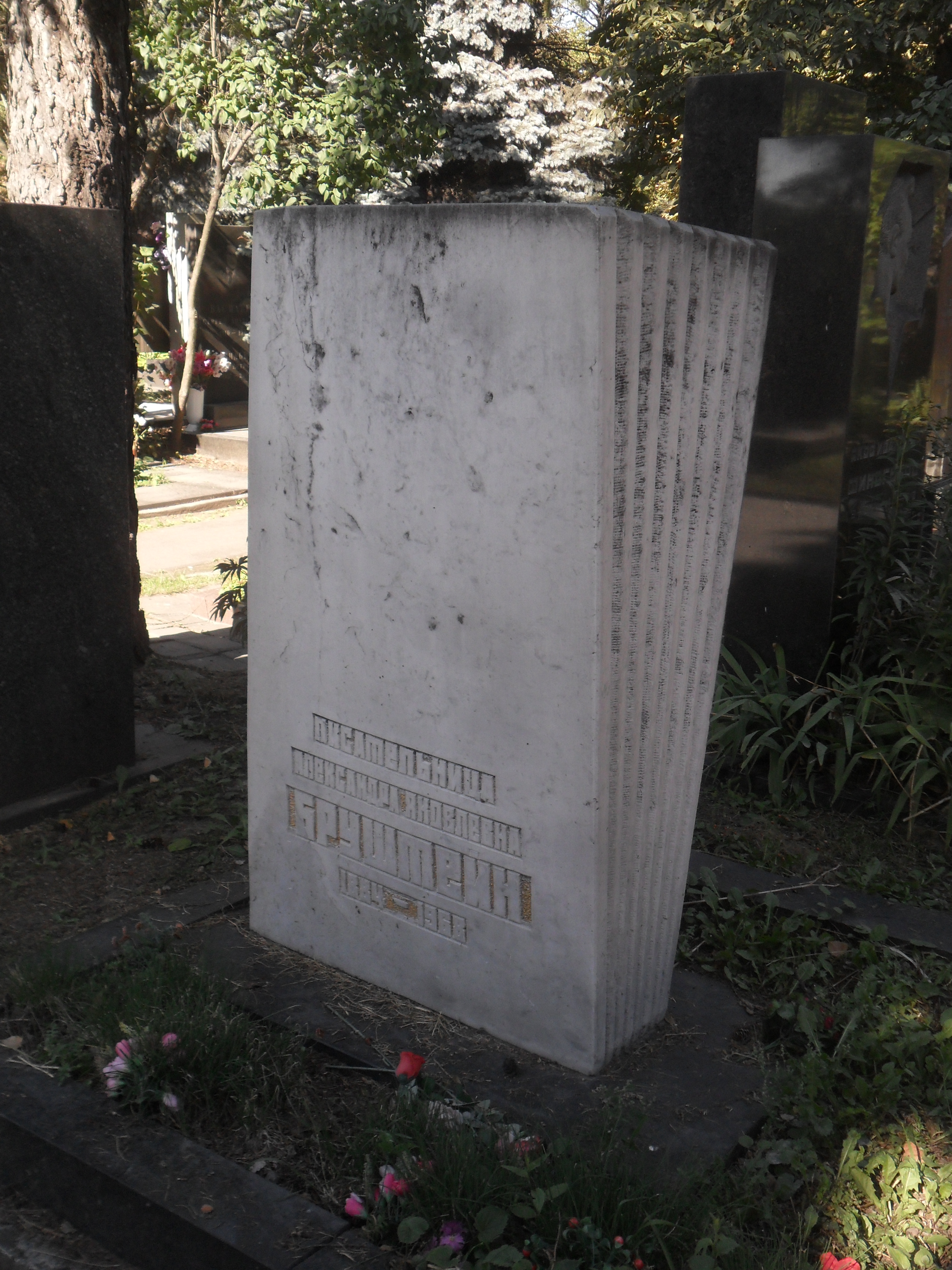
Brushtein's grave in Novodevichy Cemetery, Moscow

Alexandra Yakovlevna Brushtein (Алекса́ндра Я́ковлевна Бруште́йн; née Vygodskaya; 11 August 1884 – 20 September 1968) was a Russian and Soviet writer, playwright, and memoirist. She authored more than sixty plays, mostly for children and youth. But she is most remembered for her widely-acclaimed autobiographical series The Road Goes into the Distance.

== Life ==
Brushtein was born in Vilnius as Alexandra Yakovlevna Vygodskaya. Her father was Jakub Wygodzki, a doctor and writer. Her mother was Yelena Semyonovna Vygodskaya (nee Yadlovkina), also from a medical family. Elena's father, Semyon Mikhailovich Yadlovkin, was a military doctor in Kamianets-Podilskyi.

Brushtein graduated from the Bestuzhev Courses. She participated in the revolutionary movement, and was active in the Political Red Cross.

After the October Revolution, she participated in Likbez, the Soviet campaign to eradicate illiteracy. She organized literacy schools in Petrograd, and worked on creating a repertoire for children's theaters. In 1942 she joined the Communist Party of the Soviet Union.

She died 20 September 1968 in Moscow.

== Works ==
She authored more than sixty plays, mostly for children and youth, and adapted classic works such as Uncle Tom's Cabin and Don Quixote under a pseudonym.

She also authored a collection of theatrical memoirs, Pages of the Past (1952).

=== The Road Goes into the Distance ===
Alexandra Brushtein would become most famous for her autobiographical series The Road Goes into the Distance:

- The Road Goes Into the Distance (1956)
- At Dawn Hour (1958)
- Spring (1961)
- Flowers of Shlisselburg
- Evening Lights (1963)

Written during the Khrushchev Thaw and thus not so heavily restrained by Soviet censorship, the book series is considered one of the best examples of young adult Soviet literature; its popularity has endured in contemporary Russia. The Road Goes into the Distance shows life in the Russian Empire during its last decades from the perspective of a Jewish girl from an educated urban family. The protagonist slowly grows into a revolutionary.

The Zionism of the author's father (who chaired the city's Zionist organization) is never mentioned, the role of Judaism is underplayed, and many Jewish names of the people who became the prototypes of the book's characters are changed to Russian names, which may be attributed both to self-censorship and censorship due to the USSR's policy.

As of 8 July 2023, The Road Goes into the Distance is not translated to English or any other language. The book is "barely known outside the Russian-speaking world".

== Family ==
- Husband Sergei Aleksandrovich Brushtein (1873–1947), one of the founders of Soviet physical therapy.
  - Son Mikhail Sergeyevich Brushtein (1907–1965), participant in the Great Patriotic War, later chief engineer in a confectionery factory and inventor of techniques for producing confectionery.
  - Daughter Nadezhda Nadezhdina (1904–1979), choreographer and ballerina, director of the dance troupe Beryozka.
- Younger brother Semyon Vygodsky (1892–1956), hydrological engineer.
- Uncle Gavril Efimovich Vygodsky, ophthalmologist and head of the department of eye diseases of the Leningrad Institute for Advanced Studies.
  - His son Aleksandr Gavrilovich Vygodsky (died 1941), a historian.
  - His daughter Yevgeniya Maksimovna Kolpakchi, a Japanologist.
