= Nadezhdin =

Nadezhdin (feminine: Nadezhdina) is a surname of Russian origin, derived from the Russian word for "hope". Notable people with the surname include:

- Boris Nadezhdin (born 1963), Russian politician
- Nadezhda Nadezhdina (1904/08–1979), Russian choreographer and ballerina
- Nikolai Nadezhdin (1804–1856), Russian literary critic and ethnographer

== See also ==
- Nadezhda (given name), a Slavic given name of similar origin
