= Dancing Cossacks advertisement =

Political advertisement in New Zealand

"Dancing Cossacks" advertisement
- A scene from the advertisement featuring dancing Cossacks
- Agency: Colenso
- Client: New Zealand National Party
- Running time: 2 minutes, 48 seconds
- Release date: 1975
- Starring: Robert Muldoon
- Country: New Zealand

The "Dancing Cossacks" was a 1975 electoral television advertisement for the New Zealand National Party, produced by advertising agency Colenso. The first half of the advertisement was animated by Hanna-Barbera, with the second half featuring National Party leader Robert Muldoon. The advert was produced to be highly critical of the governing New Zealand Labour Party's recently introduced compulsory superannuation scheme, implying the scheme would eventually turn New Zealand into a Soviet-style communist state, and urged people to vote for National in the upcoming general election.

== Background ==
The Third Labour Government introduced a compulsory superannuation scheme in 1974, with the scheme beginning on 1 April 1975.

Every employee aged between 17 and retirement age would have 4% of their gross wage deducted, with this deduction being matched by their employer and paid to the Superannuation Corporation. The Corporation would bank the money received in individual accounts, and would contribute money to individual accounts earned by investments on its own part. When the person reached retirement age, their money would gradually be paid out of their account back to them as income.

In many respects, the scheme was similar to the modern KiwiSaver scheme, introduced by the Fifth Labour Government in 2007, but unlike the 1975 scheme, KiwiSaver is voluntary, and investments are carried out by multiple providers; Inland Revenue is responsible only for collection and on-payment.

The National Party saw this scheme as socialist, and claimed that the Government, through the Superannuation Corporation, would eventually end up gaining control of a large proportion of the country's property and shares. The compulsory superannuation scheme subsequently became a major issue approaching the 29 November general election.

== Advert ==
The three-minute advert starts explaining the compulsory superannuation scheme's introduction on 1 April, and that the Labour government called it a bold piece of social legislation. The narrator then says it was a poor April Fool's joke (referencing the introduction of the scheme on 1 April), and notes that Labour did not tell the full story of the scheme: nobody would receive the scheme's full benefit until 2028, and it would not pay anything at all to housewives, those aged over 55, or those on Social Security.

After saying it was a bad idea, the narrator explains that it is dangerous: Labour would soon be deducting money from wage earners and spending it. In seven years, they would have enough money to buy every share in every company in New Zealand, followed by every farm, and eventually the whole country. Following this, the narrator asks "And you know what that's called, don't you?" before several Cossacks squat-dance across the screen to the tune of Aram Khachaturian's "Sabre Dance" in front of a concerned-looking man, implying the answer to the question was communism (despite the fact that the Cossacks were traditionally opponents to the communist Bolsheviks).

The advert then cuts to National Party leader Muldoon, who explains if National won the election, it would repeal the compulsory superannuation scheme, refund money that workers and employers had paid in, and replace it with its "fairer" and universal National Superannuation, explaining its benefits, and then urging people to vote National. The advert ended with the National Party logo and its campaign slogan: "New Zealand. The way YOU want it".

== Aftermath ==
Even though the advert played only twice on New Zealand television, it became a famous part of New Zealand political advertising history.

As a result of the advert and other campaigning against Labour's compulsory superannuation scheme, the National Party won the election by a landslide, gaining 55 of the 87 seats in the New Zealand House of Representatives. Within three weeks of taking office, the new National government fulfilled their promise and abolished the compulsory superannuation scheme, replacing it with National Superannuation.
