= Trepak (The Nutcracker) =

Movement of The Nutcracker by Tchaikovsky

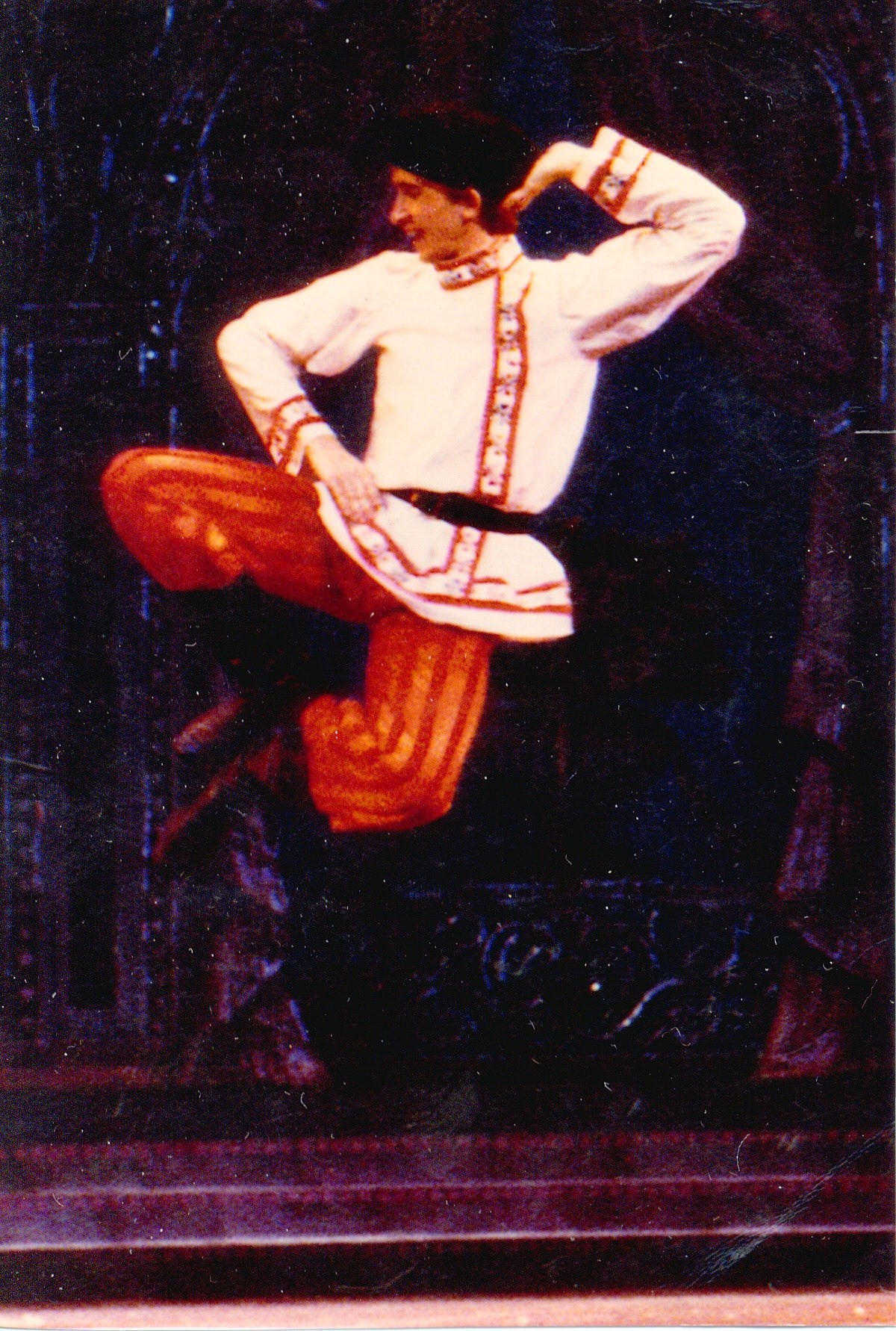

Trepak (Russian: Трепак; Ukrainian: Трoпак or Трiпак), also referred to as the Russian dance, is one of the character dances from Pyotr Ilyich Tchaikovsky's famous 1892 ballet The Nutcracker. It is based on the traditional Russian and Ukrainian folk dance also called the trepak.

The piece is part of the Divertissement in Act II, Tableau III. The other character dances in this divertissement are: Chocolate (Spanish dance), Coffee (Arabian dance) and Tea (Chinese dance).

Tchaikovsky's Trepak is written in AABA form. Its tempo is molto vivace – prestissimo, the time signature is 2/4, and the key is G major.
