= Beryozki, Volgograd Oblast =

Beryozki Берёзки
- Khutor
- Location within Volgograd Oblast Location within Russia
- Coordinates: 49°36′N 42°44′E
- Country: Russia
- Region: Volgograd Oblast
- District: Serafimovichsky District
- Time zone: UTC+4:00

Beryozki (Russian: Берёзки) is a rural locality (a khutor) in Zimnyatskoye Rural Settlement, Serafimovichsky District, Volgograd Oblast, Russia. The population was 151 as of 2010. There are 3 streets.

== Geography ==
Beryozki is located on the Don River, 5 km north of Serafimovich (the district's administrative centre) by road. Serafimovich is the nearest rural locality.
