= Yablochko =

Chastushka-style folk song and dance

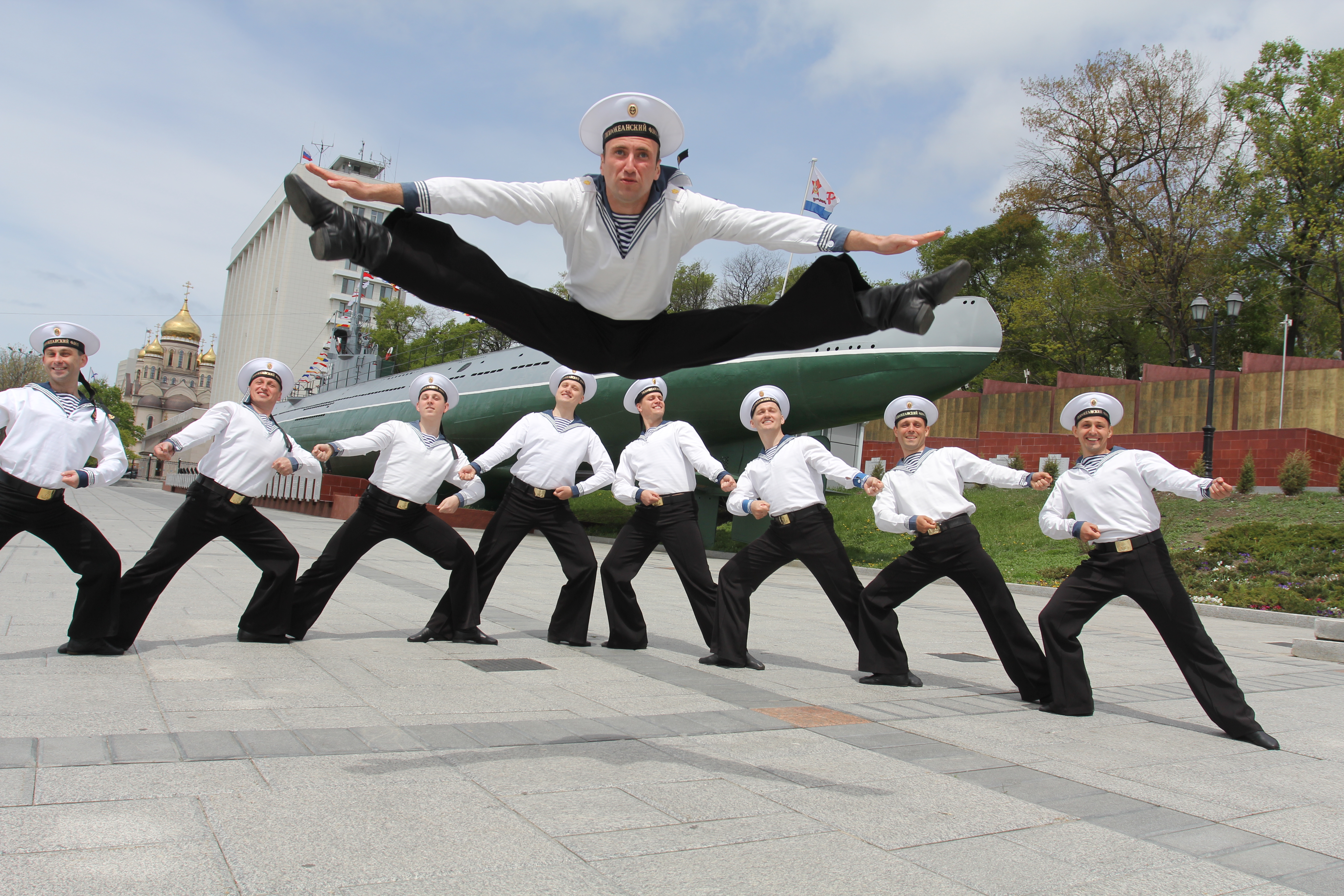
Yablochko performance

melody

Yablochko in an experimental 1946 Soviet short

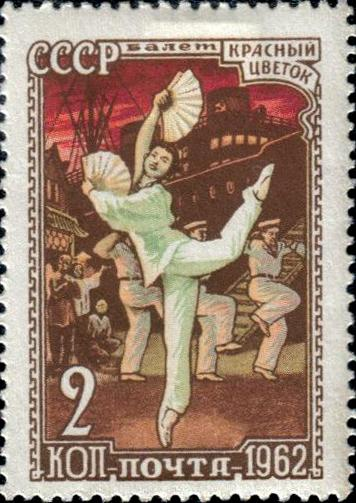
Sailors from The Red Poppy ballet dancing Yablochko in the backplane

Yablochko (Russian: Яблoчко, lit. 'little apple') is a chastushka-style folk song and dance, traditionally presented as a sailors' dance.

The choreographed version of the dance first appeared in the 1926 Reinhold Glière ballet The Red Poppy and from there is known in the West as the Russian Sailors Dance.

== History ==
=== Song ===
There is no "canonic" song under this name, although numerous texts are known, their common part being only its tune and the signature lines starting with "Эх, яблочко..." ("Ekh, Yablochko", "Eh, little apple"), in numerous versions: "Eh little apple, where are you rolling?" (Эх, яблочко, Да куда котишься?), "Eh little apple on the saucer" (Эх яблочко, да на тарелочке!), etc. Verses of this kind proliferated during the Russian Civil War, in Red, Black and White camps. The song itself has nothing to do with apples, with its verse commonly being related to the political issues of the time.

A variant of this song, written by Yuliy Kim, is sung by Sharikov (transformed from a stray dog) before the medical commission in the 1988 film Heart of a Dog: "Эх, яблочко, да с голубикою. Подходи, буржуй, глазик выколю!" (Erh, little apple, with bog blueberry, Come here bourgeois man, I'll gouge out your eye!).

=== Dance ===
Researchers believe that the "Yablochko" dance appeared as a synthesis of the British and Ireland hornpipe dance and Russian traditional dance.
