= Trepak =

Russian and Ukrainian folk dance

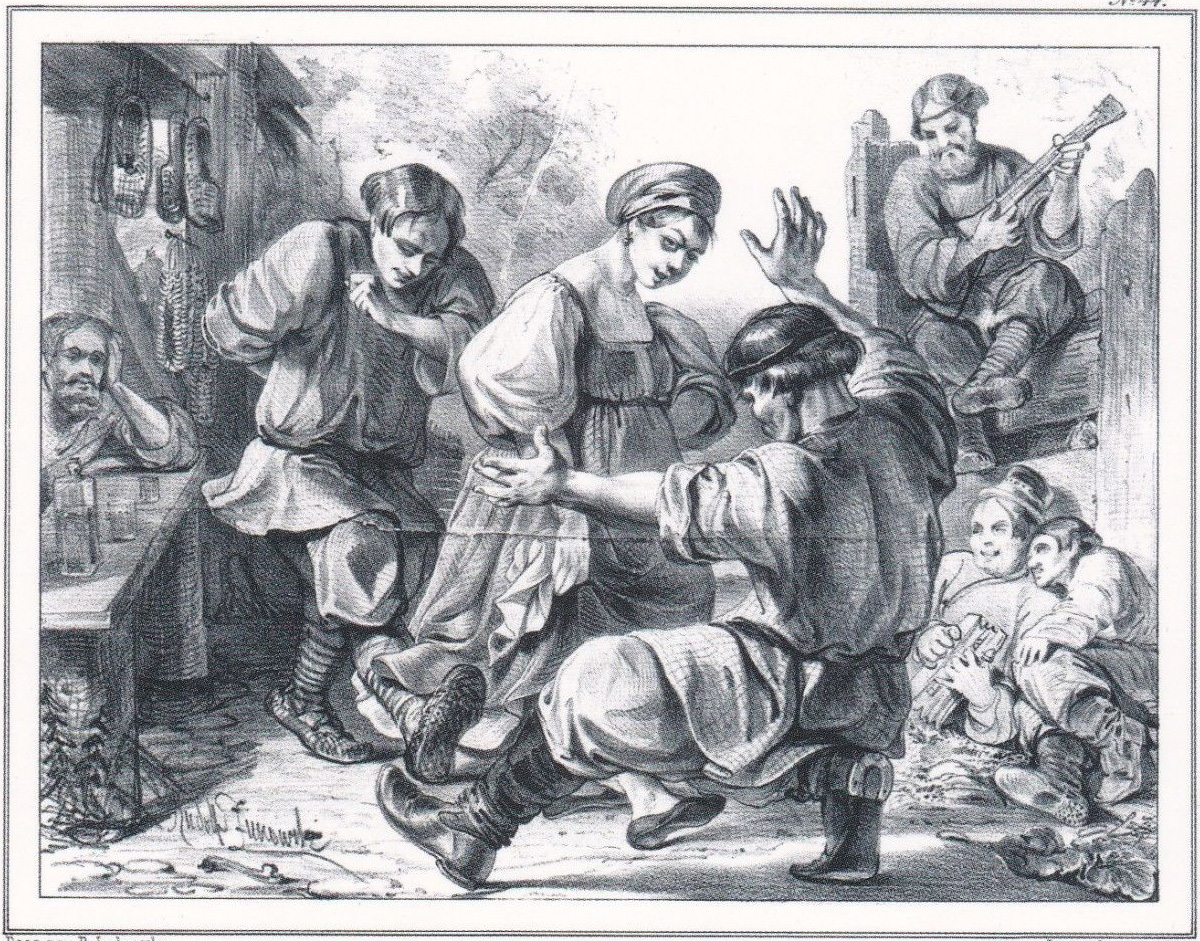
Trepak on a 19th-century postcard

Trepak (Russian: трeпак) or tropak (Ukrainian: трoпак) is a traditional East Slavic folk dance (Russian and Ukrainian).

The dance is included in China's list of intangible cultural heritage of the Xinjiang Uygur Autonomous Region, whose form is preserved in Tacheng.

== Description ==
Russian researchers have pointed out the similarities to the Kamarinskaya or Barynya, while Ukrainian researchers have compared it to the Hopak with nuances of a Kozachok.

The Russian researcher Larisa Timoshenko describes the process as follows: "The Trepak usually began with an “entrance.” The man who wanted to dance would step into the middle of the circle, straighten up, tilt his head back slightly, put his hands on his hips or cross them over his chest, and stand there for a while, concentrating before the dance and allowing the audience to feel the importance of the moment. After a few seconds, another dancer would come out to meet him and take the same pose. The accordionists would sharply stretch the bellows of their accordions, the first dancer would strike the ground with the sole of his foot, wave his arms widely, with his right arm raised higher than his left, and the dance would begin. One stood in place, performing various knee movements with his feet, moving his shoulders and the entire upper part of his torso. The other dancer spun around in place, threw himself to his knees, rushed around in a squat, crawled, twisted, and kicked his legs in different directions. All this was performed with enthusiasm, passion, and complete dedication."

The characteristic element is a simple walk with a syncopated stamp, often done to a quick duple meter rhythm.

On So You Think You Can Dance (Season 4), Joshua Allen and Stephen "Twitch" Boss performed a Trepak routine, interpreted as a dance duel, in Week 9 (August 6, 2008).

== Music ==
The dance is a brisk allegro in 2/4 time in a major key. Accompaniment is usually on two alternating chords: dominant and tonic.

=== Folk songs ===
Ukrainian example
Ukrainian lyrics	Ukrainian romanized	English translation
Ой, піду я на музики, Бо дав батько п'ятака, Закружуся я набоки, Та вдарю я тропака.	Oi, pidu ya na muzyky, Bo dav baťko pjiataka, Zakruzhusia ya naboky, Ta vdariu ya tropaka.	Oh, I'll go to the musicians, Because my father gave me 5 kopecks, I'll spin around, And I'll hit the Tropak.
Приспів: Туп, туп ніженьками, Цок, брязь підківками! Гоп-чук-га, тропака, Бо я зроду така!	Chorus: Tup, tup nizheńkamy, Tsok, briaź pidkivkamy! Hop-chuk-ha, tropaka, Bo ya zrodu taka!	Chorus: Stomp, stomp with your feet, Clack, clack with your horseshoes! Hop-chuck-ha, tropak, Because that's how I am from birth!

Ukrainian folk lyrics mostly mention female solo dancers performing the Tropak, sometimes there are mentions of paired dancing.

Lyrics used my M. Lysenko and M.Kropyvnytskyi
Ukrainian lyrics	Ukrainian romanized	English translation
Ой гоп тини-ни Вари, жінко, лини. Годі спати, жартувати, Щоб не довелось стогнати.	Oi hop, tyny-ny Vary, zhinko, lyny. Hodi spaty, zhartuvaty, Shchob ne doveloś stohnaty.	Oh, hop, tyny-ny Cook, my wife, the tenches. Stop sleeping, stop joking, So you don't end up groaning.
Приспів: Гриць мене, моя мати, Гриць мене полюбив, Гриць мені, моя мати, Черевички купив.	Chorus: Hryć mene, moia maty, Hryć mene poliubyv, Hryć meni, moia maty, CHerevychky kupyv.	Chorus: Hryts, my mother, Hryts fell in love with me, Hryts, my mother, Bought me shoes.
Купив мені черевички За цілого п’ятака, Щоб я зранку до вечора Вибивала тропака.	Kupyv meni cherevychky Za tsiloho pjiataka, Shchob ya zranku do vechora Vybyvala tropaka.	He bought me shoes For a whole 5 kopecks, So that from morning till night I could hit the Tropak.

=== In classical music ===
Trepak
Tchaikovsky's Russian Dance, based on the original Trepak

The "Neva variation" (in the Moscow production, the Moskva River) in Marius Petipa's ballet The Pharaoh's Daughter (1862) ended with a Trepak.

The third of Anton Rubinstein's Seven National Dances, Op.82 (1868) is named "Russkaya I Trepak" and is split into two movements.

The third of Modest Mussorgsky's Songs and Dances of Death (mid-1870s) is named "Trepak".

The dance was also used in the last movement of Pyotr Ilyich Tchaikovsky's Violin Concerto in D major, Op. 35 (1878).

The sixth of Zygmunt Noskowski's Ruthenian Melodies (Mélodies ruthéniennes), Op. 33 (1891) is named "Tropak".

One of its best known representations is "Trepak" (also known as the "Russian Dance") from Tchaikovsky's ballet The Nutcracker (1892).

It is featured in the “Dance and Song of the Skomorokhs” from the first scene of Nikolai Rimsky-Korsakov's opera-bylina “Sadko” (1897).

The "Russian dance" in Igor Stravinsky's ballet Petrushka (1911) features a Trepak.

An arrangement of a Ukrainian folk variant for orchestra and soprano titled "Tropak" by Louis Katzman has been recorded in 1928 at Brunswick records in the USA.
