= Beryozka, Vladimir Oblast =

Beryozka Берёзка
- Settlement
- Location within Vladimir Oblast Location within Russia
- Coordinates: 55°58′N 39°26′E
- Country: Russia
- Region: Vladimir Oblast
- District: Petushinsky District
- Time zone: UTC+3:00

Beryozka (Russian: Берёзка) is a rural locality (a settlement) in Petushinskoye Rural Settlement, Petushinsky District, Vladimir Oblast, Russia. The population was 702 as of 2010.

== Geography ==
Beryozka is located 11 km north of Petushki (the district's administrative centre) by road. Kibirevo is the nearest rural locality.
