= Barynya =

Russian folk dance and music

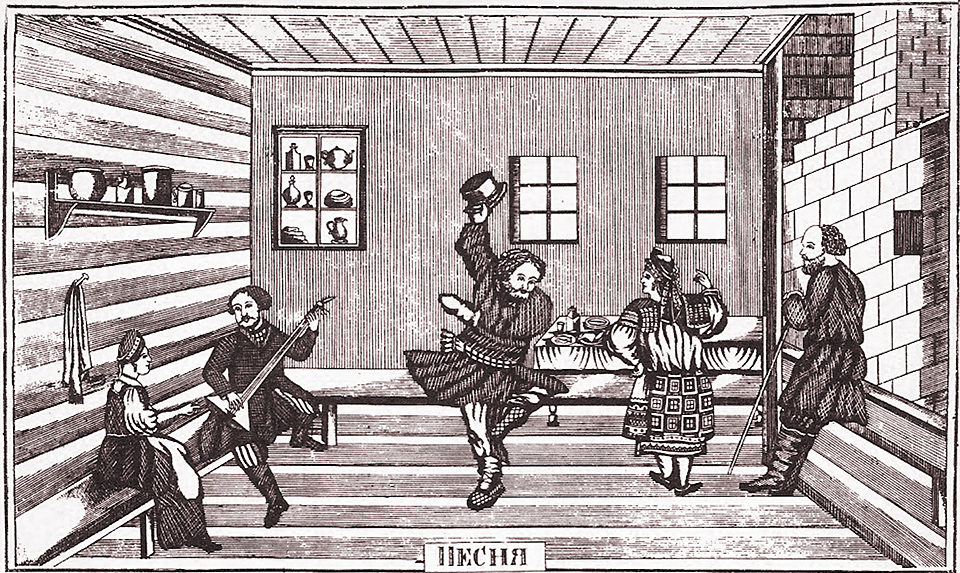
Barynya, 19th-century lubok

Barynya (Russian: барыня) is a fast Russian folk dance accompanied by music. The dance originated in the Central Russian Upland.

== Etymology ==
The word barynya (Russian: барыня, lit. 'landlady') was historically used in the Russian lands as a form of addressing a woman of higher class, and is the feminine form for the word barin, meaning "landlord".

== Description ==
The dance is an alternation of chastushkas and frenetic dancing. Originally the dancing was without special choreography. The main characteristics of the barynya dance are traditional elements of Russian folk dance like Russian squatting, rotations, jumps and sprited stomping. The main instruments of baryna are the Balalaika and Garmon.

The barynya chastushkas traditionally included a refrain, such as "Барыня, барыня, сударыня-барыня" (Barynya, barynya, sudarynya-barynya), or "Барыня ты моя, сударыня ты моя". The content was often humoristic and sometimes even lewd.

There are a number of scenic, more refined versions of the dance.

A number of Russian folkloric dance ensembles bear the name.
