= Nadezhda Nadezhdina =

Russian choreographer and ballerina

- Born: Nadezhda Brushtein; June 6, 1904/1908; Vilna, Russian Empire
- Died: October 11, 1979 (aged 71)
- Resting place: Novodevichy Cemetery, Moscow
- Education: Second State Ballet School, St. Petersburg
- Mother: Alexandra Brushtein
- Awards: Joliot-Curie Gold Medal of Peace

Nadezhda Sergeevna Nadezhdina (née Brushtein; Russian: Надежда Сергеевна Надеждина; June 6, 1904/1908 – October 11, 1979) was a Russian and Soviet choreographer, ballerina, and former director of the Russian female dance troupe Beryozka ("little birch") from its inception in 1948 until her death. She is the daughter of prominent writer Aleksandra Iakovlevna Brushtein. She is known for the way she taught her dancers to move across a stage without seeming to move their feet. Beneath long, nearly floor-length gowns, her dancers learned to walk on the very tips of their toes, resulting in the impression that they are floating or gliding across the stage. She was the winner of the Stalin Prize of the third degree in 1950 and the Frederic Joliot-Curie Prize in 1959.

She based her dances on regional folk forms but had music specially composed for her troupe. She added men to her choreography in 1961.

The first performers of the dance "Beryozka" were young collective farmers of the Kalinin (now Tver) region, participating in the festival of rural folk talent in 1948. The performances involved twenty girls in long sundresses, stately and with a beautiful bearing, walking silently around the stage in a patterned dance, holding young birch branches in their hands.
