= Kamarinskaya =

Russian folk dance

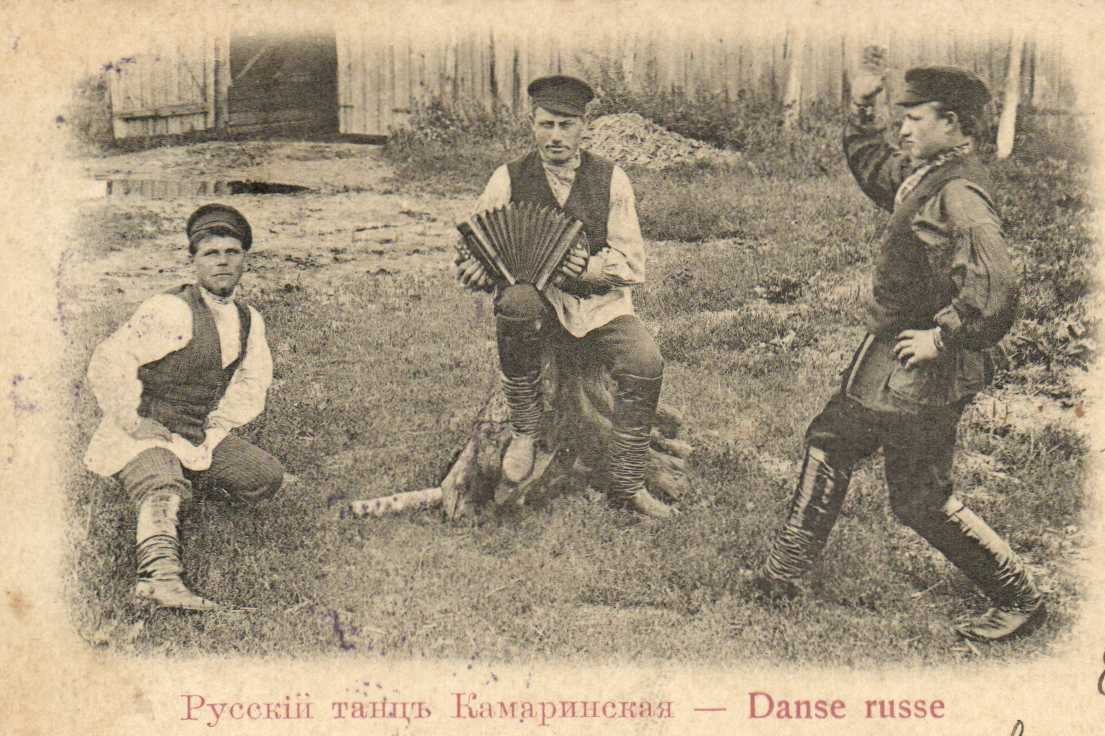
Kamarinskaya. Russian Empire

Kamarinskaya (Russian: камаринская) is a traditional Russian folk dance, which is mostly known today as the Russian composer Mikhail Glinka's composition of the same name. Glinka's Kamarinskaya, written in 1848, was the first orchestral work based entirely on Russian folk song and to use the compositional principles of that genre to dictate the form of the music. It premiered on 15 March 1850. It became a touchstone for the following generation of Russian composers ranging from the Western-oriented Pyotr Ilyich Tchaikovsky to the group of nationalists known collectively as The Five and was also lauded abroad, most notably by French composer Hector Berlioz.

== Traditional Kamarinskaya ==
According to musicologist Richard Taruskin, the traditional Kamarinskaya is "a quick dance tune" otherwise known as a naigrish, distinctive for its three-bar phrase lengths, which are played in an endless number of variations in moto perpetuo fashion by an instrumentalist. This tune usually accompanies a squatting dance often called a Kazatsky (especially since in the West it has been associated in romantic fashion with Cossacks) and is played traditionally by a fiddler, a balalika player or a concertina player

== Kamarinskaya by Glinka ==
Mikhail Glinka composed his Kamarinskaya in 1848. It became famous as the first orchestral work based entirely on Russian folk song.

=== Composition ===
Glinka's Kamarinskaya is based on two themes, a slow bridal song, "Iz-za gor" (From beyond the mountains), and the title song, a naigrïsh. This second song is actually an instrumental dance played to an ostinato melody. This melody is repeated for as long as the dancers can move to it. Glinka begins with "Iz-za gor," then introduces Kamarinskaya as a contrasting theme. He uses a transition to return to the bridal song and show the contrast between the two themes. Another transition, this time using motifs from the bridal song, leads to the dance theme and the piece ends with the Kamarinskaya dance. As in traditional nagriish songs, Glinka uses three-bar phrase lengths throughout the fast sections of his composition.

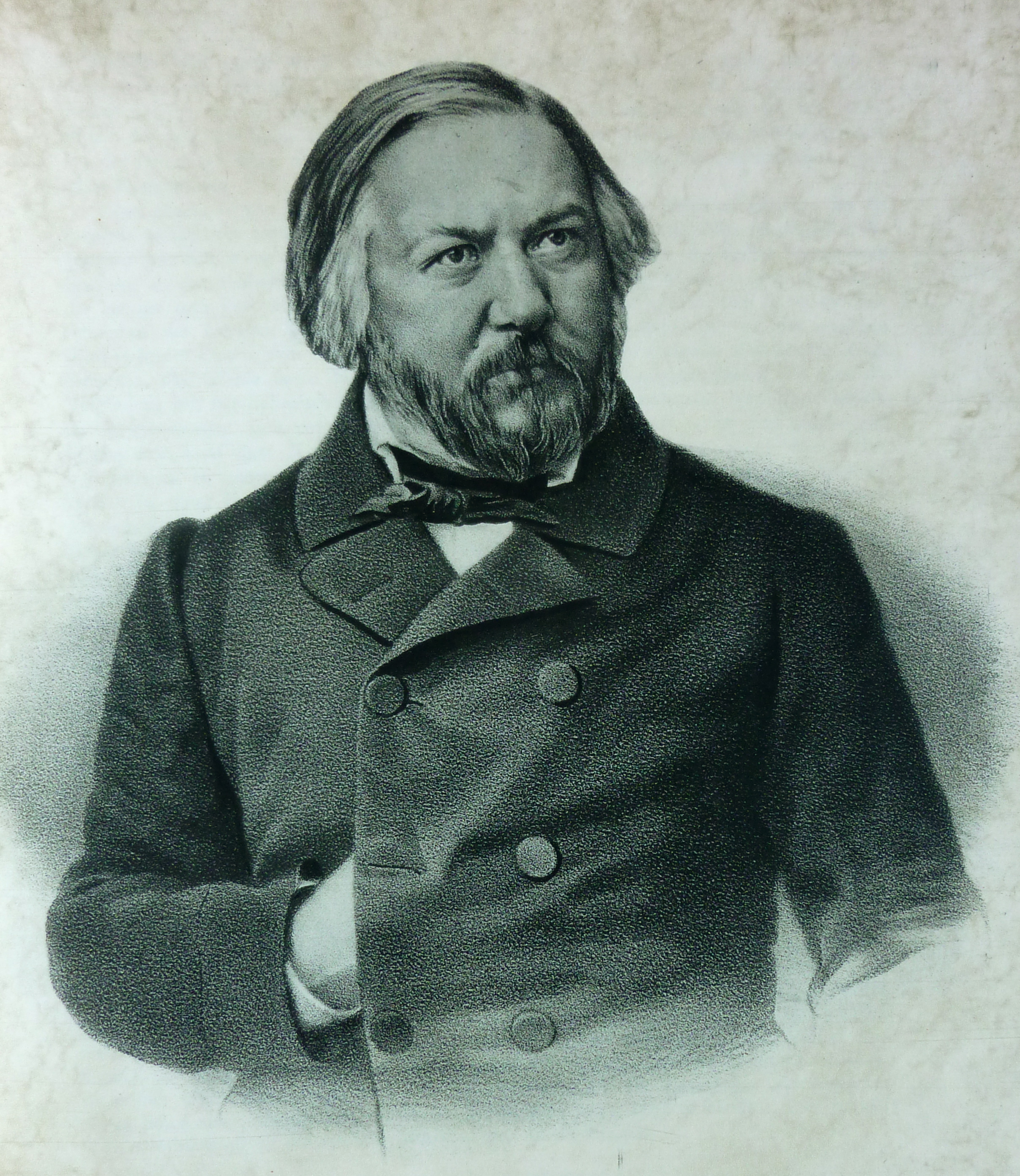
Mikhail Glinka

The structure and mechanics of Kamarinskaya differ markedly from Western European compositional principles and in some ways are diametrically opposed to them. In a Western piece, after the first theme is introduced and harmony propels the music forward, it modulates to introduce a second theme in a contrasting musical key. The two themes then interact and the composition grows as an organic creation. Tension continues building as this thematic dialogue becomes increasingly complex. This dialogue or interchange eventually propels the piece to a climactic point of resolution. Kamarinskaya does not follow this pattern. Nor can it. The ostinato melody of the second song will not allow any motivic development without distorting the character of the piece. Glinka therefore uses the principle of repetition from folk song to allowing the musical structure to unfold. He repeats the theme 75 times, all the while varying the background material—the instrumental timbres, harmonization and counterpoint. This way, he preserves the original character of the dance and complements it with creative variations in the orchestral treatment. However, because there is no thematic growth, the music remains static. It does not move forward as a Western piece of music would.

=== Influence on Tchaikovsky ===
Pyotr Ilyich Tchaikovsky, who had received Western-oriented musical instruction from the Saint Petersburg Conservatory, had used folk songs in his student overture The Storm. However, in the early 1870s he became interested in using folk songs as valid symphonic material. Tchaikovsky's greatest debt in this regard was to Glinka's Kamarinskaya. He believed fervently that in Kamarinskaya lay the core of the entire school of Russian symphonic music, "just as the whole oak is in the acorn", as he would write in his diary in 1888.

Pyotr Ilyich Tchaikovsky

Tchaikovsky's interest resulted in his Second Symphony, composed in 1872. Because Tchaikovsky used three Ukrainian folk songs to great effect in this work, it was nicknamed the "Little Russian" (Russian: Малороссийская, Malorossiyskaya) by Nikolay Kashkin, a friend of the composer as well as a well-known musical critic of Moscow. Ukraine was at that time frequently called "Little Russia". Successful upon its premiere, the symphony also won the favor of the group of nationalistic Russian composers known as The Five, led by Mily Balakirev.

For Tchaikovsky, Kamarinskaya offered a viable example of the creative possibilities of folk songs in a symphonic structure, using a variety of harmonic and contrapuntal combinations. It also offered a blueprint on how such a structure could be made to work, barring the potential for inertia or over-repetition. The development of the folk material, according to one biographer, is "the most heady potion Tchaikovsky ever brewed". Without Kamarinskaya, however, Tchaikovsky knew he would not have had a foundation upon which to build that finale.

== See also ==
- Russian folk dance
- Music of Russia

== Bibliography ==
- Brown, David, Tchaikovsky: The Early Years, 1840–1874 (New York: W.W. Norton & Company, 1978). ISBN 0-393-07535-2.
- Brown, David, Tchaikovsky: The Final Years, 1885–1893, (New York: W.W. Norton & Company, 1991). ISBN 0-393-03099-7.
- Figes, Orlando, Natasha's Dance: A Cultural History of Russia (New York: Metropolitan Books, 2002). ISBN 0-8050-5783-8 (hc.).
- Holden, Anthony, Tchaikovsky: A Biography (New York: Random House, 1995). ISBN 0-679-42006-1.
- Maes, Francis, tr. Arnold J. Pomerans and Erica Pomerans, A History of Russian Music: From Kamarinskaya to Babi Yar (Berkeley, Los Angeles and London: University of California Press, 2002). ISBN 0-520-21815-9.
- Taruskin, Richard, On Russian Music (Berkeley and Los Angeles: University of California Press, 2009). ISBN 0-520-26806-7.
- Warrack, John, Tchaikovsky Symphonies and Concertos (Seattle: University of Washington Press, 1969). Library of Congress Catalog Card No. 78–105437.
