= Beryozka (Russian dance troupe) =

Russian dance troupe

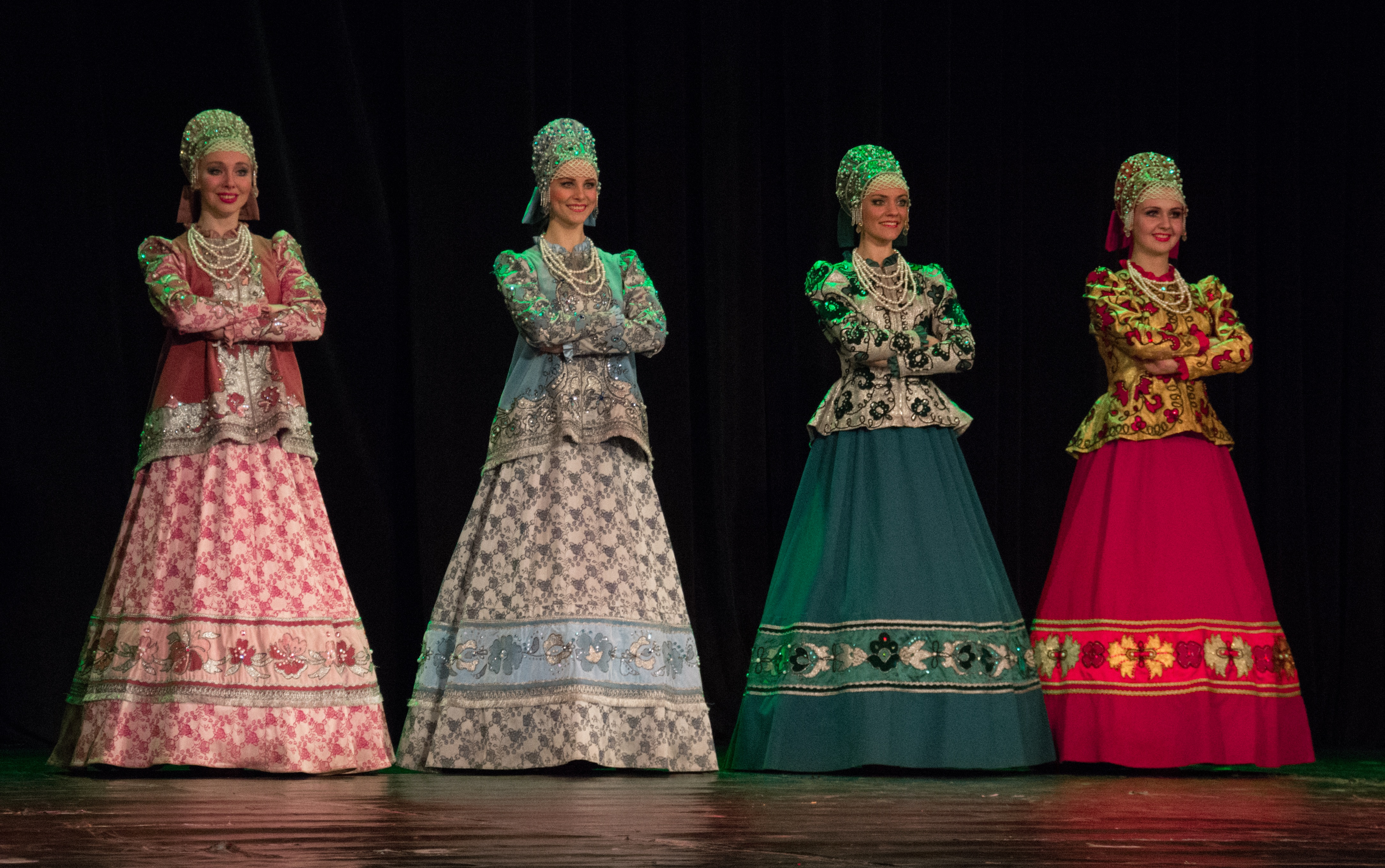
Members of the Beryozka troupe in the folk clothing of ethnic Russians

The Beryozka, or Berezka, Dance Ensemble (Russian: Берёзка, lit. 'little birch tree') is a troupe of female dancers founded by Soviet choreographer and dancer Nadezhda Nadezhdina in 1948 in the Soviet Union which specializes in performing in long gowns and moving across the stage as though gliding or floating. Although often considered a form of folk dancing, its founder once stated, "Beryozka's dances are not folk dances. They are dances whose source is the creative work of the people. But these dances are composed by me."

The floating step is difficult to perform. According to Nadezhdina, "Not even all our dancers can do it. You have to move in very small steps on very low half‐toe with the body held in a certain corresponding position". The troupe began touring in Western countries in the 1950s. The 22 September 1951 performance at the hall of the Stockholm Musical Academy in Sweden, for example, drew crowds too large to be accommodated.
