= Yove male mome =

Bulgarian folk dance

Yove male mome (Bulgarian: Йове мале моме; Jove male mome, Jove malaj mome, "Jova, little girl"), also called Povela e Yova (Повела е Йова), is a fast Bulgarian folk dance. It is done to a 7+11/16 = 18/16 compound meter with alternating (sub-)bars of 7+11, in their turn divided into common chetvorno and kopanitsa rhythms. Some dancers count it as 3-2-2, 2-2-3-2-2 or SQQ-QQSQQ, "S" meaning "slow", and "Q" meaning "quick". It originates from the traditional dance Jove from the Shopluk region of Bulgaria.

Yove male mome is a complicated line dance performed in a curved line or open circle, with each dancer holding their neighbours by the belt. Dancers may also hold hands if belts are not available. One common version has seven patterns of four bars each. Musical renditions of the song often feature the traditional Bulgarian gaida.

The dance is popular among international folk dancers around the world. Its choreography was first introduced outside of Bulgaria by US folkdance instructor Dennis Boxell in Stockton, California, 1966.

== Lyrics ==
Повела е Йова - хоро

Повела е Йова, леле,
два коня на вода, леле,
два коня на вода.
Йове, мала моме, леле,
Йове, мала моме.
Па си един пои, леле,
с вода размътена,
а другия пои
с вода избистрена.
Що си коня пои
с вода размътена,
този ѝ е коня
на милото братче.
Що си коня пои
с вода избистрена,
този ѝ е коня
на милото либе.

From Манол Тодоров, Българска народна музика, Музика Софна (1976), p. 109.

== See also ==
- Bulgarian dances
- List of ethnic, regional, and folk dances by origin
