= Aksak =

Rhythmic system in Ottoman musical theory

In Ottoman musical theory, aksak (Ottoman Turkish: آغساق, romanized: aġsak) is a rhythmic system in which pieces or sequences, executed in a fast tempo, are based on the uninterrupted reiteration of a matrix, which results from the juxtaposition of rhythmic cells based on the alternation of binary and ternary quantities, as in 2+3, 2+2+3, 2+3+3, etc. The name literally means "limping", "stumbling", or "slumping", and has been borrowed by Western ethnomusicologists to refer generally to irregular, or additive meters.

In Turkish folk music, these metres occur mainly in vocal and instrumental dance music, though they are found also in some folksongs. Strictly speaking, in Turkish music theory the term refers only to the grouping of nine pulses into a pattern of 2+2+2+3. Some examples are shown below.

Units	Subdivision	Name(s)
5	2+3	Türk Aksağı [Bulg: Paidushko]
5	3+2	
7	2+2+3	Devr-i Turan [Bulg. Račenica]
7	2+3+2	
7	3+2+2	Devr-i Hindi [Bulg. Lesnoto, Četvorno]
9	2+2+2+3	Aksak [Bulg. Daychovo]
9	3+2+2+2	
9	2+2+3+2	
9	2+3+2+2	[Bulg: Grancharsko]
11	2+2+2+2+3	
11	2+2+3+2+2	[Bulg. Gankino]
13	2+2+2+2+2+3	[Bulg. Elenino horo]
13	2+2+2+3+2+2	[Bulg. Krivo Sadovsko horo]
13	3+4+4+2	Şarkı Devr-i Revâni
15	2+2+2+2+3+2+2	[Bulg. Bučimiš]
18	(3+2+2) + (2+2+3+2+2)	[Bulg. Jove Malaj Mome]
22	(2+2+2+3) + (2+2+2+3) + (2+2)	[Bulg. Sandansko Horo]
25	(3+2+2) + (3+2+2) + (2+2+3) + (2+2)	[Bulg. Sedi Donka]

== In jazz ==
The aksak rhythm 2+2+2+3/8 is prominently featured in the jazz standard "Blue Rondo à la Turk" by Dave Brubeck.

== In rock ==
The Belgian experimental rock group Aksak Maboul take their name from this rhythm.

== See also ==
- Additive rhythm and divisive rhythm
