= Rain on the Roof (album) =

Studio album by Andy Irvine
- Released: 1996
- Recorded: June–August 1996, in County Cork and County Kerry
- Genre: Irish/Balkan/American folk music
- Length: 46:51
- Label: Andy Irvine (Ireland)
- Producer: Ray Barron, Steve Cooney

Andy Irvine chronology
East Wind (1992)	Rain on the Roof (1996)	Way Out Yonder (2000)

Rain on the Roof is Andy Irvine's third solo album and also the first released on his own label, Andy Irvine, under product number "AK-1".

== Recording ==
Recorded in June, July and August 1996, it is the closest the listener could get to the experience of attending one of his live performances.

Most of the recordings on this CD were done as if live. That is to say I sat in front of microphones with my bouzouki or mandolin in my lap, my harmonica in its holder round my neck, and my drone volume pedal on the floor, under my foot, and played and sang all in one go.

Other instruments were added (on four of the eleven tracks) by Rens van der Zalm (fiddle and mandolin), Stephen Cooney (didgeridoo, Kpanlogo drum), Declan Masterson (low whistle) and Irvine himself, who played a second mandolin on two of the tracks.

The album opens with "Prince Among Men", a song about the hazards and dangers of working underground in a mine–which Irvine wrote from the perspective of a man whose late father, James Doyle, had been a miner.

"Băneasă's Green Glade" is a re-worked version of the song he had first recorded with Planxty, followed this time around by "Rumen Sirakov's Daichevo", Irvine's solo adaptation of "Didinata", a dance tune in 9/8 time (3–2–2–2) composed by Bulgarian tambura player Rumen Sirakov.

"Rain on the Roof/The Blue Mountains of New South Wales" is a self-penned set of jigs.

"My Heart's Tonight in Ireland" is Irvine's nostalgic recollection of the times he spent touring in County Clare with Sweeney's Men.

"Forgotten Hero" is a passionate song reminiscing about the life and struggle of Michael Davitt, the founder of the Irish National Land League.

Then comes a set of Bulgarian dance tunes: "Pamela's Rŭtchenitsa" in 7/16 time, "Gruncharsko Horo" in 9/16 time and "Baker's Dozen", an apt and witty title for a dance tune in 13/16 time.

"He Fades Away" is a poignant song written by Alistair Hulett, about the compensation due to the young men who died from exposure to blue asbestos in the Wittenoom mine in Western Australia in the 1940s.

"Come With Me Over The Mountain" is Irvine's adaptation of H61a from Sam Henry's collection (Songs of the People), followed by another self-penned jig: "A Smile In The Dark".

"The Monument (Lest We Forget)" is Irvine's revisiting of the Ludlow Massacre in the coalfields of Southern Colorado on 20 April 1914.

With "Take No Prisoners/Old Brunswick", we find Irvine combining rhythms and musical phrases from the Irish and Greek traditions.

The album closes with "Never Tire of the Road", Irvine's tribute to his lifelong hero, Woody Guthrie. In this updated version, Irvine included the chorus from a song Guthrie recorded in March 1944: "You Fascists Are Bound to Lose".

== Track listing ==
1. "Prince Among Men" (Andy Irvine) – 4:05
2. "Băneasă's Green Glade"/"Rumen Sirakov's Daichevo" (Andy Irvine) – 6:02
3. "Rain on the Roof/The Blue Mountains of New South Wales" (Andy Irvine) – 3:20
4. "My Heart's Tonight in Ireland" (Andy Irvine) – 3:46
5. "Forgotten Hero" (Andy Irvine) – 5:46
6. "Pamela's Rŭtchenitsa" (Steve Finney) / "Gruncharsko Horo"/"Baker's Dozen" (Traditional; arranged by Andy Irvine) – 3:27
7. "He Fades Away" (Alistair Hulett) – 4:21
8. "Come With Me Over The Mountain" (New words & music: Andy Irvine) / "A Smile In The Dark" (Andy Irvine) – 4:31
9. "The Monument (Lest We Forget)" (Andy Irvine) – 3.46
10. "Take No Prisoners/Old Brunswick" (Andy Irvine) – 2:42
11. "Never Tire of the Road" (Andy Irvine) – 5:05

== Personnel ==
- Andy Irvine – vocals, bouzouki, harmonica, drone, shruti box, mandolin
- Rens van der Zalm – fiddle, mandolin
- Steve Cooney – didgeridoo, Kpanlogo drum
- Declan Masterson – low whistle
