= Undecuple meter =

Meter with each bar divided into 11 notes of equal duration

11/4 time signature at 60 BPM

Undecuple meter or undecuple time is a musical meter in which each measure is divided into 11 equally spaced beats, usually notated as either 11/4 or 11/8. It is usually subdivided into groupings of two or three beats (for example, a grouping of the meter could be 2+2+2+2+3).

The meter remained largely unused until the 19th century, when Nikolai Rimsky-Korsakov used it in his operas The Snow Maiden and Sadko.

Because 11 is a prime number, undecuple meter is considered a complex time signature. It can be found in jazz, pop, and rock music.

== In folk music ==
=== Kopanitsa ===
Kopanitsa is a form of Bulgarian folk music that utilizes certain forms of undecuple meter (typically 11/8). The terms are also used to describe the folk dances that are frequently performed alongside the music.Typically, kopanitsa's usage of undecuple meter will divide the measure into groupings of 2+2+3+2+2. This usage is referred to as a pattern of quick-quick-slow-quick-quick.

=== Gankino horo ===
Gankino horo (Bulgarian: Ганкино хоро, lit. 'Ganka's dance') is a Bulgarian folk dance written in undecuple meter (either 11/8 or 11/16) similar to kopanitsa or krivo horo. The name gankino appears to be most used in northern Bulgaria. The basic gankino horo is a three-measure dance using the step structure also common in the dances: dunavsko (danubian pravo), povarnoto (also known as devetorka in North Macedonia) and eleno mome.

The three measures comprise a seven-step grapevine. The accompanying dance starts with the right foot to the right, and the left foot crosses in front, taking two measures. The third measure is a three-step grapevine to the left, with the left foot stepping left, the right foot crossing in the back, and the left foot stepping left again.

== Usage in classical music ==
=== 17th century ===
A rare example of undecuple meter in the 17th century is found in Claude Le Jeune's "Cygne je suis de candeur", notated in 11/4. Another example (also in 11/4) is found in the John Bull piece In Nomine IX in the Fitzwilliam Virginal Book.

=== 19th century ===
In his analysis of the rhythms found within the music of Ravel, French philosopher and musicologist Vladimir Jankélévitch notes in a surprised manner that Rimsky-Korsakov uses the 11/4 time signature in the final song of his opera The Snow Maiden, as well as the first song in his opera Sadko. In the former piece—"Hymn to Yarilo"—the composer innovated by composing in a way that contrasted the meter's complex, unbalanced feeling with major chords and a majestic Allegro maestoso tempo.

Excerpt from Rimsky-Korsakov's "Hymn to Yarilo", demonstrating the usage of 11/4

=== 20th century ===
Jean Cras's 1927 composition Suite en duo for flute and harp (or flute and piano) ends with an animated dance section in an 11/8 time signature.

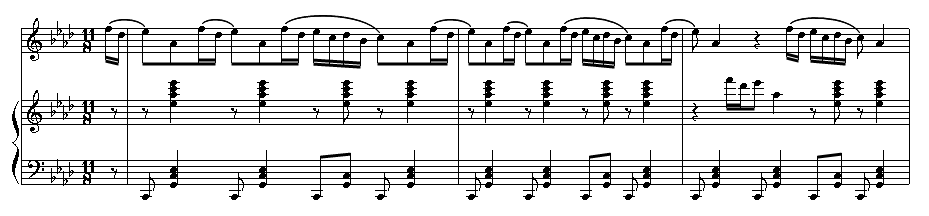
Excerpt from Cras's Suite en duo

== Characteristics ==
=== Structure ===
As a complex time signature, undecuple time is frequently subdivided into smaller groupings of two and three beats. In his book A Funky Thesaurus for the Rock Drummer, Charles Dowd notes that the time signature offers more combinations of groupings than smaller complex time signatures. Undecuple time can be subdivided into nine unique groupings of two and three beats.

Example subdivisions demonstrated in Dowd's work include groupings such as 2+2+2+3+2, 2+2+3+2+2, and 2+3+2+2+2.

=== Difficulty ===
Due to its inherent uneven feeling, undecuple time can be a difficult meter to perform and conduct in. Conductor Nicolas Slonimsky once wrote in his autobiography Perfect Pitch: "I was used to compound measures like the one to 11/4, in Rimski-Korsakov's opera, Sadko, which was an awkward obstacle for the choirs, and sometimes for the conductor. In fact, the students of the Conservatory had developed a little tune on eleven syllables to practice this section of the score, with very unrespectful lyrics towards the great master of Russian music, Rimsky-Korsakov is completely insane."

== List of compositions wholly or partially in undecuple meter ==
11/4

- "Awaken" by Yes (first section only)
- Concertino by Igor Stravinsky (before rehearsal mark 15)
- Concerto in E-flat by Igor Stravinsky (before rehearsal mark 25)
- "Eleven Four" written by Paul Desmond and recorded by the Dave Brubeck Quartet
- The intro of "Whipping Post" by the Allman Brothers Band

11/8

- The verse section of "Blockhead" by Devo
- "The Eleven" (1969) by the Grateful Dead
- "Eleven" by Primus
- "Here Comes the Sun" by The Beatles (during the bridge section)
- The race results screen from Mario Kart 64
- "Skrting on the Surface" by the Smile

== See also ==
- Aksak
- Bulgarian folk dance
