= Viltis =

Viltis (Lithuanian for hope) might refer to:

- Viltis (magazine), an English-language magazine on folk dancing and culture published in Denver, Colorado
- Viltis (newspaper), a Lithuanian-language newspaper published in Vilnius in 1907–1915 and 1991–1994
- Viltis Elektrėnai, an ice hockey team in Lithuania
