= List of folk percussion instruments =

This is a list of folk percussion instruments.

A percussion instrument is a musical instrument that is sounded by being struck or scraped by a beater including attached or enclosed beaters or rattles struck, scraped or rubbed by hand or struck against another similar instrument. A folk percussion instrument has a significant history or purpose within a geographic region or culture.

== List ==
- Berimbau
- bodhrán
- Bombo legüero
- Cajon
- Dhol
- Dholak
- Djembe
- Dunun
- Gamelan
- Kpanlogo
- Lagerphone
- Latin percussion
- Marimbula
- Pogo cello
- Steelpan
- hank drum
- Thavil
- Urumee
- Udukai
- Mridangam
- Taiko
- Timbal
- Tonbak
- Washboard
