= Ashkenaz (disambiguation) =

Ashkenaz (Hebrew: אשכנז) may refer to:

- Germany, in a medieval Jewish context
  - A member (or descent) of the Yiddish-speaking Ashkenazi Jewish community, a branch of European Jewry formed in Medieval Germany
  - Nusach Ashkenaz, a style of Jewish religious service conducted by Ashkenazi Jews
  - Chassidei Ashkenaz, a Jewish movement in the 12th century and 13th century
- Ashkenaz, Gomer's first son in the Bible
- Ashkenaz Foundation, in the Canadian city of Toronto, Ontario
- Ashkenaz (music venue), a music and dance center in the U.S. city of Berkeley, California

== See also ==
- Ashkenazi (surname)
