= Rain on the Roof (disambiguation) =

Rain on the Roof may refer to:

- Rain on the Roof, a 1980 television drama by Dennis Potter
- Rain on the Roof (album), a 1996 album by Andy Irvine
- Rain on the Roof (song), a 1966 single by the Lovin' Spoonful
