= Petrunino horo =

Petrunino horo is a Bulgarian dance from the Shopluk region in middle-west Bulgaria.

== Overview ==
The tunes that Petrunino horo is danced to are commonly found in compilations of Bulgarian dance music. The dance is part of the repertoire of nearly every professional Bulgarian folk troupe. The Petrunino horo is one of the two main examples of Bulgarian dances in 12/16 meter.

== Meter ==
Petrunino horo is commonly played and danced in a 12/16 meter. The meter is similar to that of the Eleno Mome tune in that the major groupings are counted as slow, slow, quick, medium. The main difference between Petrunino horo and Eleno Mome is that in Petrunino horo, the second slow is divided into two, yielding a slow, quick, quick, quick, medium. This rhythm is used in almost every measure of most versions of the dance.

== Folk dance teachers ==
Teachers of Petrunino horo include David Vinski, Dick Crum, Jaap Leegwater, and Daniela Ivanova-Nyberg.
