= Kopanitsa =

Kopanitsa or kopanica (called in some regions Gankino) is the name for a family of lively folk dances from western Bulgaria done to music in 11/8 meter, and also sometimes for the accompanying music. Some sources describe the rhythm in terms of "quick" and "slow" beats, the pattern being quick-quick-slow-quick-quick (counted as 2-2-3-2-2 metric beats). The name comes from the verb kopam, which means "to dig" or "to hoe", so the name is sometimes translated as "little digging dance". As with other Balkan dances, different regions and even different villages have their own variations of the dance.

== Description ==
Kopanitsas and gankinos are line dances done with dancers in a curved line facing in, either holding hands with arms down or (in kopanitsas) holding the belts of the neighboring dancers. Many of them are "called" dances, with several patterns of steps. Dancers repeat one pattern until the leader on the right end of the line calls another pattern.

The term kopanitsa seems to be especially used in the Shopluk region of western Bulgaria, which includes the towns of Sofia, Pernik, Radomir and Kyustendil. Some common names are Shopska kopanitsa, Graovska kopanitsa, and Divotinka kopanitsa (from the village of Divotino). There is even a village named Kopanitsa not far from the town of Pernik.

The term kopanitsa is also found in western Thrace and the Sredna Gora regions east of Sofia (Ihtiman, Panagyurishte, Pazardzhik) and even as far east as Plovdiv. The term gankino (Ganka's dance) seems to be used mostly in northern Bulgaria (particularly in the western and central parts) and also refers to dances in 11/16. In western Thrace, dances in 11/16 meter are often called Krivo (or Krivata), a term which means "crooked" or "uneven".

Dances in 11/16 similar to kopanitsa or gankino can also be found in North Macedonia (Sedenka, Pletenica, Skopsko, etc.) and Serbia (Kopačka) using other names. The Serbian Kopačka, in 11/16, is not the same as the Macedonian Kopačka, which is in 2/4.

== Basic Gankino step ==
As an example of the form, the basic gankino is the most widespread of the dances in the group, and is done by international folk dance groups as "kopanitsa". The step is three measures, consisting of two grapevine steps to the right and one to the left:

Measure 1: 1.(quick) Step right on right foot, 2.(quick) Step behind right on left foot, 3.(slow) Step right on right foot, 4.(quick) Step left in front of right on left foot, 5.(quick) Pause;

Measure 2: 1.(quick) Step right on right foot, 2.(quick) Step behind right on left foot, 3.(slow) Step right on right foot, 4.(quick) Close left foot next to right, 5.(quick) pause;

Measure 3: 1.(quick) Step left on left foot, 2.(quick) Step behind left on right foot, 3.(slow) Step right on right foot, 4.(quick) Close right foot next to left, 5.(quick) pause;

Individual dancers are free to improvise variations to the basic step, mostly during the fourth and fifth beats of measures 2 and 3, for example replacing the pause with a foot slap (plesni) or a jump apart and then jump together (hlopchi). The musicians often speed up the music during the dance as a challenge to the dancers.

== Musical influence ==
The music accompanying the kopanitsa has spread beyond its original homeland; kopanitsas having been recorded by Irish musician Andy Irvine and Davy Spillane on their 1992 album EastWind and on the 2004 album Live from the Powerhouse by Mozaik.
