= Athan Karras =

American actor (1927–2010

- Born: September 27, 1927; Thessaloniki, Greece
- Died: February 12, 2010 (aged 82); Tarzana, California, United States
- Career
- Former groups: Greek National Theater; Parthenon Dancers
- Dances: Greek

Athan Karras (September 27, 1927 – February 12, 2010) was a Greek-born American dancer, instructor and actor.

== Early life ==
Karras was born in Thessaloniki, Greece. He came to the United States when he was about 12. He served in the United States Coast Guard. After serving in the Coast Guard, he finished high school and studied theater and dance at New York University. He eventually joined the National Theater of Greece and the Parthenon Dancers, one of the premier Greek Folk Dance troops.

== Career ==
In the early 1960s, he founded the Intersection Folk Dance Center in Los Angeles.

For 25 years, Karras taught Greek culture and dance at Loyola Marymount University. He was the U.S. coordinator for Mazoxi, an annual Greek dance conference held on Crete. He also appeared in about 20 films and television projects, staged a number of Greek-language plays in Los Angeles and produced folklore programs and events throughout North America.

== Death ==
Karras died on February 12, 2010, at Providence Tarzana Medical Center in Tarzana, California, of complications from coronary artery bypass surgery.

== See also ==
- International folk dance

== Sources ==
- "Athan Karras". Phantom Ranch.
- "Athan Karras". Hellenic Communication Service.
- "Dance pioneer was 'Zorba the Greek come to life'". Los Angeles Daily News.
