= Daychovo horo =

Bulgarian folk dance

Dajchovo horo (Bulgarian: Дайчово хоро) is a Bulgarian folk dance done to a nine-beat meter. It is unique in two ways: it is a circle dance (most Bulgarian dances are either line or couple dances), and yet it has a leader (most circle dances have no leader).

== Dance steps ==
The dance has a basic step pattern consisting of a lift of the right knee on the first beat, followed by three steps in place. This pattern is repeated, alternating which knee is lifted. Each pattern is done in a single measure of 9 beats (9/8) with a pattern counted 2+2+2+3 or "quick-quick-quick-slow". A leader in the circle can then call out variations to be performed, starting on the first beat of a pattern (when the right knee would be lifted). This is done as a banter between the leader and the rest of the circle. Following the banter, the entire circle performs the variation, and then resumes the basic dance step.

The banter and most variations take up four measures of the music. This means that the leader can choose to call a new variation during the execution of the current variation; if this occurs, the dancers execute the next variation without resuming the basic step.

A sample variation consists of:

- Leader says "Chukni nane" (let's stamp)
- Dancers reply: "Chukum, chukum" (stamp, stamp)
- Leader says: "Hajdi nane" (when shall we do it?)
- Dancers reply: "Asigadeh" (do it now)
- All dancers then perform the variation, which in this case consists of three rapid stamps with the right foot and a pause followed by a basic step lifting the right knee; the pattern is then repeated stamping with the left feet and a basic step lifting the left knee. These stamps are then repeated.

Each variation has its own name, and it is not uncommon for new variations to be developed within a given group. Other variations include:

- Nina nane (ninum, ninum)
  - two stamps on the even beats (lift, stamp, lift, stamp) with the right foot while standing on the left.
  - A basic pattern, raising the right knee.
  - The above two parts repeated with the other foot
- Shetni nane (shetnum, shetnum)
  - Moving to the left with a paiduško-type movement: the right foot crosses in front of the left foot, weight transferred to the right foot while the left foot moves to the left. The preceding step takes one measure and is done three times
  - Basic step pattern lifting the right knee
  - Repeat above two steps in the opposite direction
- Lula nane (Lulum, lulum)
  - Basic step pattern moving in a wedge-shaped pattern: diagonally in to the right, rotate counterclockwise in place, diagonally out from the center, clockwise (left) towards the starting point. (The dancers don't end up where they started.)
- Ziza nane (Zizum, zizum)
  - Three scissor steps, ending with the left foot touching the ground with the knee extended
  - Same as above with the opposite foot extended
  - The above two steps repeated

This kind of aksak metre is prominently featured in the Dave Brubeck number ¨Blue Rondo a la turk¨

== See also ==
- Bulgarian folk dances
