= Dick Crum =

Folk dance teacher

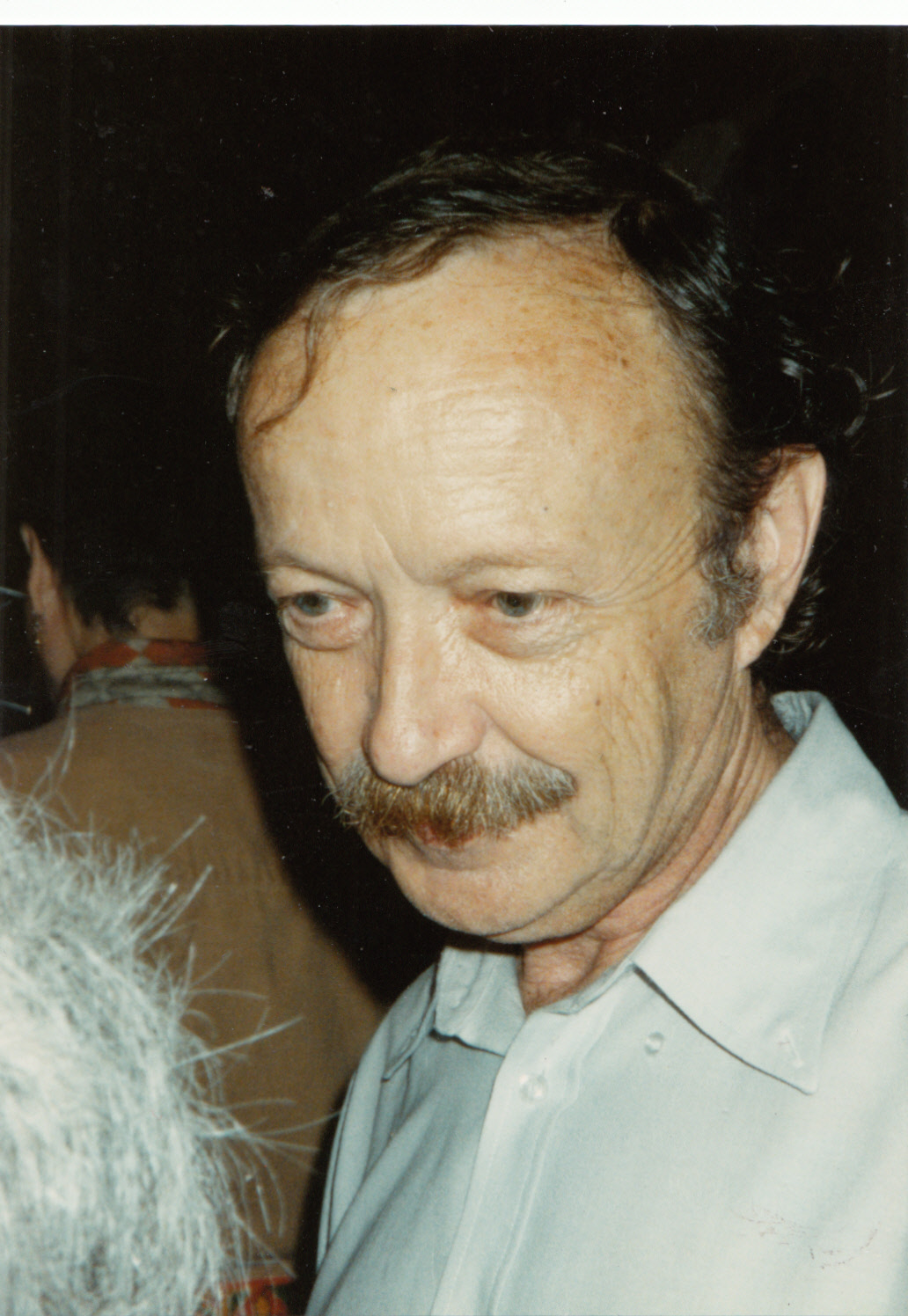
Dick Crum, 1989

Richard George Crum (December 8, 1928 – December 12, 2005) was a prominent international folk dance researcher, teacher and choreographer. He conducted extensive field research in Eastern Europe in the 1950s (Shay, p, 121) and was choreographer for the Duquesne University Tamburitzans. He ran several international folk dance festivals, including those at St. Paul, Minnesota and Pittsburgh, Pennsylvania.

== Early life ==
Dick Crum was born to German and Irish parents, the oldest of five children, and grew up in St. Paul, Minnesota. He attended a Romanian school and took a great interest in that culture. His mother, Florence "Fee Fee" Crum, taught some folk dancing, and Dick and his sister Lois attended the Serbian Days festival in Hibbing and Chisholm, Minnesota and the St. Louis, Missouri Folk Dance Festival.

He attended the University of Pittsburgh to receive a bachelor's degree in Romance Languages, and Harvard University to receive a Master's in Slavic Languages and Literature.

== International folk dancing ==
Crum was a dancer, technical adviser, and choreographer with the Duquesne University Tamburitzans starting in 1950. He was named program director of the Festival of Nations at St. Paul, Minnesota, in 1952. He also consulted and choreographed for the AMAN Folk Ensemble.

In the early 1950s, his popularity as an international folk dance teacher increased rapidly. He did research on folk dances in the Balkans, visiting there seven times. He taught not only dances from the Balkans, but also Slovenian couple dances and other European dances.

In 1996, Crum was a panelist at a conference for the National Endowment for the Arts entitled "Vernacular Dance in America".

In addition to his avid interest in international folk dancing, Crum had a proclivity for languages and learned many, including Bulgarian, Macedonian, Serbo-Croatian, Slovene, French, Spanish, and Romanian. He also knew some Chinese, German, Hungarian, Indonesian, Italian, Polish, Portuguese, Russian, Swedish, and Old Church Slavonic. Crum worked as a multilingual editor for Agnew Tech-Tran and later Berlitz GlobalNet, both translation services, in Los Angeles, California.

== See also ==
International folk dance

== Source books ==
- Casey, Betty (1981). International Folk Dancing U. S. A. Doubleday. ISBN 9781574411188.
- Laušević, Mirjana (2007). Balkan Fascination: Creating an Alternative Music Culture in America. Oxford University Press. pp. 190–194, et al. ISBN 978-0190269425.
- Shay, Anthony (2006). Choreographing Identities: Folk Dance, Ethnicity and Festival in the United States and Canada. Jefferson, North Carolina: McFarland & Co. pp. ix, 12, 19, 39, 97, 121, 162. ISBN 978-0786426003.
