= Vytautas Beliajus =

Dancer, folk dance instructor, and choreographer (1908–1994)

Vytautas Finadar "Vyts" Beliajus (26 February 1908 – 20 September 1994) was a dancer, folk dance instructor, and choreographer, and is considered the father of international folk dancing in the United States.

He specialized in Lithuanian dance, but performed and taught many other types of dance as well. He published multiple books on the subjects of dance and ethnicity, and also started the folklore magazine Viltis.

== Career ==
Vytautas Beliajus was born in Pakumprys, Prienai District Municipality in Kaunas County, then part of the Russian Empire. He learned to dance Russian and German dances at a young age. War temporarily forced him to flee his hometown until they were sent back by German troops. He emigrated to the U.S. when he was 14 years old, along with his grandmother, and settled in Chicago. He had two younger brothers, Leonas and Julius, and a sister, Gyte Jekentes. For a time, he worked at an embroidery company, a fur ship, and an automotive mail order establishment.

After reading Around the World in 80 Days by Jules Verne, he took an interest in Asia and the Middle East and learned their dances from local Hindu and Arab people. In 1928, he danced at an anniversary concert for the Lithuanian newspaper Naujienos with his partner, Irene Juozaitus, presenting Asian and Lithuanian dances. In 1929, he opened a dance studio in Chicago. He also choreographs for Lithuanian groups and choirs.

In 1933, Beliajus was chosen to create a Lithuanian presentation for the World's Fair in Chicago. He was also chosen to teach folk dancing as a part of the Chicago Park District Recreational Activities Council. He was hired to teach folk dancing as part of the International House of the University of Chicago in 1937. In 1939, he published a newsletter called "Folk Lore" for the Park District, and temporarily opened a dance house called "Folk Dancer's Nook".

In 1943, Beliajus moved to Fairhope, Alabama, and introduced international folk dancing to the School of Organic Education, and also held an international folk dance festival. He contracted tuberculosis, which caused him to lose his voice. In 1945, he moved back to Chicago, and took a job teaching at the International House. In 1949, He was invited to teach in Stockton Folk Dance Camp. He taught for a couple of years before catching tuberculosis again, and after a hospital stay, he moved to San Diego to recover.

In 1959, he moved to Denver, and it was discovered that he had a tumor in his right lung. Part of his lung had to be removed.

In 1986, he founded the National Folk Organization with Mary Bee Jensen, George Frandsen, and L. DeWayne Young.

For his contributions to dance education, he was honored in 1972 by the National Dance Association with the Heritage Award.

== Sources ==
- Vyts Beliajus biography
- Vyts and the English language

== See also ==
- List of dancers
