= Kpanlogo =

Ghanaian dance for the Ga-Dangme people

Kpanlogo is a recreational dance and music form originating from the 1960s among urban youth in Accra, Ghana. It developed from traditional music styles like Oge and Gome from the coastal Ga people.

== Origin ==
It was first played by the Ga ethnic group in the Greater Accra Region, most of whom live in and around the capital city, but is now performed and enjoyed throughout the country. It began in the early 1960s as an innovative dance form, influenced by American rock and roll, and giving the younger Ga generations a point of distinction from their elders. Ghanaian master drummer C. K. Ladzekpo states that kpanlogo "is essentially an urban youth dance-drumming and a symbol of the commitment of a rapidly growing Ghanaian urban neighborhood youth in advocating their perspective in shaping the political vision of post colonial Africa" (1995: web). The kpanlogo dance is often performed low to the ground, with bent knees and bent back, and frequently features sexually suggestive motions. Accounts of police seizing musical instruments and detaining performers in its early days have been documented.

The music accompanying the kpanlogo dance is drawn from older Ga drumming traditions, such as gome, oge and kolomashie. Kpanlogo music uses three types of instruments: nono (metal bell), fao (gourd rattle), and kpanlogo drums. Nono plays the key pattern or timeline of the music, supported by the fao. It is common to have three kpanlogo drums in an ensemble, in the roles of "male voice", "female voice" and "master drum".

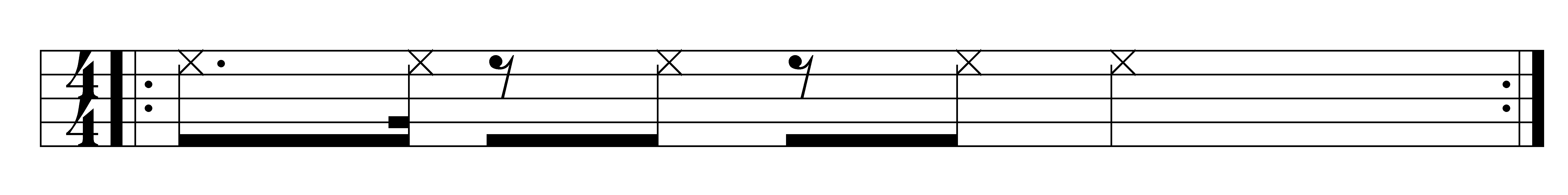
Main kpanlogo bell pattern

The main kpanlogo bell part is one of the most common and oldest key patterns found in sub-Saharan Africa. The bell pattern used in kpanlogo is the same as the son clave pattern heard in Cuban music and. It is also similar to the "Bo Diddley beat" popularized by the U.S. rhythm and blues musician Bo Diddley.

== Gallery ==
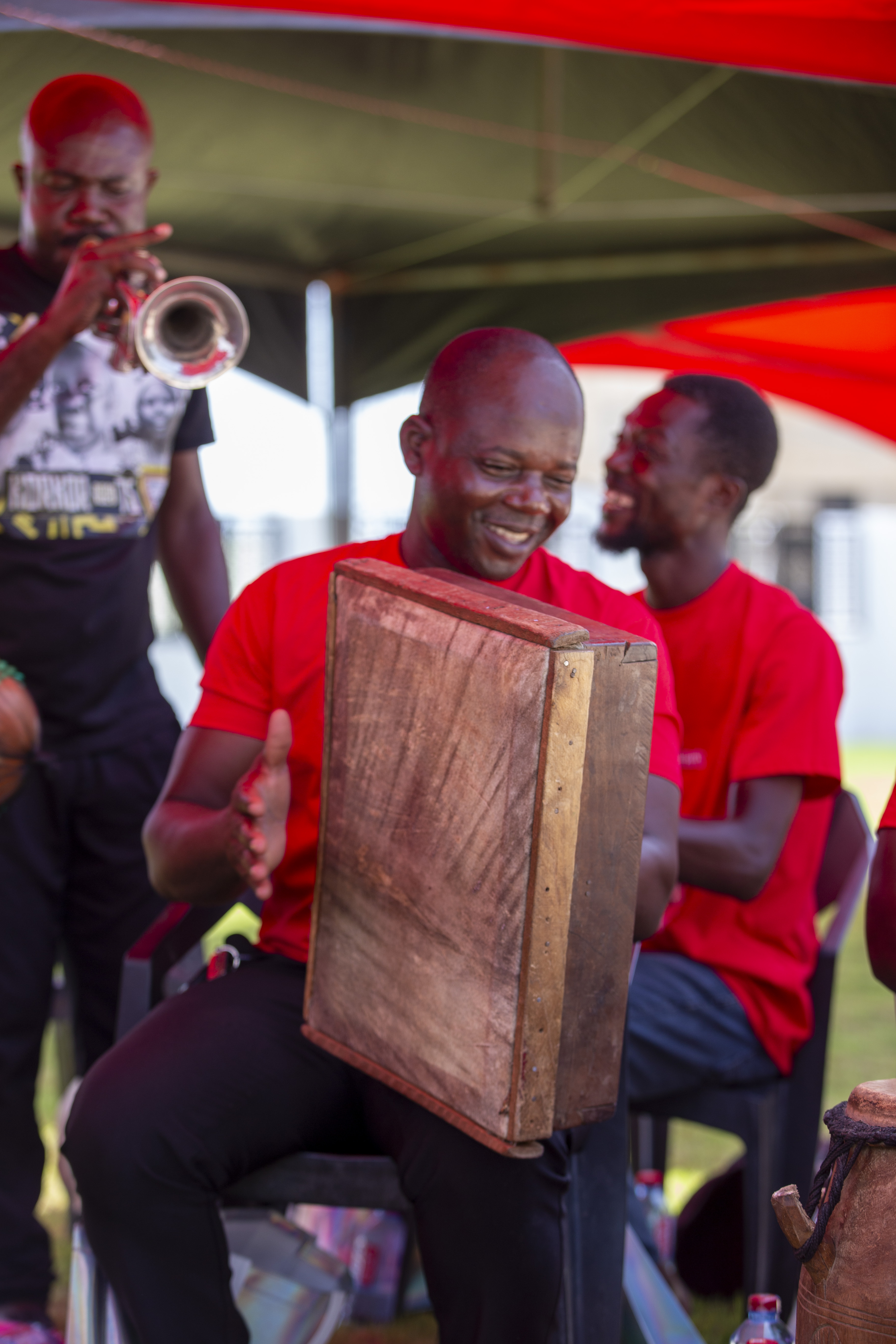
This is an image with the theme "Rites and Rituals"

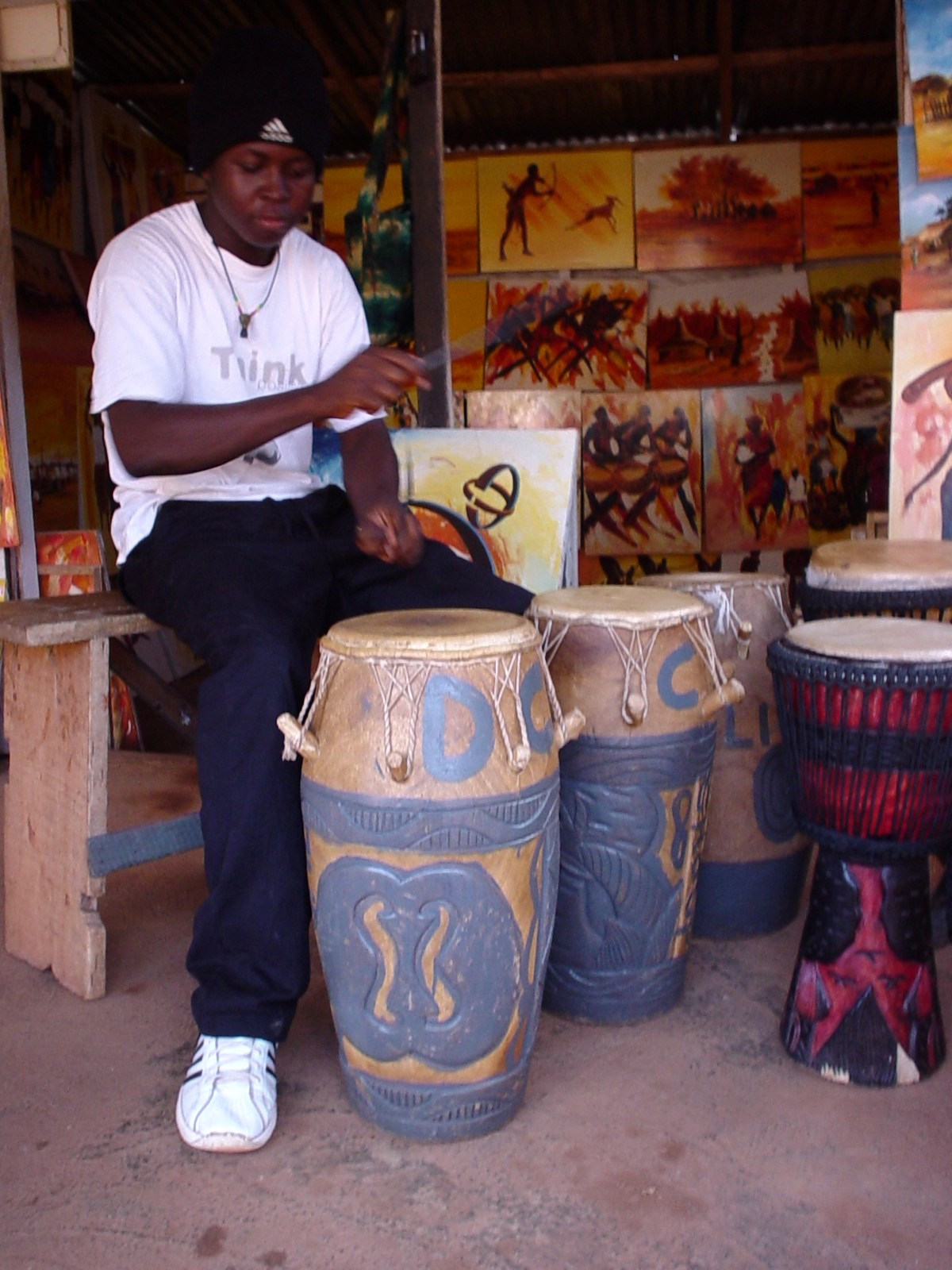
Drummer Daladi Eliyasu playing kpanlogo drums

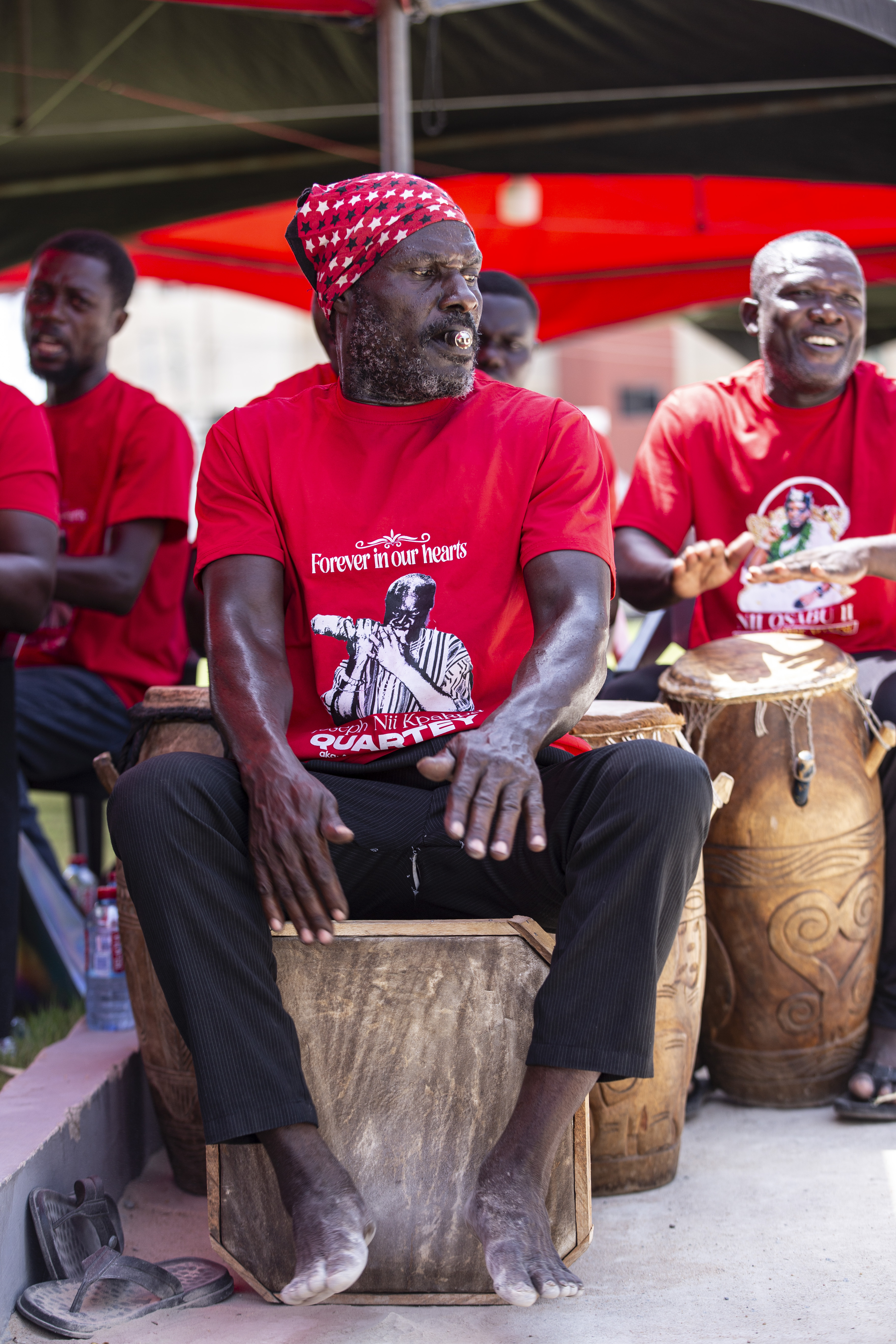
This is an image with the theme "Rites and Rituals"

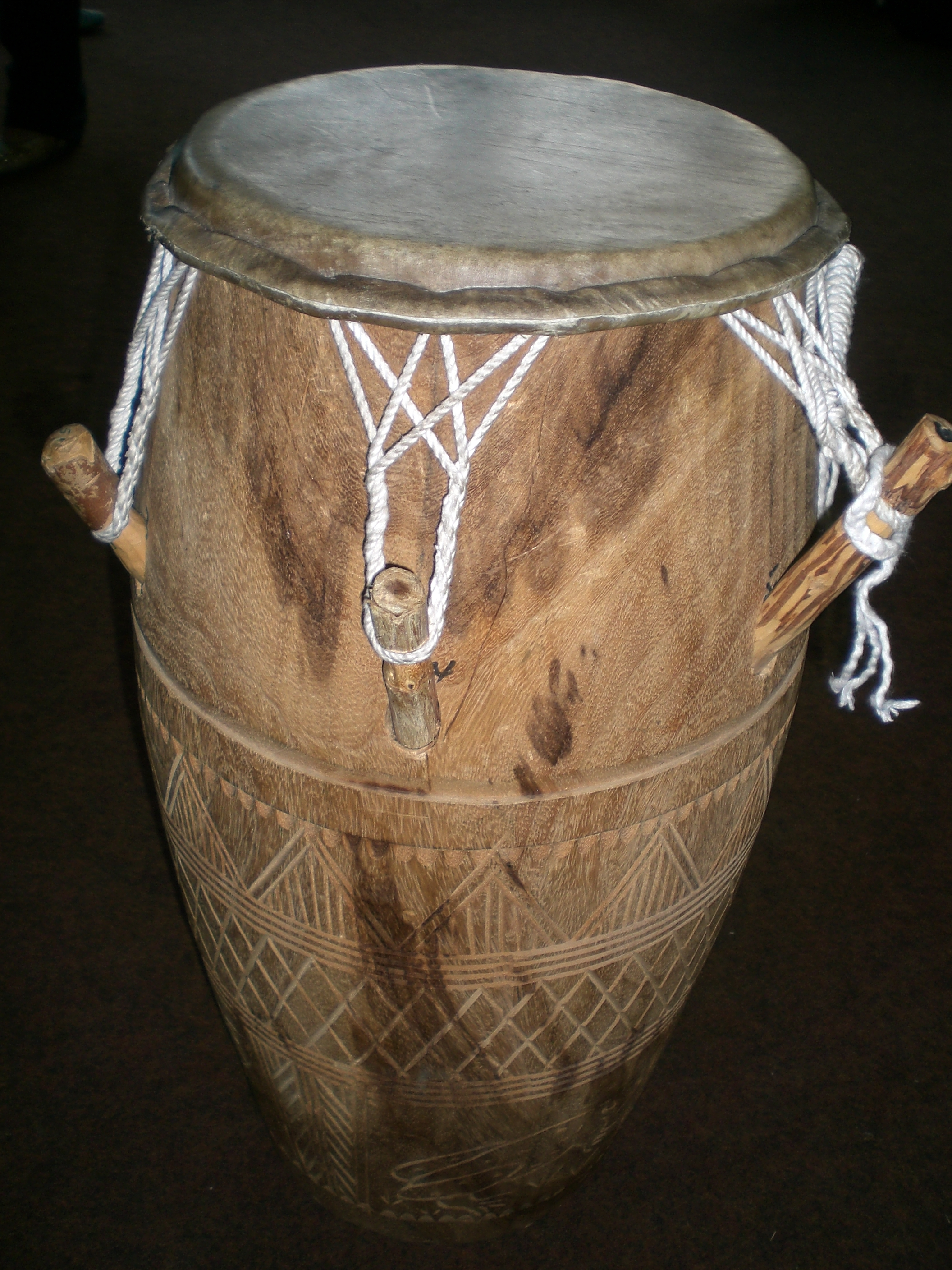
a Kpanlogo

== Audio ==
Kpanlogo-Rhythmus mit Solostimme

Der ghanaische Rhythmus Kpanlogo, bestehend aus folgenden Einzelstimmen: Kpanlogo 1 und 2, Glocke, Rassel, Klatschen

Pronunciation of Kpanlogo

== Sources ==
- Unruh, Amee Jo (2000). "Kpanlogo: A Detailed Description of One Arrangement of a West-African Music and Dance Genre." M.M. thesis with videotape. Bowling Green, Ohio: Bowling Green State University.
