= Bulgarian folk dance =

Ethnic folk dance tradition

Bulgarian folk dances are intimately related to the music of Bulgaria. This distinctive feature of Balkan folk music is the asymmetrical meter, built up around various combinations of 'quick' and 'slow' beats. The music, in Western musical notation, is often described using compound meter notation, where the notational meter accents, i.e., the heard beats, can be of different lengths, usually 1, 2, 3, or 4. Many Bulgarian dances are line dances, in which the dancers dance in a straight or curved line, holding hands.

== Overview ==
Many Bulgarian dances are line dances, with the dancers holding hands in a straight or curved line, facing in toward the center of the dance space. Originally men and women danced in separate lines, or in a gender-segregated line in which the last woman and first man held opposite ends of a handkerchief, to avoid gender contact but today men and women often dance in mixed lines. Several different handholds are used in the different dances:

- Holding hands down at waist level, the arms of adjacent dancers in the shape of a "V", right hand facing forward, left hand facing back
- Holding hands at shoulder level, with the arms of adjacent dancers in the shape of a "W", right hand palm up, left hand palm down
- "Teacup hold", in which each dancer places his left hand on his stomach making a "handle" with his left arm, and loops his right hand loosely through the arm of the right-hand dancer
- Shoulder hold, with the arms held out straight horizontally to the sides, the hands resting on the near shoulders of the adjacent dancers. This was originally a men's hold, used only in the men's line.
- Belt hold (na lesa), with each dancer holding the front of the belt or sash of the two adjacent dancers, left arm over right

Bulgarian dances are distinctive for their subtle rhythms and intricate footwork. In some dances, the dancers repeat the same pattern of steps throughout the dance, while others are "called" dances with several different steps in which the leader calls out changes in the steps at his discretion. Still, others have a basic step which individual dancers may embellish at specific points with variations like stamps and foot slaps.

In dances in which the line moves to the right or left, the dancer at the head of the line is the "leader". It is his responsibility to lead the line so it doesn't collide with other lines, and in "called" dances to call the variations. New dancers joining a dancing line join at the end; it is bad manners to join at the head of the line, in front of the leader.

== Regional differences ==
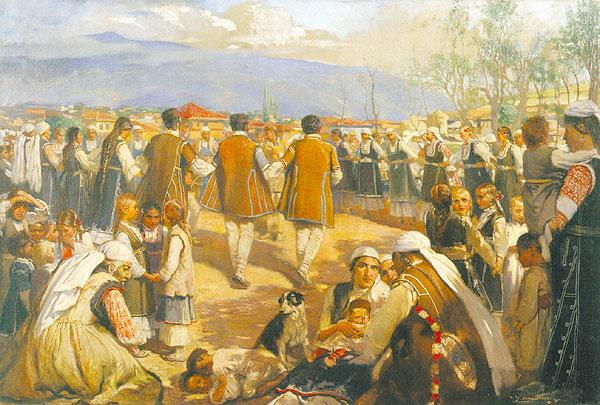
A Shopluk horo

Bulgaria is divided into seven ethnographic regions: Northern Bulgaria, Dobruja, Shopluk, Thrace, Strandzha, Macedonia and the Rhodopes. Each region has its own distinctive style of dance, to the extent that a knowledgeable observer can often tell which region a group of Bulgarians comes from by how they perform a popular dance like the pravo. In addition, due to the intricate ethnic mix in the Balkans, each locality and even each village may have its own variation of a dance, different enough that it amounts to a distinct dance. In Bulgarian folk dance literature, local variations are often differentiated by adding the geographical origin to the dance name: for example pravo plovdivsko horo means "the pravo dance from the town of Plovdiv".

== Rhythm and meter ==
The proportions of the beats do not follow any exact rational proportions. For example, the well-known tune "Eleno Mome" (Елено Моме) exists written in three forms: (1) 7 = 2+2+1+2, (2) 13 = 4+4+2+3, and (3) 12 = 3+4+2+3 times. Here, the latter two forms exist both as a musicologist's way to attempt to indicate the tendency of speeding up the last and first beats, as well as in the formal version, where the musician plays 3 or 4 about equal length notes on the beat. In music band playing, the meter 7 = 2+2+1+2 seems favored, thus skipping some of the time-bending subtleties. Given this fact, though, some meters are more common or popular, but there is a wide variation of less frequent combinations, as well.

There is also disagreement about whether one should use 1/8 or 1/16 as meter denominator, but this is just a notational convenience. In the list below, the denominator follows in part notational practice of the region, and in part the speed of the type of tune, giving the 1/4 note a reasonable number of beats per minute (as on a metronome).

Folk dancers often speak in terms of "quick" and "slow" instead of a steady meter "1, 2, 3," etc. These dance rhythms may not agree with the rhythms and meters performed by the musicians. For example, the 11/16 rhythm of the dance kopanitsa is often described as quick-quick-slow-quick-quick, (2+2+3+2+2) whereas the tune may be played in what may be written as (2+2)+(2+1)+(2+2), i.e., an 11 time with primary accent at 1, secondary accents at 5 and 8, and tertiary accents at 3, 7, and 10. The dancers thus dance to a meter composition 4+3+2+2, which may also be played by the musicians, e.g., in Traichovo horo (Трайчово хоро).

In addition, some tunes may have considerable time bends, such as the Macedonian Žensko Beranče and Bajrače, though viewed as and written in 3+2+2+3+2. Therefore, in dance instruction, quick and slow beat descriptions, in combination with intuition and careful listening, may be a good approach, though not suitable for performing and notating the music. In addition, a dance instructor not familiar with the exact musical rhythms should not demonstrate these dance rhythms without music. It would be best to use a slowed-down playback, lest the dancers become confused at full speed.

== List of Bulgarian folk dances ==
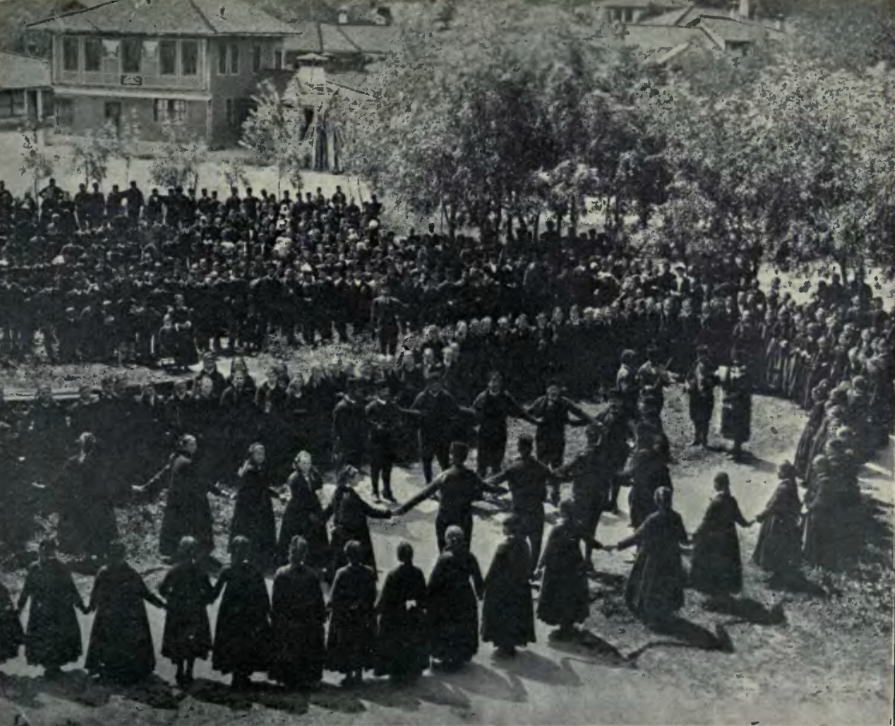
Bulgarian peasants dancing the horo c. 1906

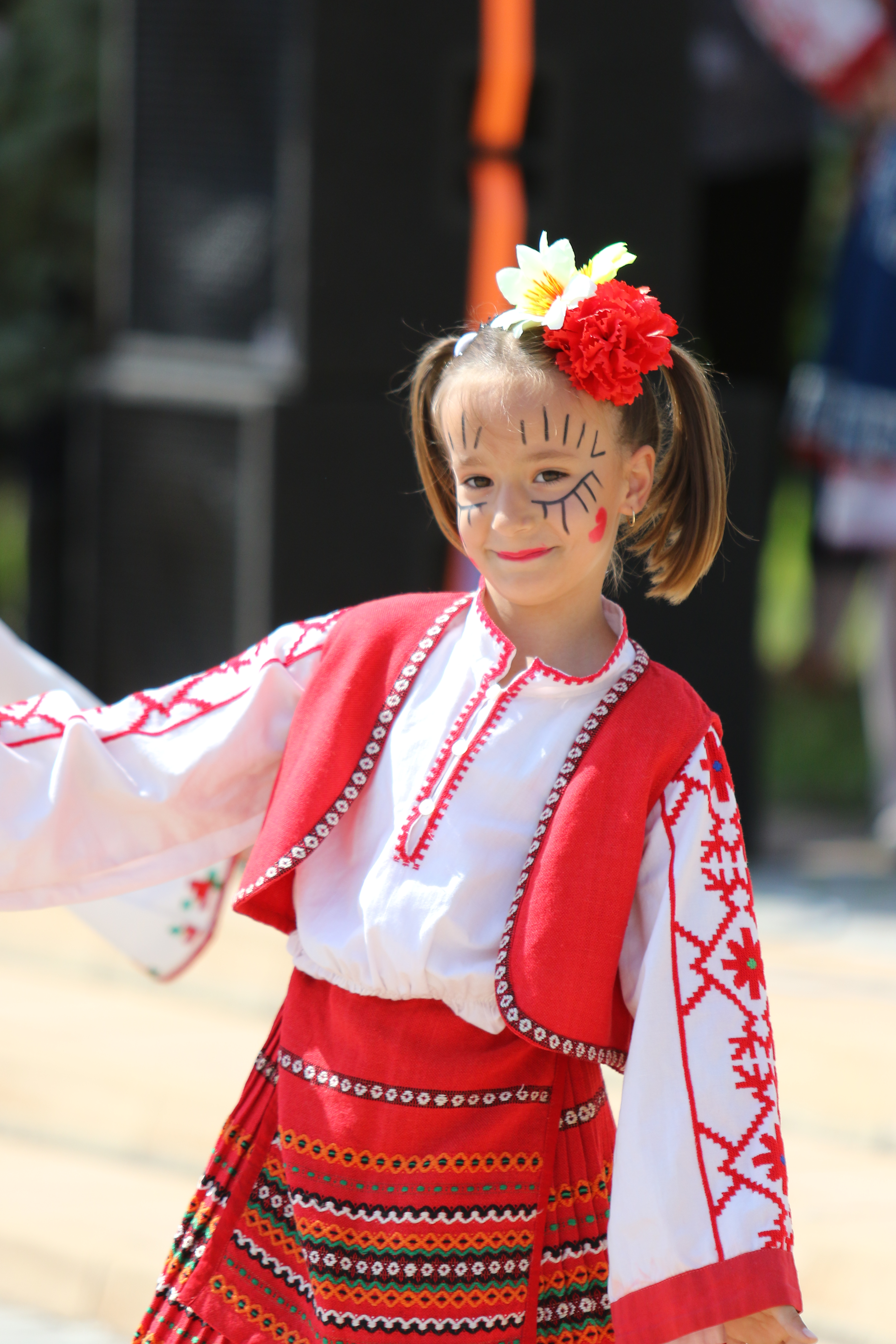
Children from Bulgaria perform folk dance

Below is a list of some Bulgarian folk dances, along with their commonly written rhythms and time signatures. The word horo means "dance" and is sometimes added to the name of the dance.

Since the transliteration of Bulgarian is problematic, the official Bulgarian transliteration is used, which can be checked at Transliteration of proper names in Bulgaria, followed within parenthesizes by the Bulgarian name and, after a semicolon, (for searchability) alternative transliterations. Following a Bulgarian sheet music practice, more complex meters generally appear later in the list.

- Trite pati (Трите пъти; Trite puti, Trite pŭti) in 2/4: Line dance with rapid feet movement; step rhythm quick-quick-slow = 1+1+2.
- Tropanka (Тропанка) in 2/4: Stampy Dobrudzha men's dance, V handhold, with swinging and pumping arm motions.
- Opas (Опас) in 2/4: A varied dance often done with hands across the chest of the person next to you with the next in line.
- Pravo horo (Право хоро) in 2/4 or 6/8, counted as 3+3: Often in music for the Pravo, both 2/4 and 6/8 time signatures will be used where 2/4 is used for the singing and 6/8 is used for the slightly faster instrumental portions. In Bulgaria, the 6/8 portion is also transcribed in 2/4 using triplets.
  Pravo is characterised by left-over-right arms "belt-hold" (in lieu of hand hold), a beginning right foot diving step toward the center of from one to many concentric broken circles, traveling ultimately counterclockwise. Each dance phrase corresponds to 3 musical measures counted as quick quick slow slow (corresponding to 2+2+4+4 in 2/4 time or 3+3+6+6 in 6/8 time).
- Shopsko horo (Шопско хоро; Shopluk horo, Shop dance) in 2/4: Men's dance often accompanied with bagpipes (gaida) and drum (tŭpan).
- Paydushko horo (Пайдушко хоро; Paidushko horo, Pajduško horo, Pajduška horo, Payduska horo, Baiduska horo) in 5/16 or 5/8 (2+3): Often characterized as a "limping dance", this dance typically involves two footwork patterns, a "step hop" and a "step step". In the southern parts of Bulgaria, North Macedonia and Greece, the quick-slow pattern is sometimes reversed into a slow-quick pattern (3+2).
- Chetvorno horo (Четворно хоро; Četvorno horo) in 7/16 (3+2+2 or 3+4)
- Rachenitsa (Ръченица; Rŭchenitsa, Râčenica) in 7/16 (2+2+3 or 4+3): Single or couple dance.
- Lesnoto (Лесното хоро) in 7/8 (3+2+2): A slow line dance with steps resembling the pravo horo.
- Ginka (Гинка) in 7/8 (3+2+2): A slow line dance from the Pirin Mountains.
- Svornato horo (Сворнато хоро) in 9/8 (2+2+2+3): From the Pirin Mountains, a four-phrase line dance.
- Varnensko horo (Варненско хоро) in 9/8 (2+2+2+3): A line dance with slow graceful steps.
- Elenino horo (Еленино хоро), Eleno Mome (Елено Моме) in 2+2+1+2/8, 4+4+2+3/16, or 3+4+2+3/16: A line dance. Smithsonian recording, performed metric beat proportions about 4+4+2+3.
- Petrunino horo (Петрунино хоро) in 2+2+1+2/8, 4+4+2+3/16, or 3+4+2+3/16.
- Daychovo horo (Дайчово хоро; Daichovo horo, Dajčovo horo) in 9/16 (4+2+3 or 2+2+2+3): A circle dance where a leader calls what formations/variations the circle should do next.
- Grancharsko horo (Грънчарско хоро; Gryncharsko horo, Gruncarsko horo) in 9/16 (2+3+2+2).
- Gankino horo (Ганкино хоро), Kopanitsa (Копаница; Kopanica) in 11/16 (4+3+4 or 2+2+3+2+2): Line dances.
- Acano mlada nevesto in 11/8 (3+2+2+2+2 or 3+4+2+2): A Macedonian song, line dance.
- Krivo plovdivsko horo (Криво пловдивско хоро) in 13/16 (2+2+2+3+2+2): listen.
- Ispaychi (Испайчи, Испайче; Ispayche, Ispajče) in 13/16 (8+5 or 3+2+3+2+3).
- Elbasansko horo (Елбасанско хоро) in 14/16 (9+5 or 2+2+2+3+2+3).
- Buchimish (Бучимиш; Bučimiš) in 15/16 (2+2+2+2+3+2+2): A line dance.
- Yove male mome (Йове мале моме; Jove male mome, Jove malaj mome), Povela e Yova (Повела е Йова) in 18/16 (7+11)
- Sandansko horo (Санданско хоро) in 22/16 (2+2+2+3+2+2+2+3+2+2)
- Sedi Donka (Седи Донка), Plovdivsko horo (Пловдивско хоро) in 25/16 (7+7+11/16 divided as 3+2+2/16 + 3+2+2/16 + 2+2+3+2+2/16): Done with left-over-right belt-hold in a straight line, moving forward (like a military phalanx) performing intricate steps selected by the leader, then repeated in reverse or mirror order while backing up, then stopping and going forward again with the same or even a different choice by the leader, who could be on one end or even in the middle of the phalanx. Suitable for a performance with 6 to 10 dancers on a stage or an exhibition area.
- Dunavsko horo (Дунавско хоро): dance from the Danube region in northern Bulgaria.

== Details on Bulgarian dances ==
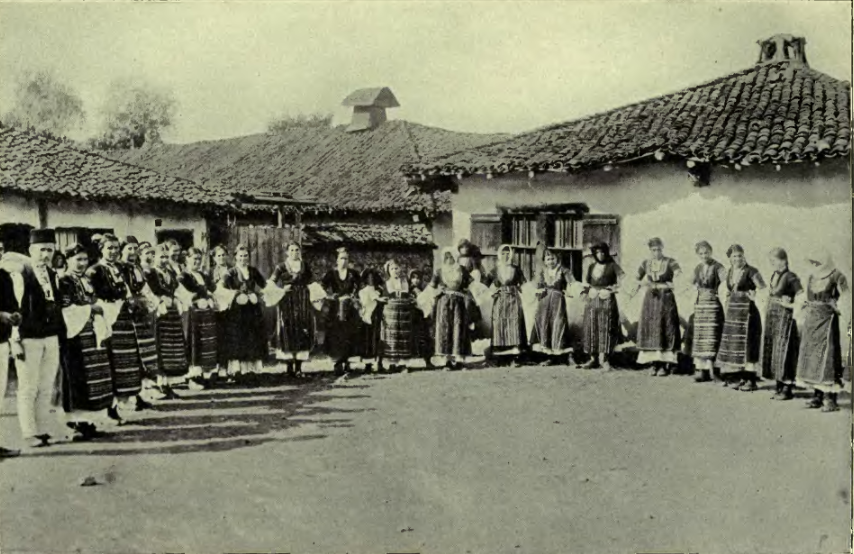
Bulgarian peasants ready to dance the horo, c 1913

Yove male mome and sedi donka can be thought of as a compound of common 7 (chetvorno) and 11 (kopanitsa) meters, but it is more unclear what sandansko horo should be: possibilities are a compound 9+13, where 9 is the daychovo meter, and 13 the Krivo plovdivsko horo meter, or 9+9+4, where 9 is the daychovo meter.

A ruchenitsa can, in slower tempo, have a distinctive 2+2+3 rhythm, but in a quicker pace, it may only be perceived as a 4+3. Thus, even though these are well-known rhythmic patterns, one may not arrive at an unambiguous meter interpretation, the way listeners of Western music are used to.

Many of the dances are formed by each person holding the belt or sash of the dancer on either side. These belts are typically fit loosely around the waist so that each person can move easily within the belt, while the overall line can stay together. Although there are basic steps that make up the dance, certain people may improvise variations, sometimes forming a competition between the dancers. These variations must result in the same movement as the rest of the line, but may consist of additional or slightly different steps.

For example, the basic pajdushko horo dance consists of a series of four hop-steps (actually, lift-steps) to the right, followed by a series of four steps to the left where the right foot crosses in front of the left foot on the quick beat, then weight is transferred onto the right foot, which pushes the dancer to the left on the slow beat. Finally, the line moves backwards using four hop-steps, and the dance is repeated. Variations might consist of alternating the right foot in front of and behind the left foot, forming a basic grapevine dance step. Another variation might be that instead of hop-steps backwards, a dancer might use a series of scissor steps and end with a pas-de-bas step.

== See also ==
- List of folk dances sorted by origin
- Bistritsa Babi
- International folk dance
