= Lesnoto =

Lesnoto (Macedonian and Bulgarian: Лесното, "The Easy One" or "The Simple One"), or Lesno, is the name of a family of simple, popular folk dances from North Macedonia, also done in Bulgaria and parts of neighboring Balkan countries. It is a line dance, usually done to a seven-beat meter organized in a slow (3 beats), quick (2 beats), quick (2 beats) rhythm, often abbreviated 3+2+2. The common factor of all the forms is a pattern of "three steps to the right, one step to the left". These are probably the most common dances in the region, done at parties and mehanas (cafés) to both traditional and modern music.

== Alternate names ==
The dance is also referred to by many local names. In Macedonia: Pravoto and Ramnoto (both mean 'direct' or 'straight'), Za ramo ('by the shoulders', referring to the men's shoulder hold), or Tesko ('heavy', in the sense of slow and deliberate). Often it is called by the name of a popular tune it is danced to. In Bulgaria, it is sometimes called simply Makedonsko horo ('the Macedonian dance').

The name lesnoto is of more recent origin. According to one source, the Yugoslav folk dance collectors Ljuba and Danica Janković first applied the term, meaning 'light' or 'easy', to the vast category of dances having the general pattern "3 steps right, one step left" in 1939. The term spread during the 1940s and 50s among choreographers and dance scholars, until today Lesnoto is a standard term for this dance family.

== Description ==
Lesnoto is a line dance, with the dancers in a curved line or open circle facing in, holding hands. Originally, men and women danced in separate lines, or in a gender-segregated line, with men on the tail end. Men danced in shoulder hold, their arms horizontal, hands resting on their neighbor's shoulder, while women held hands at shoulder height, their arms in a "W" shape, right hand palm up, left hand palm down. Today, it is usually done in mixed lines, with all dancers using either the "W" handhold or shoulder hold. The dance has a three measure pattern, repeated throughout the dance; two measures moving to the dancer's right, one moving to the left, so the line moves slowly to the right. The dancer at the right end is responsible for leading the line so it does not collide with other lines. One common form of the dance is:

Measure 1: 1.(slow beat) step right sideways on right foot, 2.(quick beat) step in front of right on left foot, 3.(quick beat) pause;

Measure 2: 1.(slow beat) step right sideways on right foot, 2.(quick beat) touch left foot in front of right, or raise left leg, bending knee, in front of right, 3.(quick beat) pause;

Measure 3: 1.(slow beat) step left sideways on left foot, 2.(quick beat) touch right foot in front of left, or raise right leg, bending knee, in front of left, 3.(quick beat) pause;

There are gender differences in styling, with men's movements more exaggerated and powerful, with higher leg lifts, while women's movements are smaller and more demure. The music often speeds up during the dance, with the dance starting slow and deliberate and progressing to very fast and lively.

== See also ==
- Bulgarian dances
