= Time signature =

Specification of beats in a musical bar/measure

An example of a 3/4 time signature. The time signature indicates that there are three quarter notes (crotchets) per measure (bar).

A time signature (also known as meter signature, metre signature, and measure signature) is an indication in music notation that specifies how many note values of a particular type fit into each measure (bar). The time signature indicates the meter of a musical movement at the bar level.

In a music score the time signature appears as two stacked numerals, such as 4/4 (spoken as four–four time), or a time symbol, such as or (spoken as common time or cut time, respectively). It immediately follows the key signature (or if there is no key signature, the clef symbol). A mid-score time signature, usually immediately following a barline, indicates a change of meter.

Most time signatures are either simple (the note values are grouped in pairs, like 2/4, 3/4, and 4/4), or compound (grouped in threes, like 6/8, 9/8, and 12/8). Less common signatures indicate complex, mixed, additive, and irrational meters.

Basic time signatures: 4/4, also known as common time; 2/2, alla breve, also known as cut time or cut-common time; 2/4; 3/4; and 6/8

== Time signature notation ==
Most time signatures consist of two numerals, one stacked above the other:

- The lower numeral indicates the note value that the signature is counting. This number is always a power of 2 (unless the time signature is irrational), usually 2, 4 or 8, but less often 16 is also used, usually in Baroque music. 2 corresponds to the half note (minim), 4 to the quarter note (crotchet), 8 to the eighth note (quaver), 16 to the sixteenth note (semiquaver).
- The upper numeral indicates how many such note values constitute a bar.

For instance, 2/4 means two quarter-notes (crotchets) per bar, while 4/8 means four eighth-notes (quavers) per bar. The most common time signatures are 2/4, 3/4, and 4/4.

=== Symbolic signatures ===
By convention, two special symbols are sometimes used for 4/4 and 2/2:

- The symbol is sometimes used for 4/4 time, also called common time or imperfect time.
- The symbol is sometimes used in place of 2/2 and is called alla breve or, colloquially, cut time or cut common time.

These symbols derive from mensural time signatures, described below.

== Frequently used time signatures ==
=== Simple versus compound ===
Simple meters are those whose upper number is 2, 3, or 4, sometimes described as duple meter, triple meter, and quadruple meter respectively.

In compound meter, the note values specified by the bottom number are grouped into threes, and the upper number is a multiple of 3, such as 6, 9, or 12. The lower number is most commonly an 8 (an eighth-note or quaver): as in 9/8 or 12/8.

Other upper numbers correspond to irregular meters.

=== Beat and subdivision ===
Musical passages commonly feature a recurring pulse, or beat, usually in the range of 60–140 beats per minute. Depending on the tempo of the music, this beat may correspond to the note value specified by the time signature, or to a grouping of such note values. Most commonly, in simple time signatures, the beat is the same as the note value of the signature, but in compound signatures, the beat is usually a dotted note value corresponding to three of the signature's note values. Either way, the next lower note value shorter than the beat is called the subdivision.

On occasion a bar may seem like one singular beat. For example, a fast waltz, notated in 3/4 time, may be described as being one in a bar. Conversely, at slow tempos, the beat might even be a smaller note value than the one enumerated by the time signature.

Mathematically the time signatures of, e.g., 3/4 and 3/8 are interchangeable. In a sense all simple triple time signatures, such as 3/8, 3/4, 3/2, etc.—and all compound duple times, such as 6/8, 6/16 and so on, are equivalent. A piece in 3/4 can be easily rewritten in 3/8, simply by halving the length of the notes.

Other time signature rewritings are possible: most commonly a simple time-signature with triplets translates into a compound meter.

The choice of time signature in these cases is largely a matter of tradition. Particular time signatures are traditionally associated with different music styles—it would seem strange to notate a conventional rock song in 4/8 or 4/2, rather than 4/4.

=== Examples ===
In the examples below, bold denotes the primary stress of the measure, and italics denote a secondary stress. Syllables such as "and" are frequently used for pulsing in between numbers.

Simple: 3/4 is a simple triple meter time signature that represents three quarter notes (crotchets), usually perceived as three beats. In this case the subdivision would be the eighth note (quaver). It is felt as

3/4: one and two and three and ...

Compound: Most often, 6/8 is felt as two beats, each being a dotted quarter note (crotchet), and each containing subdivisions of three eighth notes (quavers). It is felt as

6/8: one two three four five six ...

The table below shows the characteristics of the most frequently used time signatures.

Simple time signatures
| Time signature | Common uses | Simple drum pattern | Video representation |
|---|---|---|---|
| 4/4 or (quadruple) | Common time: Widely used in classical music and most forms of popular music. Most common time signature in rock, blues, country, funk, and pop. | | |
| 2/2 or (duple) | Alla breve, cut time: Used for marches and fast orchestral music. | | |
| 2/4 (duple) | Used for polkas, galops, marches, and many styles of Latin music (including bolero, cumbia, and merengue). | | |
| 3/4 (triple) | Used for waltzes, minuets, scherzi, polonaises, mazurkas, country & western ballads, R&B, and some pop. | | |
| 3/8 (triple) | Also used for the above but usually suggests higher tempo or shorter hypermeter. Sometimes preferred for certain folk dances such as cachucha. | | |
Compound time signatures
| Time signature | Common uses | Simple drum pattern | Video representation |
| 6/8 (duple) | Double jigs, jotas, zortzikos, polkas, sega, salegy, tarantella, marches, barcarolles, loures, and some rock music. Anapestic tetrameter poetry also fits into 6/8 time when said aloud. | | |
| 9/8 (triple) | Compound triple time: Used in slip jigs; otherwise occurring rarely ("The Ride of the Valkyries", Tchaikovsky's Fourth Symphony, and the final movement of J.S. Bach's Violin Concerto in A minor (BWV 1041) are familiar examples. Debussy's "Clair de lune" and the opening bars of Prélude à l'après-midi d'un faune are also in 9/8, as well as the title screen theme from The Legend of Zelda: The Wind Waker.) | | |
| 12/8 (quadruple) | Also common in slower blues (where it is called a shuffle) and doo-wop; also used more recently in rock music. Can also be heard in some jigs like "The Irish Washerwoman". This is also the time signature of Scene by the Brook, the second movement of Beethoven's Pastoral Symphony. | | |

=== Tempo giusto ===
While changing the bottom number and keeping the top number fixed only formally changes notation, without changing meaning – 3/8, 3/4, 3/2, and 3/1 are all three beats to a meter, just noted with eighth notes, quarter notes, half notes, or whole notes – these conventionally imply different performance and different tempi. Conventionally, larger numbers in the bottom correspond to faster tempi and smaller numbers correspond to slower tempi. This convention is known as tempo giusto, and means that the tempo of each note remains in a narrower, "normal" range. For illustration, a quarter note might correspond to 60–120 bpm (quintuplet 75–150, triplet 90–180 and septuplet 105–210), a half note to 30–60 bpm (triplet 45–90), a whole note to 15–30 bpm, and an eighth note to 120–240 bpm; these are not strict, but show an example of "normal" ranges.

This convention dates to the Baroque era, when tempo changes were indicated by changing time signature during the piece, rather than by using a single time signature and changing tempo marking.

== Complex time signatures ==
19/16 Time Drum Beat

Signatures that do not fit the usual simple or compound categories are called complex, asymmetric, irregular, unusual, or odd—though these are broad terms, and usually a more specific description is any meter which combines both simple and compound beats.

Irregular meters are common in some non-Western music, and in ancient Greek music such as the Delphic Hymns to Apollo, but the corresponding time signatures rarely appeared in formal written Western music until the 19th century. Early anomalous examples appeared in Spain between 1516 and 1520, plus a small section in Handel's opera Orlando (1733).

The third movement of Frédéric Chopin's Piano Sonata No. 1 (1828) is an early, but by no means the earliest, example of 5/4 time in solo piano music. Anton Reicha's Fugue No. 20 from his Thirty-six Fugues, published in 1803, is also for piano and is in 5/8. The waltz-like second movement of Tchaikovsky's Pathétique Symphony (shown below), often described as a "limping waltz", is a notable example of 5/4 time in orchestral music.

Examples from 20th-century classical music include:

- Gustav Holst's "Mars, the Bringer of War" and "Neptune, the Mystic" from The Planets (both in 5/4)
- Paul Hindemith's "Fuga secunda" in G from Ludus Tonalis (5/8)
- the ending of Stravinsky's The Firebird (7/4)
- the fugue from Heitor Villa-Lobos's Bachianas Brasileiras No. 9 (11/8)
- the themes for the Mission: Impossible television series by Lalo Schifrin (in 5/4) and for Room 222 by Jerry Goldsmith (in 7/4)

In the Western popular music tradition, unusual time signatures occur as well, with progressive rock in particular making frequent use of them. The use of shifting meters in The Beatles' "Strawberry Fields Forever" and the use of quintuple meter in their "Within You, Without You" are well-known examples, as is Radiohead's "Paranoid Android" (includes 7/8).

Paul Desmond's jazz composition "Take Five", in 5/4 time, was one of a number of irregular-meter compositions that The Dave Brubeck Quartet played. They played other compositions in 11/4 ("Eleven Four"), 7/4 ("Unsquare Dance"), and 9/8 ("Blue Rondo à la Turk"), expressed as 2+2+2+3/8. "Blue Rondo à la Turk" is an example of a signature that, despite appearing merely compound triple, is actually more complex. Brubeck's title refers to the characteristic aksak meter of the Turkish karşılama dance.

However, such time signatures are only unusual in most Western music. Traditional music of the Balkans uses such meters extensively. Bulgarian dances, for example, include forms with 5, 7, 9, 11, 13, 15, 22, 25 and other numbers of beats per measure. These rhythms are notated as additive rhythms based on simple units, usually 2, 3 and 4 beats, though the notation fails to describe the metric "time bending" taking place, or compound meters. See Additive meters below.

Some video samples are shown below.

| 5/4 at 60 bpm | 7/4 at 60 bpm | 11/4 at 60 bpm |

== Mixed meters ==
While time signatures usually express a regular pattern of beat stresses continuing through a piece (or at least a section), sometimes composers change time signatures often enough to result in music with an extremely irregular rhythm. The time signature may switch so much that a piece may not be best described as being in one meter, but rather as having a switching mixed meter. In this case, the time signatures are an aid to the performers and not necessarily an indication of meter. The Promenade from Modest Mussorgsky's Pictures at an Exhibition (1874) is a good example. The opening measures are shown below:

Igor Stravinsky's The Rite of Spring (1913) is famous for its "savage" rhythms. Five measures from "Sacrificial Dance" are shown below:

In such cases, a convention that some composers follow (e.g., Olivier Messiaen, in his La Nativité du Seigneur and Quatuor pour la fin du temps) is to simply omit the time signature. Charles Ives's Concord Sonata has measure bars for select passages, but the majority of the work is unbarred.

Some pieces have no time signature, as there is no discernible meter. This is sometimes known as free time. Sometimes one is provided (usually 4/4) so that the performer finds the piece easier to read, and simply has "free time" written as a direction. Sometimes the word FREE is written downwards on the staff to indicate the piece is in free time. Erik Satie wrote many compositions that are ostensibly in free time but actually follow an unstated and unchanging simple time signature. Later composers used this device more effectively, writing music almost devoid of a discernibly regular pulse.

If two time signatures alternate repeatedly, sometimes the two signatures are placed together at the beginning of the piece or section, as shown below:

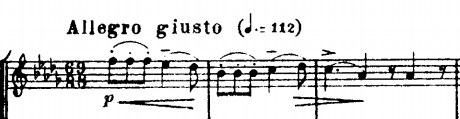
Detail of a score of Tchaikovsky's String Quartet No. 2 in F major, showing a multiple time signature

== Additive meters ==
To indicate more complex patterns of stresses, such as additive rhythms, more complex time signatures can be used. Additive meters have a pattern of beats that subdivide into smaller, irregular groups. Such meters are sometimes called imperfect, in contrast to perfect meters, in which the bar is first divided into equal units.

For example, the time signature 3+2+3/8 means that there are 8 quaver beats in the bar, divided as the first of a group of three eighth notes (quavers) that are stressed, then the first of a group of two, then first of a group of three again. The stress pattern is usually counted as

3+2+3/8: one two three one two one two three ...

This kind of time signature is commonly used to notate folk and non-Western types of music. In classical music, Béla Bartók and Olivier Messiaen have used such time signatures in their works. The first movement of Maurice Ravel's Piano Trio in A Minor is written in 8/8, in which the beats are likewise subdivided into 3+2+3 to reflect Basque dance rhythms. 8/8 is also often used in boogie-woogie music, as mentioned in the song "Beat Me Daddy, Eight to the Bar."

Romanian musicologist Constantin Brăiloiu had a special interest in compound time signatures, developed while studying the traditional music of certain regions in his country. While investigating the origins of such unusual meters, he learned that they were even more characteristic of the traditional music of neighboring peoples (e.g., the Bulgarians). He suggested that such timings can be regarded as compounds of simple two-beat and three-beat meters, where an accent falls on every first beat, even though, for example in Bulgarian music, beat lengths of 1, 2, 3, 4 are used in the metric description. In addition, when focused only on stressed beats, simple time signatures can count as beats in a slower, compound time. However, there are two different-length beats in this resulting compound time, a one half-again longer than the short beat (or conversely, the short beat is 2/3 the value of the long). This type of meter is called aksak (the Turkish word for "limping"), impeded, jolting, or shaking, and is described as an irregular bichronic rhythm. A certain amount of confusion for Western musicians is inevitable, since a measure they would likely regard as 7/16, for example, is a three-beat measure in aksak, with one long and two short beats (with subdivisions of 2+2+3, 2+3+2, or 3+2+2).

Folk music may make use of metric time bends, so that the proportions of the performed metric beat time lengths differ from the exact proportions indicated by the metric. Depending on playing style of the same meter, the time bend can vary from non-existent to considerable; in the latter case, some musicologists may want to assign a different meter. For example, the Bulgarian tune "Eleno Mome" is written in one of three forms: (1) 7 = 2+2+1+2, (2) 13 = 4+4+2+3, or (3) 12 = 3+4+2+3, but an actual performance (e.g., "Eleno Mome") may be closer to 4+4+2+3. The Macedonian 3+2+2+3+2 meter is even more complicated, with heavier time bends, and use of quadruples on the threes. The metric beat time proportions may vary with the speed that the tune is played. The Swedish Boda Polska (Polska from the parish Boda) has a typical elongated second beat.

In Western classical music, metric time bend is used in the performance of the Viennese waltz. Most Western music uses metric ratios of 2:1, 3:1, or 4:1 (two-, three- or four-beat time signatures)—in other words, integer ratios that make all beats equal in time length. So, relative to that, 3:2 and 4:3 ratios correspond to very distinctive metric rhythm profiles. Complex accentuation occurs in Western music, but as syncopation rather than as part of the metric accentuation.

Brăiloiu borrowed a term from Turkish medieval music theory: aksak. Such compound time signatures fall under the "aksak rhythm" category that he introduced along with a couple more that should describe the rhythm figures in traditional music. The term Brăiloiu revived had moderate success worldwide, but in Eastern Europe it is still frequently used. However, aksak rhythm figures occur not only in a few European countries, but on all continents, featuring various combinations of the two and three sequences. The longest are in Bulgaria. The shortest aksak rhythm figures follow the five-beat timing, comprising a two and a three (or three and two).

Some video samples are shown below.

| 3+2+3/8 at 120 bpm | The rhythm of Dave Brubeck's "Blue Rondo à la Turk": It consists of three measures of 2+2+2+3 followed by one measure of 3+3+3 and the cycle then repeats. Taking the smallest time unit as eighth notes, the arrows on the tempo dial show the tempi for ♪, ♩, ♩. and the measure beat. Starts slow, speeds up to usual tempo |

A method to create meters of lengths of any length has been published in the Journal of Anaphoria Music Theory and Xenharmonikon 16 using both those based on the Horograms of Erv Wilson and Viggo Brun's algorithm written by Kraig Grady.

== Irrational meters ==
Example of an irrational 4/3 time signature: here there are four (4) third notes (3) per measure. A "third note" would be one third of a whole note, and thus is a triplet half-note. The second measure of 4/2 presents the same notes, so the 4/3 time signature serves to indicate the precise speed relationship between the notes in the two measures.

Irrational time signatures (rarely, "non-dyadic time signatures", or "odd-factored time signatures") are used for so-called irrational bar lengths, that have a denominator that is not a power of two (1, 2, 4, 8, 16, 32, etc.). These are based on beats expressed in terms of fractions of full beats in the prevailing tempo—for example 3/10 or 6/7. For example, where 4/4 implies a bar construction of four quarter-parts of a whole note (i.e., four quarter notes), 4/3 implies a bar construction of four third-parts of it. These signatures are of utility only when juxtaposed with other signatures with varying denominators; a piece written entirely in 4/3 could be more legibly written out in 4/4.

The same example written using metric modulation instead of irrational time signatures. Three half notes in the first measure (making up a dotted whole note) are equal in duration to two half notes in the second (making up a whole note).
The same example written using a change in time signature.

According to Brian Ferneyhough, metric modulation is "a somewhat distant analogy" to his own use of "irrational time signatures" as a sort of rhythmic dissonance. It is disputed whether the use of these signatures makes metric relationships clearer or more obscure to the musician; it is always possible to write a passage using non-irrational signatures by specifying a relationship between some note length in the previous bar and some other in the succeeding one. Sometimes, successive metric relationships between bars are so convoluted that the pure use of irrational signatures would quickly render the notation extremely hard to penetrate.

Historically, this device has been prefigured wherever composers wrote tuplets. For example, a 2/4 bar of 3 triplet quarter notes could be written as a bar of 3/6. Henry Cowell's piano piece Fabric (1920) employs separate divisions of the bar (1 to 9) for the three contrapuntal parts, using a scheme of shaped noteheads to visually clarify the differences, but the pioneering of these signatures is largely due to Brian Ferneyhough, who says that he finds that "such 'irrational' measures serve as a useful buffer between local changes of event density and actual changes of base tempo". Thomas Adès has also used them extensively—for example in Traced Overhead (1996), the second movement of which contains, among more conventional meters, bars in such signatures as 2/6 and 9/14.

Notationally, rather than using Cowell's elaborate series of notehead shapes, the same convention has been invoked as when normal tuplets are written; for example, one beat in 4/5 is written as a normal quarter note, four quarter notes complete the bar, but the whole bar lasts only 4/5 of a reference whole note, and a beat 1/5 of one (or 4/5 of a normal quarter note). This is notated in exactly the same way that one would write if one were writing the first four quarter notes of five quintuplet quarter notes.

Some video samples are shown below.

These video samples show two time signatures combined to make a polymeter, since 4/3, in isolation, is identical to 4/4.

| Polymeter 4/4 and 4/3 played together has three beats of 4/3 to four beats of 4/4 | Polymeter 2/6 and 3/4 played together has six beats of 2/6 to four beats of 3/4 | Polymeter 2/5 and 2/3 played together has five beats of 2/5 to three beats of 2/3. The displayed numbers count the underlying polyrhythm, which is 5:3 |

== Variants ==
Some composers have used fractional beats: for example, the time signature ^{2 1/2}_{4} (equivalent to 5/8) appears in Carlos Chávez's Piano Sonata No. 3 (1928) IV, m. 1. Both ^{2 1/2}_{4} and ^{1 1/2}_{4} appear in the fifth movement of Percy Grainger's Lincolnshire Posy.

Example of Orff's time signatures (traditionally, these would be notated 3/8 and 6/8 respectively)

Music educator Carl Orff proposed replacing the lower number of the time signature with an actual note image, as shown at right. This system eliminates the need for compound time signatures, which are confusing to beginners. While this notation has not been adopted by music publishers generally (except in Orff's own compositions), it is used extensively in music education textbooks. Similarly, American composers George Crumb and Joseph Schwantner, among others, have used this system in many of their works. Émile Jaques-Dalcroze proposed this in his 1920 collection, Le Rythme, la musique et l'éducation.

Another possibility is to extend the barline where a time change is to take place above the top instrument's line in a score and to write the time signature there, and there only, saving the ink and effort that would have been spent writing it in each instrument's staff. Henryk Górecki's Beatus Vir is an example of this. Alternatively, music in a large score sometimes has time signatures written as very long, thin numbers covering the whole height of the score rather than replicating it on each staff; this is an aid to the conductor, who can see signature changes more easily.

== Early music usage ==
=== Mensural time signatures ===
In the mensural notation of the 14th, 15th and 16th centuries there are no bar lines, and the four basic mensuration signs,,, indicate the normal ratio of duration between different note values. Unlike modern notation, the subdivisions could be either 2:1 or 3:1. The relation between the breve and the semibreve was called tempus, and could be perfect (triple 3:1 indicated by circle) or imperfect (duple 2:1, with broken circle), while the relation between the semibreve and the minim was called prolatio and could be major (3:1 or compound, indicated by dot) or minor (2:1 or simple meter).

Modern transcriptions often reduce note values 4:1, such that

- corresponds to 9/8 meter;
- corresponds to 3/4 meter;
- corresponds to 6/8 meter;
- corresponds to 2/4 meter.

In mensural notation actual note values depend not only on the prevailing mensuration, but on rules for imperfection and alteration, with ambiguous cases using a dot of separation, similar in appearance but not always in effect to the modern dot of augmentation.

=== Proportions ===
Proportion signs
| Proportion | Notated values | equivalent to | Notated values |
|---|---|---|---|
| 2 or | | Semicircle without dot | |
| 2 or | two semibreves | Circle without dot | three semibreves three groups of two minims |
| 3 | three semibreves | Semicircle with dot | two semibreves two groups of three minims |
| 3 | three semibreves | Circle with dot | three groups of three minims |

Besides showing the organization of beats with musical meter, the mensuration signs discussed above have a second function, which is showing tempo relationships between one section to another, which modern notation can only specify with tuplets or metric modulations. This is a fraught subject, because the usage has varied with both time and place: Charles Hamm was even able to establish a rough chronology of works based on three distinct usages of mensural signs over the career of Guillaume Dufay (1397(?) – 1474). By the end of the sixteenth century Thomas Morley was able to satirize the confusion in an imagined dialogue:

it was a world to hear them wrangle, every one defending his own for the best. "What? You keep not time in your proportions." "You sing them false. What proportion is this?" "Sesquipaltry." "Nay, you sing you know not what; it would seem you came lately from a barber's shop where you had 'Gregory Walker' or a Curranta played in the new Proportions by them lately found out, called 'Sesquiblinda' and 'Sesquihearkenafter'."

Plaine and Easie Introduction to Practicall Musicke (1597)

In general though, a slash or the numeral 2 shows a doubling of tempo, and paired numbers (either side by side or one atop another) show ratios instead of beats per measure over note value: in early music contexts 4/3 for example is unrelated to 'third-notes'.

A few common signs are shown:

- tempus imperfectum diminutum, 1:2 proportion (twice as fast);
- tempus perfectum diminutum, 1:2 proportion (twice as fast);
- or proportio tripla, 1:3 proportion (three times as fast, similar to triplets).

In particular, when the sign was encountered, the tactus (beat) changed from the usual whole note (semibreve) to the double whole note (breve), a circumstance called alla breve. This term has been sustained to the present day, and though now it means the beat is a half note (minim), in contradiction to the literal meaning of the phrase, it still indicates that the tactus has changed from a short to a doubled value.

Certain composers delighted in creating mensuration canons, "puzzle" compositions that were intentionally difficult to decipher.

== Irregular bar ==
Irregular bars are a change in time signature normally for only one bar. Such a bar is most often a bar of 3/4, 5/4 or 2/4 in a 4/4 composition, or a bar of 4/4 in a 3/4 composition, or a bar of 5/8 in a 6/8 composition.

If a song is entirely in 4/4, a change to 3/4 will make the song feel like it has skipped a beat. The opposite is true for 5/4, where it feels like the song adds a beat. If a song changes to 2/4 is will make it feel like that bar is half as long as all the others.

Some popular examples include "Golden Brown" by The Stranglers (4/4 in a 3/4 composition), "I Love Rock 'n' Roll" originally by The Arrows (7/4 in a 4/4 composition), "Hey Ya!" by Outkast (2/4 in a 4/4 composition), and "Wuthering Heights" by Kate Bush (different kinds of irregular bars in a 4/4 composition).

== See also ==
- Schaffel, a kind of swing in rock and techno music
- Tala, meter in Indian music
- Colotomy, a coinage by Jap Kunst to describe the metric structure of gamelan music.
