= Paydushko horo =

Paydushko horo (Bulgarian: Пайдушко хоро, romanized: Pajduško horo; Macedonian: Пајдушко оро, romanized: Pajduško oro; Turkish: Payduşka; Albanian: Pajtushka; Greek: Παϊντούσκα, romanized: Baïdouska) is a Balkan folk dance, particularly associated with Bulgaria and North Macedonia. Like many other Balkan folk dances, each region or village has its own version of the figures. The name reflects the rhythm: paydushko derives from the Turkish word paytak, meaning "a person with uneven legs" (i.e. someone who limps), which refers to the limping step pattern of the dance.

It is a line dance, with the dancers in a line facing left, holding hands. It is traditionally a men's dance, but in modern times it is often performed in lines of both men and women. It features a 5-beat meter divided into "quick" (2-beat) and "slow" (3-beat) units, abbreviated quick-slow or 2+3.time 5/8. The dance starts moving right with a series of four lift-steps, followed by moving left: crossing the right foot in front of the left, transferring the weight onto the right foot while moving the left foot to the right (this is the characteristic movement of this dance, and is done four times). The dancers next move backwards using a series of four lift-steps.

== Variants ==
A number of variations can be seen among individual dancers. For example, instead of moving left with the right foot always crossing in front, a front and back pattern can be used, resulting in a basic grapevine step. When moving backwards, the lift steps can be replaced by scissor-steps, often ending with a pas-de-basque step.

A common version of this dance is Jambolsko Pajduško oro (yahm-bohl-sko pie-doosh-ko).

The dance is known as the "Drunken Dance (Macedonian: пијано оро, romanized: pijano oro) in Macedonia and is believed to have been brought to Turkey hundreds of years ago within the early stages of the Ottoman rule of Macedonia. The Pajdusko is still danced by many within Turkey, especially Turks of Macedonian ancestry.

== See also ==
- Macedonian dances
- Bulgarian dances
- International folk dance

External videos
- Pajdusko - Macedonian Oro Tutorial
- ПАЙДУШКО ХОРО - NORTH BULGARIA
- Bulgarian Paidushko horo
- MKD MAKEDONIJA-SPLIT- PAJDUŠKO ORO.vob
- Δυτική Θράκη - Μπαϊντούσκα
- Μπαϊντούσκα Β. Θράκης - Δόρα Στράτου 2014
- Trakya Oyun Havaları - Payduşka
- Muammer Ketencoğlu - Payduşka (Pajdushko) - 26.02.2013
