= Viltis (magazine) =

Viltis (meaning Hope in Lithuanian) is a magazine of folklore, folk music and folk dance. It was created by Vytautas Beliajus in the 1940s and was one of the first magazines devoted to folk customs and arts. It is illustrated and printed in English. The headquarters was in Denver, Colorado.

== History and profile ==
Viltis began as a mimeographed armed services newsletter in May 1943 in Fairhope, Alabama. In September 1944 it became a printed publication. Beliajus edited the magazine until his death in 1994 when its publication was assumed by the International Institute of Wisconsin. The magazine is published six times per year.

Its scope is international, and a typical issues covers several different regions. Issues include recipes, dance descriptions, book reviews, research articles, performance reviews, travel tips, costuming advice, and other topics.

Viltis is available on microfilm at Xerox's University Microfilms in Ann Arbor, Michigan. An Index to Viltis 1944-1994 is also available.
