= Ashkenaz (music venue) =

Coordinates: 37.8801°N 122.2955°W

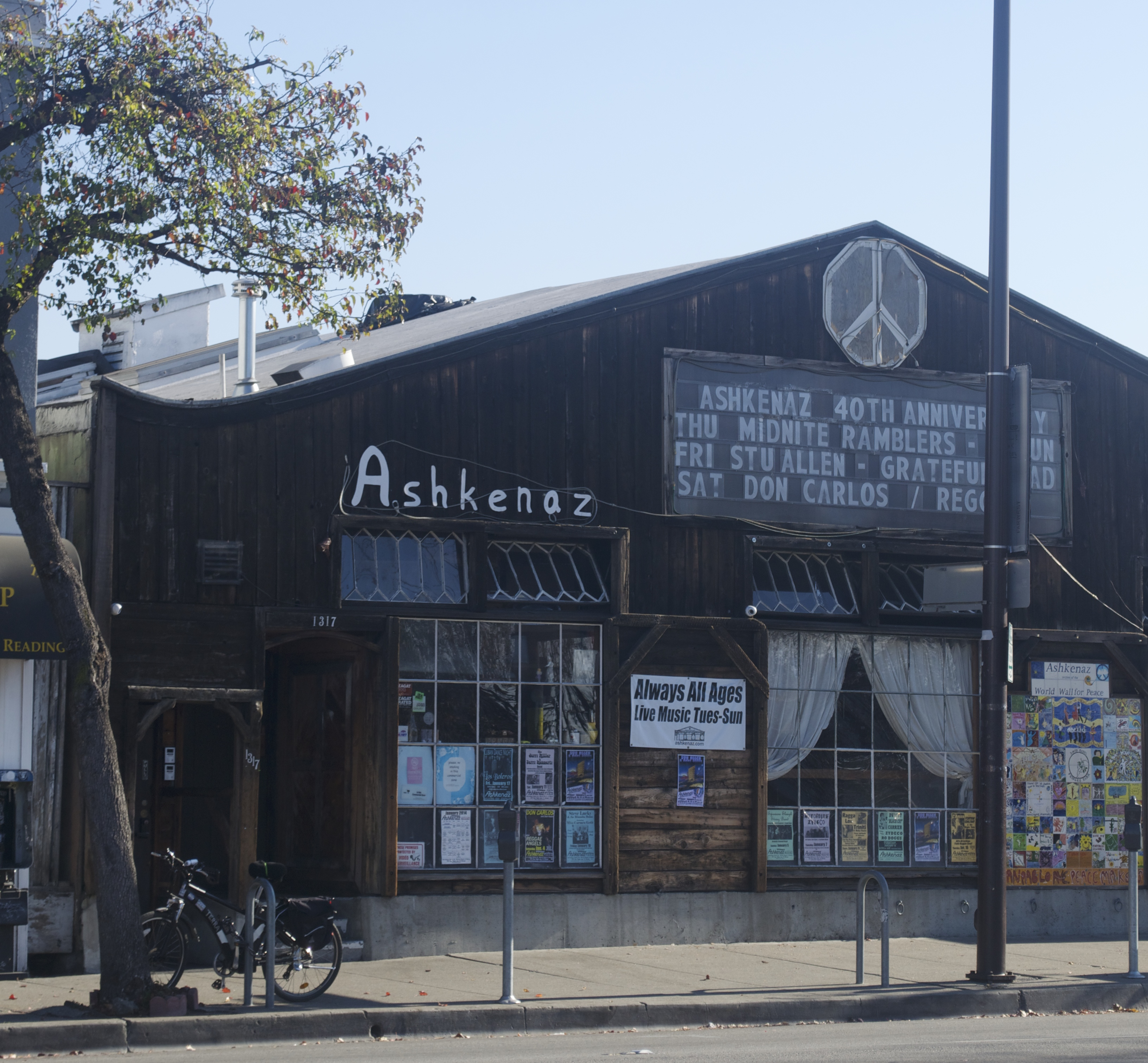
- Interactive map of Ashkenaz
- Address: Berkeley, California; United States
- Designation: Berkeley Landmark

The Ashkenaz is a live music and dance venue located in Berkeley, California in the United States. It is a non-profit organization. It focuses on world music. In 2011 it was voted the best place to dance by readers of East Bay Express. It has been listed as a Berkeley Landmark since September 8, 1992, under the name Ashkenaz Music and Dance Community Center.

== History ==
Ashkenaz opened in 1973 and was founded by performance artist and activist David Nadel. After relocating from Los Angeles to attend University of California, Berkeley, Nadel formed a dance troupe. The troupe started renting spaces on San Pablo Avenue. Nadel, along with six other people, would go on to buy the building where Ashkenaz is located today. He named the organization after his Ashkenazi Jewish ancestry. The original building was a series of old retail shops. Nadel and friends built the wooden facade that is seen today. It is supposed to resemble an Eastern European synagogue. It totals 5,000 square feet. In 1993, the city of Berkeley named the Ashkenaz a city landmark.

On December 19, 1996, Juan Rivera Pérez was kicked out of the club by Nadel in-between sets. The patron returned during the second set and shot Nadel point blank in the head. Nadel died from the gunshot wound at the hospital and Pirez was never found. In wake of the shooting, a group of Ashkenaz patrons bought it and then formed a nonprofit. It re-opened six months later, on June 21, 1997.

== Today ==
It caters to world music, both local and international. Music genres range from hip-hop to Cajun music. They also host events focused around Judaism, including holiday celebrations and klezmer concerts. The majority of concerts start with a dance lesson based around the style or genre of the music. They host benefits for local organizations and activists, such as the American Indian Movement and Nature Conservancy. The organization aims to be a zero waste business. They recycle everything and provide customers glasses of water instead of water bottles. They once had a television program on Berkeley Community Television called Ashkenaz Live, where they showcased performances and history of the performers' genres. Ashkenaz also had a live children's program where musicians play to local children on Sundays. The venue has a stage, a dance studio, and a café serving beer, wine and vegetarian food. A space upstairs where Nadel used to live is an office space. It continues to thrive as a concert venue, dance studio, and community hub for a wide array of cultures, and communities.

== See also ==
- International folk dancing
