= Leventikos =

Type of dance

Leventikos (Greek: Λεβέντικος, Levéntikos); or Bufčansko (Macedonian: Буфчанско), also known as Litós (Λιτός), Kucano, Nešo or Pusteno, is a dance of western Macedonia, mainly performed by Slav Macedonians and Greeks in the town of Florina, Greece and in the Resen and Bitola regions in the neighbouring North Macedonia.

Reflecting the dance steps: slow-quick-quick-slow-quick, the meter comprises five beats of varying length but these lengths come in different variations:

- One is 12/8, counting the beats as 3+2+2+3+2, with the metric 3's divided into quadruplets, but at higher speed, the metric accents may sound more like 3+4+3+2.
- Another one is 16/8, counting the beats as 4+2+3+4+3, where metric 4's have sub-beats 2+2.

The third (second 2) beat may be lengthened relative to its written value in both variations but less so at higher speeds. The last (third 2) beat may be shortened, a common Balkan treatment of meters.

The 12/8 meter appears in traditional Northern and Southern Albanian ballads, in dance tunes such as Berace, and in Macedonian dances such as Beranče, Bajrače and Bufčansko (Macedonian: Буфчанско; also called Bufskoto or Bufsko). The 16/8 meter has appeared more recently in various tunes for the Leventikos dance in the Florina region of Greece, and in Macedonian dances like Pušteno, in renditions of the same songs that were traditionally rendered in 11/8 or 12/8. For example, for the tune Ibraim Odza there are different performances in both 12/8 and 16/8 .

The Levendikos dance performed in Petroussa is very different from the one in Florina.

== In popular culture ==
- The Buvčansko theme can also be heard as part of Macedon's theme in Civilization VI.

== See also ==
- Macedonian music
- Greek dances
- Greek folk music
- Hora (dance)
