= Kpanlogo (drum) =

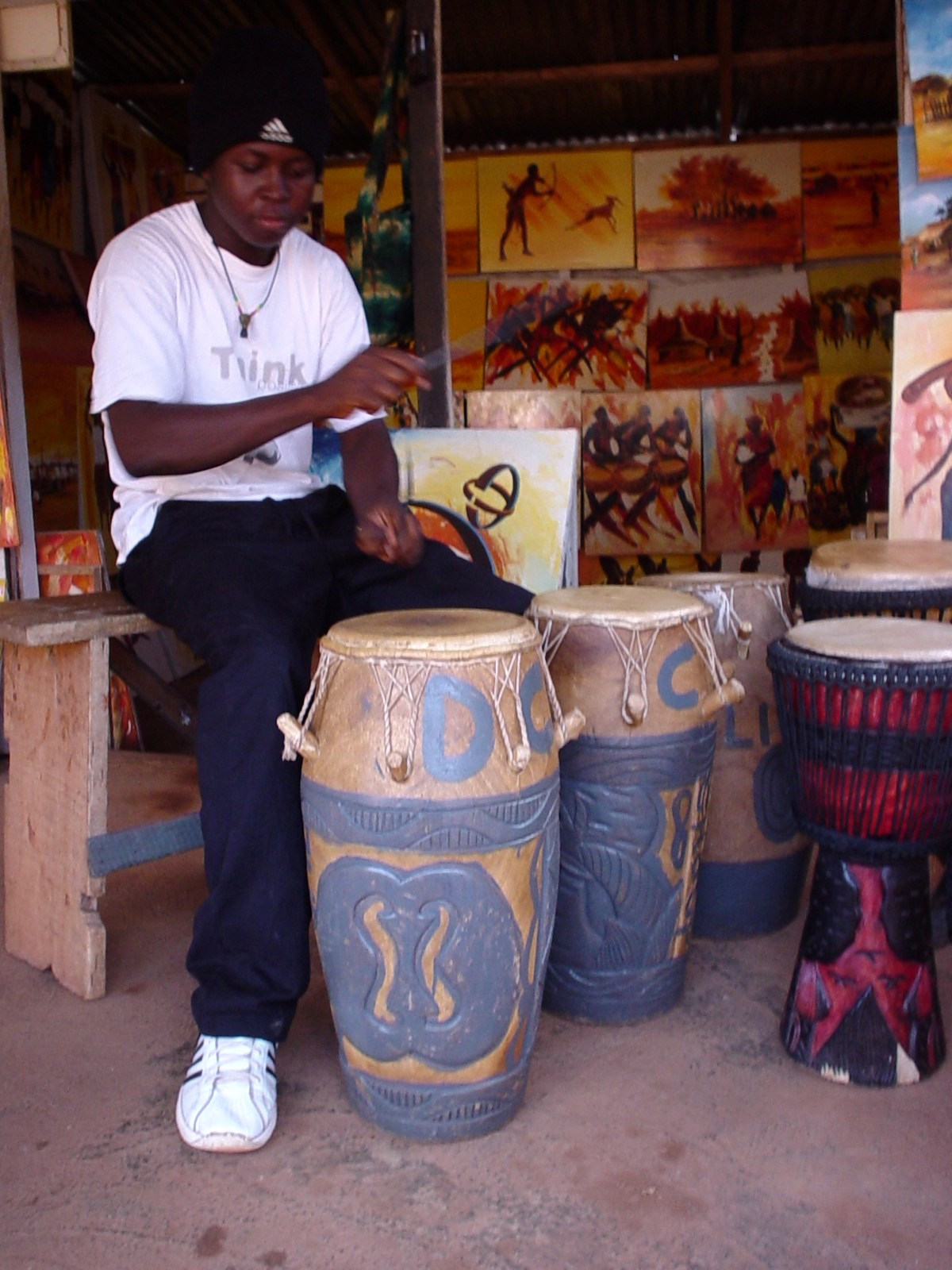
- Other names: Tswreshi
- Classification: Membranophone

Related instruments
- Ashiko, Djembe, Ewe Drums nono

Kpanlogo (pronounced "PAHN-loh-goh"), traditionally named Tswreshi or Treshi is a type of barrel drum that is associated with Kpanlogo music, and is usually played with two hands. The drum originates from the Ga people of the Greater Accra Region in Ghana, West Africa.

Kpanlogo is the name of a rhythm played on the tswreshi. The rhythm was composed around the 1950s in the wake of Ghana’s independence, and became popular. It is known as Ghana’s signature rhythm. Because of the popularity of the rhythm, the tswreshi became widely known as the kpanlogo drum.

Kpanlogo are traditionally played by an ensemble of drummers, often in sets of six kpanlogo drums of varied size. Djembe, Dunun, and Gankogui usually accompany the kpanlogo.
