= Handhold (dance) =

A handhold is a manner in which the dancers hold each other's hands during the dance. A hold is the way one partner holds another one with hands. Hold and handhold are important components of connection in dance.

== Couple dances ==
- Waist-hand hold
- Shoulder-waist hold
- Shoulder blade hold
- Ballroom hold
- Banjo hold
- Barn dance hold
- Butterfly hold: in face-to-face dance position, the arms are extended sideways palm to palm, elbows slightly bent
- Shoulder hold (varsouvienne hold)
- Cross-back hold
- Promenade hold
- Short-arm hold
- Skaters hold
  - Back skaters hold: partners side-by-side, same hands joined, man right arm around lady's waist with right hands on the lady's right hip, left hands joined in front, man's hand palm up
  - Front skaters hold
- V hold
- Hammerlock hold
- Sweetheart hold
- Cuddle hold

== Line/circle dances ==
When danced in line or circle formation, the handholds usually connect a dancer with the two immediate neighbors, sometimes with the two second next neighbors. Exceptions are free hands of the first and last persons in the line formation.

A number of these holds may be used in couple dances (a couple is a line of just two).

- Shoulder hold
- Chain hold
- Basket hold
  - Front basket hold: Arms are extended sideways in front of the neighbors to connect with the arms of the second next person
  - Back basket hold: Arms are extended sideways behind the neighbors to connect with the arms of the second next person
- Belt hold: Each dancer holds the belts of the neighbors
- Escort hold: one arm slightly rounded with arm at waist level, the neighbor from this side place the opposite hand on the forearm through the space formed by founded arm
