= International folk dance =

Activities involving dances from multiple traditions

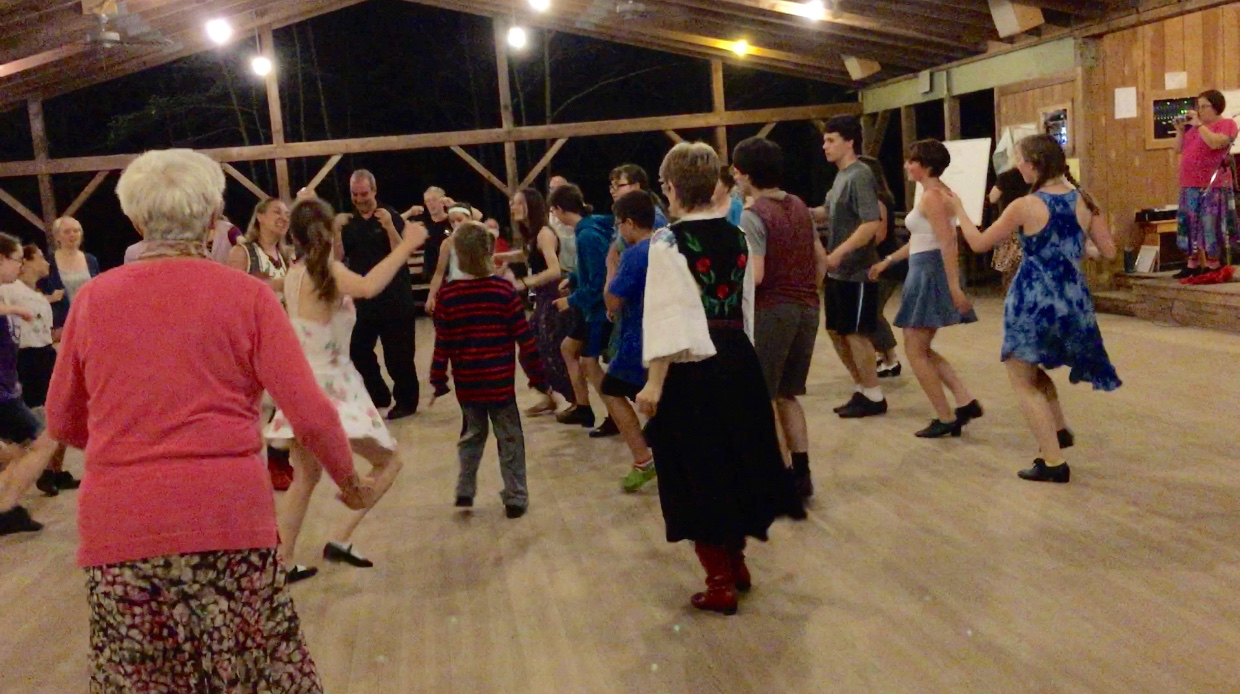
Romanian dance instructors Sonia Dion and Cristian Florescu review a dance at Pinewoods Dance Camp during the Folk Arts Center of New England session in 2015.

International folk dance includes Balkan dance, Middle Eastern dance, contra dance, Hungarian dance, polka, Chinese dance, and Japanese dance. Clubs featuring these ethnic dance genres are enjoyed by non-professional dancers for entertainment. Many clubs that use collections of ethnic folk dances will use the term "international folk dance" or similar in their name.

== History ==
International folk dance developed in the immigrant communities of the United States of America during the first half of the 20th century. Traditional dances such as branles, polkas, quadrilles and others have been done internationally for hundreds of years; however, the creation of international folk dance as such is often attributed to Vytautas Beliajus, a Lithuanian-American who studied, taught, and performed dances from various ethnic traditions in the 1930s.

Also, in the mid 1930s, Scandinavian dancing began to take hold in non-Scandinavian communities. Clubs began to form around this style. A pioneer of this era was the ethnic Chinese illustrator Song Chang, who, struck by the lack of bigotry among the Scandinavian dancers, encouraged others to join, advised clubs, and had a club named in his honor, the Chang's International Folk Dancers, still located in San Francisco. Other prominent teachers and promoters of international folk dance in its first few decades included Michael Herman and Mary Ann Herman, Jane Farwell, and Dick Crum.

Those groups known as international folk dance clubs began to take hold in the 1930s and 1940s, with more diverse selections of music than just Scandinavian, with Balkan dances, Western European dances, and dances from the Philippines. The Folk Dance Federation of California was founded in 1942. By 1946, there were approximately 100 clubs in California alone. In 1948, the College of the Pacific Folk Dance Camp, now known as the Stockton Folk Dance Camp, was founded. Other camps were founded later, and all draw on teaching talent both American and foreign. At the inaugural Statewide Festival held in Ojai, California, occurring on May 11, 1946, there were over 500 dancers and 3000 spectators.

There were two strong influences on international folk dance in the late 1950's and 1960's. One was from eastern European national performing troupes, part of efforts promoting national "socialist" folk culture. The second was from Israeli folk dance, where "folk" dances were composed to help build a common national culture from multiple immigrant and refugee communities. These influences were heightened by the appearances on the Ed Sullivan television show in 1958 of the Russian Moiseyev Ballet and the Karmon Israeli Dancers, and national tours by those and other companies, such as the 1956 US tour by the Macedonian ensemble Tanec. Inspired by these performances, international folk dance performing groups emerged in the US in the 1960's, both amateur and semi-professional, notably the Aman Folk Ensemble in Los Angeles. The performing groups and recreational clubs were often supported by ethnic churches and community centers, such as the 92nd Street Y, and on university campuses. By 1970, major portions of the international folk dance club repertoires were Balkan and Israeli dances.

In 1964, a new idea took hold in a pair of dancers in Los Angeles. Taking a cue from the folk music scene, Rudy Dannes and Athan Karras opened a coffeehouse that also functioned as a place for international folk dancers to dance at night without having to worry about renting a space, called The Intersection. The idea took off, with new people starting their own dance coffeehouses, such as Cafe Danssa in L.A., founded by Dani Dassa, and the famous Ashkenaz in Berkeley, founded by David Nadel in 1973.

In 1975, the Folk Arts Center of New England was founded by Conny Taylor and Marianne Taylor to preserve and encourage international folk dancing and other folk arts.

In the 1980s, costs escalated, and the number of active clubs shrank somewhat. Many events such as camps or festivals had to be put on hold until the organizers could gather the money and the people. In 1984, The Intersection shut its doors due to lowering turnout. However, on the East Coast, the NFO, or the National Folk Organization, was founded in Chicago in 1986 by Vytautas Beliajus, Mary Bee Jensen, George Frandsen, and L. DeWayne Young, an organization dedicated to the preservation of folk arts.

In the 1990s, interest in dancing increased again, and dances from the Chinese, Japanese and Hispanic groups were added to the repertoires over the '80s and '90s as neighborhoods diversified. Ballroom dance, swing dance, tango and salsa dance became more popular, with some dancers from these genres also entering the international folk dance scene as a whole.

International folk dance has grown into a large community of dancers, performing groups and recreational folk dance clubs throughout the United States, Europe, Canada, Japan, Australia and other countries. Dance festivals and conventions are held year-round. Dance "camps" or workshops invite teachers to instruct dancers in dances from many traditions. These groups usually focus on European dances, but the international folk dance repertoire may include dances from every part of the world: Europe, Africa, North and South America, the Middle East, the Far East, Australia and the South Pacific.

== Clubs ==
The most common way to dance "international folk dance" is in a club setting. These can range in style of organization from a small gathering to highly structured and regulated meetings, depending on the preferences of the dancers. Many clubs are associated with international folk dance societies or federations, such as the Folk Dance Federation of California, who provide them with music and exposure. A club can have a mixture of dances on their playlist, or specialize in a single genre or a few genres. (For example, a club could be a Serbian dance club, or a Balkan dance club, or a mixed repertoire with a preference for Balkan, or a club with no preference and a varied playlist.) Many require no experience or partner whatsoever to participate. The most common genres of the clubs that choose a specific genre are Balkan dance, contra dance, and English country dance.

== Classes ==
Many clubs are also classes, or are entirely so. Classes usually have a master teacher, either creating their own event or using time at a club, teaching new dances to add to the repertoire. These are always open to the public and usually have a "party" afterwards where people dance to requests. Some master teachers teach for their livelihoods, while others are local dancers with the will to teach.

== Festivals ==
Festivals are multi-day events that combine the club and class atmosphere. Often a day will be mostly full of teaching sessions and the evening for dancing and requests. Often they sell food to dancers as well. Examples of festivals include the Zlatne Uste Golden Festival in New York City, the Blossom Festival in San Francisco, the Kolo Festival in San Francisco, and the Tanatsfestival in Belgium.

== Camps ==
Camps are essentially festivals that include room and board. Oftentimes dancers sleep on-site or in a hotel that has specifically been reserved for the event, with food and drinks also provided to the dancers. Famous camps include the Stockton Folk Dance Camp in Stockton, CA and Camp Yofi in Italy.

== See also ==
- Folk dance
- List of folk dances sorted by origin
- Circle Dance combining traditional folk and modern community dances
- Hora (dance)
- Kolo (dance)
- Hasapiko
- Syrtos
- Sirtaki
- Dabke
- Bulgarian dances
- Croatian dances
- Contra dance
- Ukrainian dance
- Georgian dance
- Ashkenaz (music venue)
- Athan Karras
