= Glossary of dance moves =

This is an alphabetic list of dance moves.

== A–E ==
=== Apple Jacks ===
A step on the spot, with twisting foot and the weight on the heel, like this.

=== Ball change ===
Ball change is a movement where the dancer shifts the weight from the ball of one foot to the other and back. This is mostly used in jazz and jive.

=== Basic (step / figure / movement / or pattern) ===
A basic figure is the very basic step that defines the character of a dance. Often it is called just thus: "basic movement", "basic step" or the like. For some dances it is sufficient to know the basic step performed in different handholds and dance positions to enjoy it socially.

=== Body roll / body wave ===
In this the dancer moves the body like a wave in standing position from head to legs, like this.

=== Box step ===
Box step

The box step is a dance figure named so because the steps rest in the four corners of a square. It is used, e.g., in American Style ballroom dances: rumba, waltz, bronze-level foxtrot. The leader begins with the left foot and proceeds as follows.

First half-box: Forward-side-together
Second half-box: Backwards-side-together

Every step is with full weight transfer. During the second and fourth step it is advised the foot to travel along two sides of the box, rather than along its diagonal.

Rhythm varies, e.g., it is "1-2-3,4-5-6" in Waltz and "slow quick quick, slow quick quick" in Rumba.

=== Chaînés / chainé turns / chaines turns ===
French for "chain", a series of quick turns starting from second position going to first position alternating on either flat feet or on relevé with progression along a straight line or circle.

=== Chassé ===
Chassé (French, "to chase") is a dance step with a triple step pattern used in many forms of dance. It is a gliding, flowing step with the feet essentially following a step–together–step pattern. Timing and length of steps vary from dance to dance.

=== Closed change ===
Closed change is a basic step in the waltz. The leader steps forward on either foot whilst the follower steps backward on the opposing foot (e.g.: the leader steps forward on their right foot whilst the follower steps back on their left). Both partners will then step to the side on the other foot, and conclude the figure by closing the first foot beside the second (hence the name "closed" of the step). Each step takes up a full beat of the music.

=== Cross-body lead ===
Cross-body lead is a common and useful move in Latin dances such as salsa, mambo, rumba and cha-cha-cha. Basically, the leader, on counts 2 and 3 of their basic step (assuming dancing on 1), does a quarter-left turn (90° counter-clockwise) while still holding on to the follower. On counts 4 and 5, the follower is led forward across the leader, i.e., firmly led with the leader's right hand on their back, so that the follower travels across to turn and face the opposite direction they were originally facing. At the same time, the leader does another quarter-left turn as necessary in order to follow the follower and face them. At the end of the move, the dancers have their positions exchanged.

The cross-body lead can be done with single-hand or double hand hold, with or without a follower's underarm turn, or leading the follower to do a free spin.

=== Dos-à-dos / dosado ===
Dosado is a circular movement where two people, who are initially facing each other, walk around each other without or almost without turning, i.e., facing in the same direction (same wall) all the time.

=== Double reverse spin ===
The double reverse spin is a full left (counter-clockwise) turn in one measure of music. It is danced in waltz, quickstep and tango.

=== Enchufla ===
This is a dance movement common in salsa, where the two dance partners facing each other change positions. The dance partners keep contact with one or two hands while stepping to rotate concentrically over 180 degrees around the same point in opposite directions.

== F–K ==
=== Feather step ===
The feather step is a basic figure in International Style foxtrot, in which the leader makes three or four steps forward, with the third one (right foot) done outside the follower.

=== Free spin ===
In lead and follow dance, a dance turn performed without partner contact.

=== Gancho ===
"Gancho" means "hook" in Spanish and describes certain "hooking actions" in some dances of Latin American heritage, in Argentine tango (leg action) and salsa (arm action and foot action) in particular.

=== Grapevine ===
The grapevine or vine starts with a side step, then the working leg goes behind, then stepping to the side, then join.

=== Heel pull ===
A variant of the heel turn, in which the feet are kept apart.

=== Heel turn ===
A ballroom dance move, which is the turn on the heel of the support foot while the other foot is held close and parallel to the support one. At the end of the turn the weight is transferred from one foot to the other.

=== Impetus ===
The impetus is a kind of leader's heel turn used in Standard dances. In case of the open impetus, it brings the couple from a closed position into promenade position.

=== Inside partner step ===
A step taken forward into the space occupied by the partner, while the partner steps backwards. During this step feet tracks of both partners overlap. See also outside partner step.

=== Inside turn ===
The term is applied to an individual turn of a partner in the couple. Basically, it denotes a turn where the arm of the partner doing the turn begins by moving towards the "inside" of the couple (the line running from the center of one partner to the center of the other). The meaning is intuitively clear, but it may be performed in numerous ways and in different handholds, so that even accomplished dancers are confused. In dances such as swing and salsa, inside and outside turns most commonly refer to underarm turns done by the follower. Since in these dances the follower's right arm is normally used to lead a turn (most commonly by the leader's left arm, but sometimes by the leader's right arm when a cross-hand or "handshake" position is used), an inside turn is normally a left (counter-clockwise) turn, while an outside turn is a right (clockwise) turn. However, if the follower's left arm is used to initiate the turn, the intended direction of turning may be opposite. (Alternatively, the non-ambiguous terms "left turn" and "right turn" may be used.)

See Direction of movement for more detail.

=== Kick ===
Moving the knee upwards and then quickly kicking downwards with the foot. The ankle is stretched, that is, the toes are pointing down.

== L–R ==
=== Lock step ===
A lock step is an alternative variation of a chassé action which occurs when the moving foot swings to a stop across the track of the standing foot rather than closing next to it. In the Latin dances the combination of the crossed position and the turnout of the feet means that the rear toe will be pointed at the heel of the other foot, while in the Standard dances the lack of turnout means the feet will be parallel. In Standard the basic locking action is usually preceded and followed by a left side lead. The Latin lock step is often featured when cha-cha is danced in open position with a one-hand hold.

=== Moonwalk ===
The moonwalk is a dance technique that presents the illusion of the dancer being pulled backwards while attempting to walk forward, like this

=== Natural turn ===
Natural turns and some other figures are those in which the dance couple rotates to the right (clockwise).

=== Open turn ===
A ballroom dance figure in which during the last step the moving foot passes the support foot, rather than closes to it.

=== Outside partner step ===
A step taken with the partner beside the moving foot (e.g., to the left of the left moving foot). During this step feet tracks of both partners do not overlap. See also inside partner step.

=== Outside turn ===
Cf. Inside turn.

The term is applied to an individual turn of a partner in the couple. Basically, it denotes the lead/follow connection directed "outside" of the center of the spinning individual. Inside and outside terminology can not be determined by relativity to partnership as such position alternates every 180 degrees of rotation. Connection points and application of active side are consistent only with regard to the axis of rotation and direction of spin.

See Direction of movement for more detail.

=== Pirouette ===
A pirouette usually means turning or spinning on one foot while touching the standing leg with the opposite leg in a bent position.

=== Reverse turn ===
Reverse turns and some other figures are those in which the dance couple rotates to the left (counter-clockwise).

=== Ronde ===
See Rond de jambe. A toe of the straight leg draws a semicircle on the floor. In ballroom dances the direction is usually from the front to back.

=== Running man ===
The running man is a dance move in which the person stays in the same place and creates an illusion like a running man by dragging his feet.

== S–Z ==
=== Spin turn ===
The natural spin turn is a common right-turning move in international standard waltz and quickstep. It can be used, for example, to navigate a corner of the ballroom.

=== Sprinkler ===
The sprinkler is a dance move that simulates the motion of a garden irrigation sprinkler.

=== Suzie Q ===
Suzie Q or Suzy Q is a step where the feet perform alternating cross steps and side steps with swivel action.

=== Thunder clap ===
The thunder clap is a form of dance that incorporates clapping in the air with a sliding motion. To perform this dance one must raise one hand and then with the second hand meet the first one half way making a clapping sound; that hand must then fully extend. This motion is repeated to the beat of the music.

=== Time step ===
- In tap dancing, the time step is a recognizable rhythmic tap combination. The term comes from the time of great tap dancers that used their distinctive time step to tell the band the desired tempo. Common tap time steps are classified as single, double and triple. The basic rhythm and tempo remain the same but the number of sounds that happen on the second and sixth count of an eight-count phrase denotes single (often a single step) double (usually a flap or slap-tap) or triple (commonly shuffle-step). While these are the universal time steps, dancers often choose to create their own time steps, following the pattern two bars repeated three times with a two bar break.
- Time steps is a figure in International Style cha-cha-cha.
- In various rhythmic ballroom/social dances, time step sometimes refers to steps in place that mark the characteristic rhythm of the dance, "2-3-cha-cha-cha" for Cha-cha-cha, "1,2,3,4" for pasodoble, "1,2,3,...5,6,7,..." for "salsa on one", etc.

=== Walk ===
The walk is probably the most basic dance move. It exists in almost every dance. Walks approximately correspond normal walking steps, taking into the account the basic technique of the dance in question. (For example, in Latin-dance walks the toe hits the floor first, rather than the heel.)

In dance descriptions the term walk is usually applied when two or more steps are taken in the same direction. A single step, e.g., forward, is called just thus: "step forward".

Walks can be done in various dance positions: in closed position, promenade position, shadow position, sweetheart position, etc.

Curved walks are done along a curve, rather than along a straight line.

=== Whisk ===
The various kinds of whisk are dance moves in International Standard and American Smooth dances. They are characterised by the partners crossing their outside legs behind their inside legs, arriving in promenade position.

=== Wing ===
The wing is a move in waltz and other Standard dances. Both partners take a step forward, and then the lady walks in a half-circle in front of the man from his right to his left side.

=== Worm ===
The worm is a move in which the person makes rhythmic wave like movements lying on the ground.

== See also ==
- Glossary of ballet
- Glossary of partner dance terms
