= Wing (waltz) =

A wing is a ballroom dance move, in the silver syllabus of competition waltz. It is a transitional movement that repositions the follower to the leader's left side. Thus, while many dance moves can precede a wing, only a reverse movement can follow a wing, such as a reverse turn, double reverse spin, Telemark, fallaway reverse, or drag hesitation.

The wing begins with a forward hesitation while leading the woman to take three forward steps to the man's left side. Thus, the next figure will begin in outside partner position, moving into a reverse turn.

== Footwork ==
The wing may be preceded by any type of whisk, a chassé from promenade position, an open Telemark, or an open impetus.

Leader (man)

Beat	Foot position	Alignment	Amount of turn	Footwork
1	Right foot forward and across in promenade position (PP) and contra body movement position (CBMP)	Pointing to line of dance	1/8 between 3 and 1	Heel
2	Left foot start to close to right foot	Towards facing diagonal center	body turn on 2	Pressure on toe of right foot with foot flat, and pressure on inside edge of toe of left foot
3	Left foot closes to right foot without weight	Facing diagonal center	1/8 between 2 and 3	Same as on beat 2

Follower (lady)

Beat	Foot position	Alignment	Amount of turn	Footwork
1	Left foot forward in PP and CBMP	Facing diagonal center	1/8 between 3 and 1	Heel – toe
2	Right foot forward preparing to step outside partner (OP) on left side	Facing center	1/8 between 1 and 2	Toe
3	Left foot forward in CBMP, OP on left side	Backing line of dance, continue to turn to backing diagonal center	1/4 between 2 and 3, then continue to turn body to backing diagonal center	Toe – heel

== Closed wing ==
The closed wing is a Gold syllabus step. Whereas the regular wing ends in an outside partner position, the closed wing ends in closed position. The closed wing may be preceded by a chassé from promenade position or an outside change. It may be followed by a reverse turn or several variations of the whisk.

Leader (man)

Beat	Foot position	Alignment	Amount of turn	Footwork
1	Right foot forward in CBMP, OP	Facing diagonal center		Heel
2	Left foot starts to close to right foot	Facing diagonal center	Slight body turn to left on 2 and 3	Whole right foot, pressure on inside edge of toe of left foot
3	Left foot closes to right foot without weight	Facing diagonal center		Whole right foot, pressure on inside edge of toe of left foot

Follower (lady)

Beat	Foot position	Alignment	Amount of turn	Footwork
1	Left foot back in CBMP	Backing diagonal center		Toe – heel
2	Right foot to side and slightly back (small step)	Backing diagonal center		Toe
3	Left foot forward in CBMP, OP on left side	Facing diagonal wall against line of dance	Slight body turn to left	Toe – heel
