= V6 (quickstep) =

V6 is a silver level dance pattern of the quickstep International Standard Ballroom dance syllabus. The couple moves diagonally to the center (DC) and then diagonally to the wall (DW), thus sweeping a V-shape on the floor.

== Footwork ==
The pattern starts with the leader backing DC, e.g., after the first part of the quarter turns: the back lock (SQQS) is performed, followed by the change of the direction on counts SQQ (leader's steps: left foot back (follower steps outside partner), right foot back with a quarter turn to the left, left foot forward facing DW), followed by a slow step outside partner, e.g., into the forward lock (SQQS). Essentially a back lock followed by an outside change.

Leader

Step #	Timing	Foot position	Alignment	Footwork
1	Slow	Left foot back	Backing DC	Toe – heel
2	Quick	Right foot back right side leading	Backing DC	Toe
3	Quick	Left foot crosses in front of right foot	Backing DC	Toe
4	Slow	Right foot back	Backing DC	Toe – heel
5	Slow	Left foot back in CBMP	Backing DC	Toe – heel
6	Quick	Right foot back	Backing DC	Toe
7	Quick	Left foot to side and slightly forward	Pointing DW	Toe – heel
8	Slow	Right foot forward in CBMP, OP	Facing DW	Heel

Follower

Step #	Timing	Foot position	Alignment	Footwork
1	Slow	Right foot forward	Facing DC	Heel – toe
2	Quick	Left foot forward left side leading	Facing DC	Toe
3	Quick	Right foot crosses behind left foot	Facing DC	Toe
4	Slow	Left foot forward, preparing to step OP	Facing DC	Toe – heel
5	Slow	Right foot forward in CBMP, OP	Facing DC	Heel – toe
6	Quick	Left foot forward	Facing DC	Toe
7	Quick	Right foot to side and slightly back	Backing DW	Toe – heel
8	Slow	Left foot back in CBMP	Backing DW	Toe

== Preceding and following figures ==
Possible preceding figures: Anything ending with leader's weight on left foot, backing diagonal centre - such as:

- "SQQ" of the quarter turns
- Natural spin turn (SQQSSS) ending DC, the last S being the first S of the V6.

Possible following figures: Anything beginning with the leader's step on right foot outside partner, such as:

- Forward lock step
- Forward pepperpot
- Left scatter chasses
