= International standard waltz =

International Style dance category

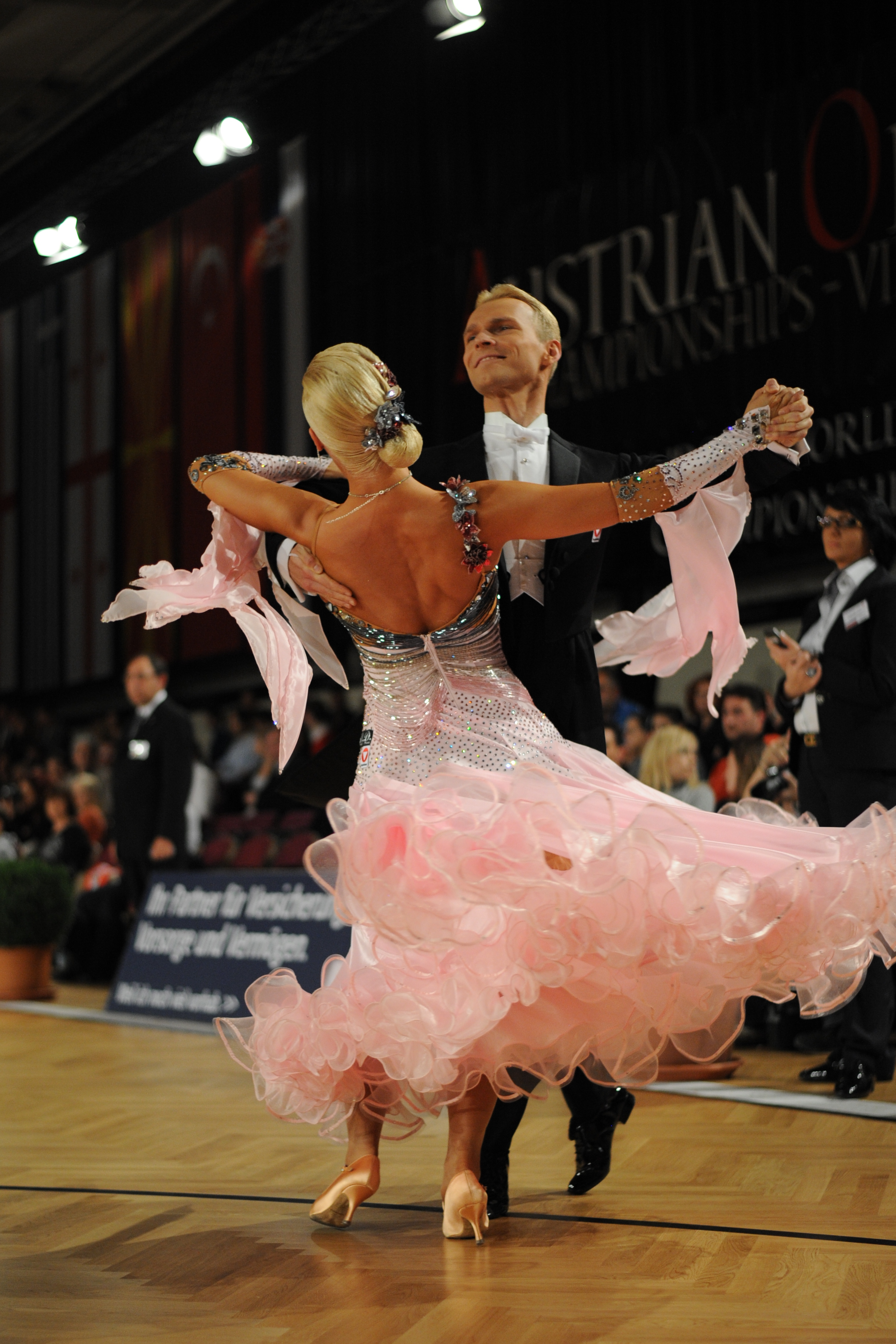
Waltz

Waltz is one of the five dances in the Standard (or Modern) category of the International Style ballroom dances. It was previously referred to as slow waltz or English waltz.

Waltz is usually the first dance in the dancesport competition rounds. It is danced exclusively in the closed position, unlike its American Style counterpart.

== History ==
The Waltz originated as a folk dance from Austria. Predecessors include the matenick and a variation called the furiant that were performed during rural festivals in Bohemia. The French dance, "Walt", and the Austrian Ländler are the most similar to the waltz among its predecessors.

The "king of dances" acquired different national traits in different countries. Thus there appeared the English waltz, the Hungarian waltz, and the waltz-mazurka. The word "waltz" is derived from the old German word "walzen" meaning "to roll, turn", or "to glide". Waltz has been danced competitively since 1923 or 1924.

== Music ==
International Standard Waltz is a waltz dance and danced to slow waltz music, preferably 28 to 30 bars per minute (84 to 90 beats per minute). Waltz music is in 3/4 time and the first beat of a measure is strongly accented.

== Character ==
Like all Standard category dances, waltz is a progressive dance, meaning that dancers travel along a path known as the line of dance, that is counter-clockwise around the floor. It is characterized by pendulum swing movements and incorporates general elements of ballroom technique such as foot parallelism, rise and fall, contra body movement and sway.

Figures can have one step per beat (three per measure) but also four, five or six steps per measure. The faster pace of the latter, especially when combined with dance turns, results in fast-paced, dynamic dancing despite the relatively slow music tempo.

== Syllabus ==
This is the Imperial Society of Teachers of Dancing (ISTD) International Standard syllabus.

=== Pre-Bronze ===
Note that Pre-Bronze is included as part of the Bronze syllabus.

1. Closed changes
2. Natural turn
3. Reverse turn
4. Natural spin turn
5. Whisk
6. Chassé from promenade position

=== Bronze ===
7. Closed impetus
8. Hesitation change
9. Outside change
10. Reverse corte
11. Back whisk
12. Basic weave
13. Double reverse spin
14. Reverse pivot
15. Back lock
16. Progressive chassé to right

=== Silver ===
17. Weave from promenade position
18. Closed Telemark
19. Open Telemark and cross hesitation
20. Open Telemark and wing
21. Open impetus and cross hesitation
22. Open impetus and wing
23. Outside spin
24. Turning lock

xx. Drag hesitation

=== Gold ===
25. Left whisk
26. Contra check
27. Closed wing
28. Turning lock to right
29. Fallaway reverse and slip pivot
30. Hover corte

xx. Fallaway whisk

== See also ==
- Viennese waltz
- Foxtrot
- Boston (dance)
- Waltz
