= Telemark (waltz) =

Ballroom dance move

The Telemark is a ballroom dance step; in waltz competition, it is in the Silver syllabus. Telemarks are reverse turns where the follower (the lady) does a heel turn as the leader (the man) travels around her. There are similar Telemarks in foxtrot and quickstep.

The term Telemark is borrowed from skiing, in which a turn is generated by a forward leg motion. The closed Telemark and open Telemark are fairly similar. However, the closed Telemark ends in closed position, while the open Telemark ends in promenade position.

The closed Telemark can be followed by a natural turn, natural spin turn, hesitation change, or forward lock.

The open Telemark can be followed by an open natural turn, a chassé from promenade position, cross hesitation, wing, or left whisk from promenade position.
