= Victor Silvester =

English dancer and musician (1900–1978)

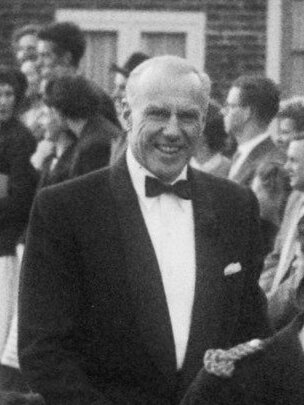
Silvester in 1959

Victor Marlborough Silvester (25 February 1900 – 14 August 1978) was an English dancer, writer, musician and bandleader from the British dance band era. He was a significant figure in the development of ballroom dance during the first half of the 20th century, and his records sold 75 million copies from the 1930s through to the 1980s.

== Early life ==
Silvester was born the second son of a vicar in Wembley, Middlesex, England. He was educated at Ardingly College, St. John's School, Leatherhead and John Lyon School, Harrow, from all of which he absconded.

Silvester claimed that he enlisted in the British Army on 4 September 1916, during the First World War, serving as a private in the Argyll and Sutherland Highlanders, and that he lied about his age to the recruiting authorities, stating this as 20 whereas he was only 16. He supposedly took part in the Battle of Arras in April/May 1917, and said he was a member of five execution squads, where deserters were shot.

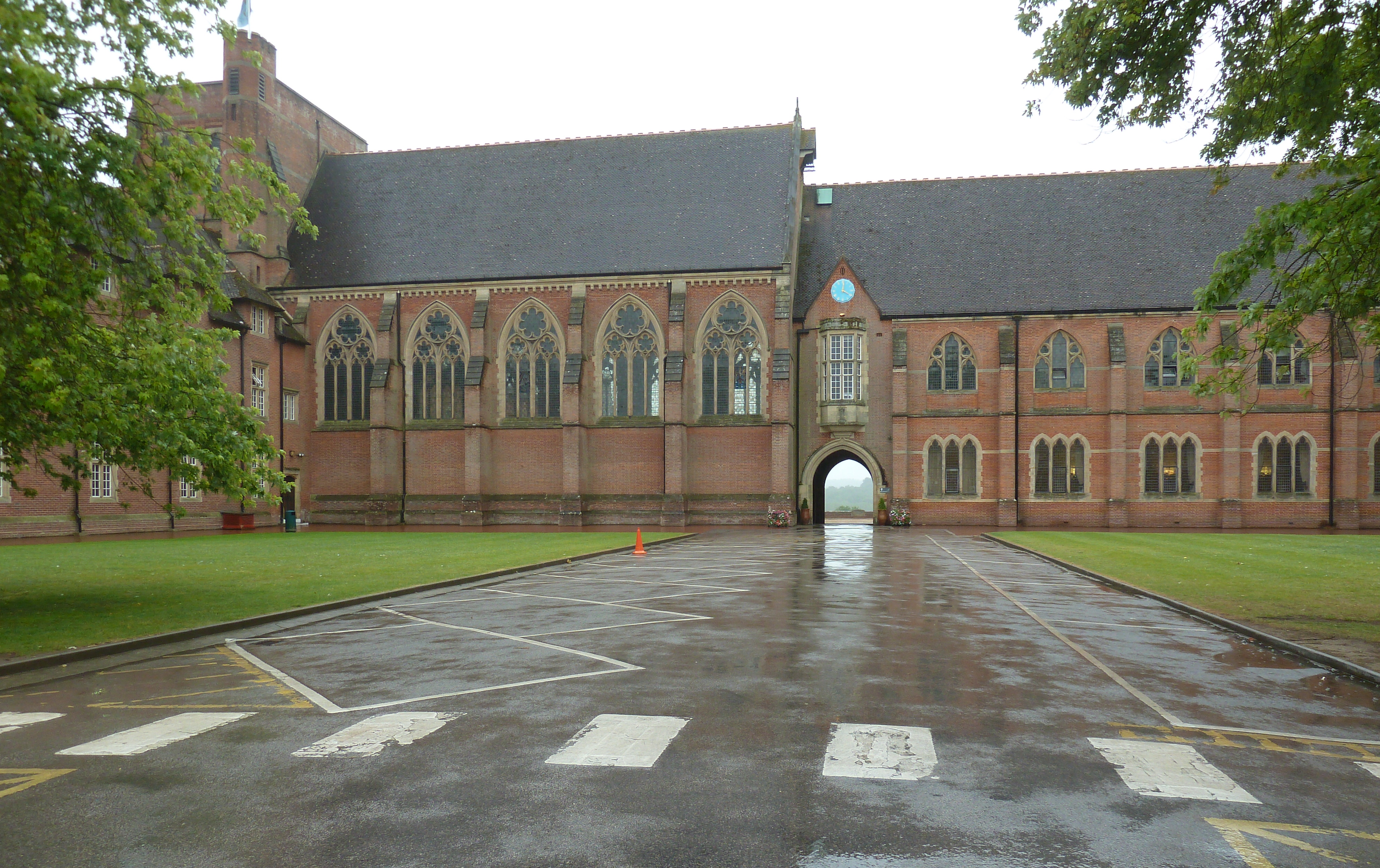
Ardingly College

However, the release of his service records in 2000 revealed that he had been discharged from the Argyll and Sutherland Highlanders as underage on 12 September 1916, after just a week of service. However, he immediately joined the First Aid Services (i.e. the Red Cross and St John Ambulance), and served with them in France from 1 October 1916 to June 1917, before transferring to the First British Ambulance Unit For Italy. On 4 September 1917 at Sella di Dol near San Gabriele, while acting as a stretcher bearer to evacuate wounded Italian servicemen during a heavy bombardment by the Austrians and Germans, he was injured in the leg by a shell burst, but refused medical treatment until the other wounded had been attended to. For his gallantry on this occasion he was awarded the Italian Bronze Medal of Military Valour in a decree by the Italian Minister of War dated 30 November 1917. In a letter to Silvester's parents dated 20 September 1917, his Commandant in the First British Ambulance Unit, the noted historian G. M. Trevelyan, wrote: "He is certainly one who will be deservedly loved wherever he goes in life, and he is besides made of sterling stuff."

After the war he studied at Worcester College, Oxford for a year. He decided to resume a military career when he was offered a place at the Royal Military College, Sandhurst, but he quickly decided it was not for him. He also studied music at Trinity College, London, having already had private piano lessons as a child.

== Career in dance ==
His interests had meanwhile turned to dancing. He was one of the first post-war English dancers to feature the full natural turn in the slow waltz. This innovation was a factor in his winning the first World Ballroom Dancing Championship in 1922 with Phyllis Clarke as his partner. He married Dorothy Newton a few days later.

He competed again in 1924, coming second to Maxwell Stewart – the inventor of the double reverse spin in the waltz – and Barbara Miles. He was a founding member of the Ballroom Committee of the Imperial Society of Teachers of Dancing which codified the theory and practice of Ballroom Dance – now known as the International Style – and published the first book embodying the new standards in 1927. This was Modern Ballroom Dancing, which became a best-seller and has remained in print through many editions, the last issued in 2005.

He went on to open a dancing academy in London, which eventually developed into a chain of 23 dance studios. By the early 1930s, his teaching had become famous and he had taught some of the top celebrities of the day, among whom was Merle Oberon. Silvester had his own BBC television show through the 1950s, called BBC Dancing Club, and was later the President of the Imperial Society of Teachers of Dancing.

== Career in music ==
The lack of what he felt were adequate records for dancing led Silvester in 1935 to form his own five-piece band, later enlarged and named Victor Silvester and his Ballroom Orchestra, whose first record, "You're Dancing on My Heart" (by Al Bryan and George M. Meyer), sold 17,000 copies and was to become his signature tune. He insisted his recordings conform precisely to the beats per minute recommended by the ISTD for ballroom dances, a concept termed "strict tempo". In British eyes he became indelibly associated with the catch-phrase "slow, slow, quick-quick-slow" – a rhythm that occurs in the foxtrot and quickstep.

The Silvester band always had a distinctive sound, achieved by an unusual line-up including, as well as the usual rhythm section, alto saxophone (initially Charlie Spinelli and later, for 26 years, Edward Owen "Poggy" Pogson, who had previously played in Jack Payne's and Jack Hylton's bands), a lead solo violin (for many years usually Oscar Grasso), and two pianos, one taking turn in solos and the other maintaining an improvised tinkling continuo in the background throughout every piece, which Silvester called his "lemonade". This piano sound is said to have been created for him by the pianist and later bandleader, and BBC radio star, Felix King.

He notes in his autobiography that his first two pianists in 1935 were Gerry Moore for the melody and Felix King for the "lemonade". Later pianists included, at different times, Monia Liter (from 1940 to 1944), Charlie Pude, Jack Phillips, Billy Munn, Victor Parker (also accordion), Ernest "Slim" Wilson (who was also Silvester's main arranger, and with whom he co-wrote several pieces), Eddie Macauley and Ronnie Taylor. Silvester's drummer for over four decades was Ben Edwards, crucial for supplying the strict tempo. Sometimes there might be four saxophones altogether, two alto and two tenor, including in latter years Tony Mozr, Percy Waterhouse and Phil Kirby in addition to Pogson, all doubling on clarinet as required. On some recordings, the Ballroom Orchestra was augmented with 15 strings and woodwind, when it became 'The Silver Strings'. During the war, when Oscar Grasso was in the forces, the classical violinist Alfredo Campoli took his place, using the name 'Alfred Campbell' for contractual reasons.

These were first-class players, some of whom (like Liter, Grasso and Pogson) were already noted in jazz or danceband circles before they joined Silvester's band. Unlike most British dance bands of the era, there were no vocals. Silvester usually did not play (he was a violinist), but stood in front of his orchestra in white tie and tails, conducting with a flourish.

He continued to make music for half a century, mostly covering the popular music standards and show tunes, sometimes (but rarely) swing, trad jazz and in latter years, especially from 1971 when the orchestra continued under his son, Victor Silvester Jr, rock and roll, disco and pop. These later attempts to stay "with it" involved the introduction of an electric guitar, but it is mostly the more melodic recordings of the 1940s and 1950s that are now reissued on CD.

== Competition ==
Silvester's record sales were so high that competition was inevitable. Other dancers were attracted to the idea, and set up their own strict-tempo bands. Henry Jacques, Maxwell Stewart, Josephine Bradley and Wally Fryer were all top-flight dancers who set up in competition to Silvester. There were other bands led by musicians who were capable of recording in strict time. The best for ballroom competitions was probably Joe Loss, who had an even longer musical career than Silvester. Other bands that catered to ballroom dancing were Oscar Rabin and Jack Harris, whose band played in clubs and restaurants through the 1930s, Phil Tate, and Jack Parnell. For the post-war period of Latin dances to (mostly) Cuban and Brazilian rhythms, Edmundo Ros was in a class of his own.

== Later life ==
By 1958, when he published his autobiography, he was the most successful dance band leader in British musical history, and a major star on British radio and television. His BBC Television show Dancing Club lasted 17 years. He also presented a weekly request programme on the BBC Overseas Service (later World Service) which ran from 1948 to 1975. His obituary in The Times noted, "Turn on a radio in Famagusta, Cape Town or Peking and one would be likely to hear his music issuing from the speakers".

He was the subject of This Is Your Life in 1957 when he was surprised by Eamonn Andrews at the BBC Television Theatre. The "red book" and the Andrews script book he was presented with were restored by bookbinder Christopher Shaw, in an episode of The Repair Shop broadcast on 5 January 2023.

Silvester was appointed an Officer of the Order of the British Empire in 1961. He died while on holiday in the south of France, at the age of 78. The orchestra remained in existence under his son's direction until the 1990s. Victor, his wife and son are memorialised at Golders Green Crematorium, London.

The Victor Silvester Archive - which includes his OBE and First World War medals and related original documents and correspondence, his many other accolades such as his four Carl Alan Awards for services to dancing and his BBC Radio Golden Microphone Award, platinum and silver discs for his orchestra's record sales, photographs, his volumes of newspaper cuttings, the complete archive of programme sheets for his orchestra's BBC broadcasts and the orchestra's entire archive of original hand-scored strict tempo sheet music - was sold at auction in London in March 2000 and since then has been held by a private collector in the North-East of England.

== Bibliography ==
- Victor Silvester, Modern Ballroom Dancing, London: Herbert Jenkins, 1927 - many editions (about 60 in his lifetime). First edition included waltz, foxtrot, quickstep and tango, plus mention of blues, one-step, black bottom and paso doble. In the Second World War and after, there was some space given to such as samba, rumba, "rhythm dance" (a way for beginners to get round the ballroom) and "quick waltz" (= Viennese waltz). Editions in the mid-1950s would have included the jive and cha-cha-cha. By 1977, the book included the full set of ten dances used in international competitions, plus rock n' roll and disco dance (brief notes only). Recent edition: London: Ebury, 2005 edition, revised and augmented by Bryn Allen: ISBN 0-09-190509-5.
- Victor Silvester, Theory and Technique of Ballroom Dancing. London: Herbert Jenkins, 1932; 2nd ed 1933 and other editions.
- Victor Silvester (with foreword by Philip J. S. Richardson), The Art of the Ballroom. London: Herbert Jenkins, 1936.
- Victor Silvester, Old Time Dancing. Herbert Jenkins, London. 1949 and later editions.
- Victor Silvester, Dancing for the Millions: A concise guide to modern ballroom dancing. London: Odhams Press, 1949.
- Victor Silvester Sequence Dancing. London: Herbert Jenkins, 1950, and later editions.
- Victor Silvester, More Old Time Dances. London: Herbert Jenkins, 1951.
- Victor Silvester, Modern Dancers' Handbook. London: Herbert Jenkins, 1954.
- Victor Silvester, c.1955. Victor Silvester's Album.
- Victor Silvester, Dancing Is My Life: The Autobiography of Victor Silvester. London: Heinemann, 1958.
- Walter Whitman and Victor Silvester, The Complete Old Time Dancer. London: Herbert Jenkins, 1967.
- Victor Silvester, Modern Ballroom Dancing: History and Practice. London: Barrie and Jenkins, 1977.
- Victor Silvester, Old Time and Sequence Dancing. London: Barrie and Jenkins, 1980.

Also published were sheet music arrangements.
