= Lock step (dance move) =

Dance steps in which the standing foot blocks the moving foot

Lock step refers to any of several dance steps that involves the "locking" of the moving foot: the moving foot approaches to the standing foot, crosses in front of or behind it in the direction of the approach, stops close to the standing foot, and the weight is fully transferred to the (previously) moving foot.

The closeness of the feet so that the lower legs of the dancer are "locked" together crossed is the main difference from other cross-steps used, e.g., in the grapevine, where the moving (crossing) foot travels away from the standing foot and the lower legs are separated. In the whisk the crossing foot travels around the standing foot, rather than "locks" from the direction of approach.

The term "lock step" or simply "lock" may be applied either to a single "locking" step or to a whole step pattern, e.g., of three steps, such as "step diagonally forward, lock behind, step diagonally forward". The footwork varies depending on the actual dance figure.

Lock steps are common in the quickstep.

Among the basic figures of Argentine tango there is a similar "la cruzada" ("crossing) position of the legs.

== Ballroom dance figures ==
There are several dance figures with names involving the words "lock" or "lock step", as well as several figures that use the lock as part of the pattern.

- Back lock
- Forward lock
- Turning lock
- Curving lock
- Skip lock
- Syncopated lock (single or double)
- Samba locks
- Cruzados locks
- The Six Quick Lock
- Double lock
- Forward checked lock
- Reverse turns in Viennese waltz
- Fishtail
- In cha-cha-cha, advanced variations of basic figures may involve replacement of the cha-cha-cha chassés with lock steps.
- Some triple steps in West Coast Swing may be stylized into lock-steps.
