= Lock (waltz) =

Dance step

There are several types of lock step in waltz dancing, including International Standard waltz. A "lock step" is when the moving foot approaches to the standing foot and crosses in front of or behind it, creating a "check" position.

There are several locking steps in waltz, including: the back lock, which is a Bronze syllabus figure; the turning lock, of the Silver syllabus; and the turning lock to right, of the Gold syllabus.

== Back lock ==
The back lock is a Bronze syllabus step. It is a progressive figure borrowed from quickstep. It is commonly used as the ending to a progressive chassé to right.

Leader (man)

Beat	Foot position	Alignment	Amount of turn	Footwork
1	Left foot back in contra body movement position (CBMP)	Backing diagonal wall		Toe – heel
2 (1/2 beat)	Right foot back	Backing diagonal wall		Toe
& (1/2 beat)	Left foot crosses in front of right foot	Backing diagonal wall		Toe
3	Right foot diagonally back	Backing diagonal wall		Toe – heel

Follower (lady)

Beat	Foot position	Alignment	Amount of turn	Footwork
1	Right foot forward in CBMP, outside partner (OP)	Facing diagonal wall		Heel – toe
2 (1/2 beat)	Left foot diagonally forward	Facing diagonal wall		Toe
& (1/2 beat)	Right foot crosses behind left foot	Facing diagonal wall		Toe
3	Left foot diagonally forward	Facing diagonal wall		Toe – heel

== Forward lock ==
The forward lock is the same figure as the back lock, only with reversed roles between leader and follower.

== Turning lock ==
The turning lock is a Silver syllabus step. It transitions from a right turning figure into a left-turning one.

Leader (man)

Beat	Foot position	Alignment	Amount of turn	Footwork
1 (1/2 beat)	Right foot back, right side leading	Backing diagonal center		Toe
& (1/2 beat)	Left foot crosses in front of right foot	Backing diagonal center		Toe
2	Right foot back and slightly right	Backing diagonal center	Start to turn left	Toe
3	Left foot to side and slightly forward	Pointing diagonal wall	1/4 between 2 and 3, body turns less	Toe – heel
1	Right foot forward in CBMP, OP	Facing diagonal wall		Heel

Follower (lady)

Beat	Foot position	Alignment	Amount of turn	Footwork
1 (1/2 beat)	Left foot forward, left side leading	Facing diagonal center		Toe
& (1/2 beat)	Right foot crosses behind left foot	Facing diagonal center		Toe
2	Left foot forward and slightly left	Facing diagonal center	Start to turn left	Toe
3	Right foot to side and slightly back	Backing diagonal wall	1/4 between 2 and 3, body turns less	Toe – heel
1	Left foot back in CBMP	Backing diagonal wall		Toe

== Turning lock to right ==
The turning lock to right is a Gold syllabus step. It was only added to the ISTD syllabus after 1966, due to its increasing popularity.

Leader (man)

Beat	Foot position	Alignment	Amount of turn	Footwork
1 (1/2 beat)	Right foot back right side leading	Backing line of dance		Toe
& (1/2 beat)	Left foot crosses loosely in front of right foot	Facing center	1/4 to right between 1 and "&"	Toe
2	Right foot to side and slightly forward, small step, between partner's feet	Facing diagonal center	1/8 between "&" and 2	Toe
3	Left foot diagonal forward, left side leading in promenade position (PP)	Pointing diagonal center, body facing line of dance	Slight body turn to right	Toe – heel

Follower (lady)

Beat	Foot position	Alignment	Amount of turn	Footwork
1 (1/2 beat)	Left foot forward, left side leading	Facing line of dance		Toe
& (1/2 beat)	Right foot crosses loosely behind left foot	Backing center	1/4 to right between 1 and "&"	Toe
2	Left foot to side and slightly back	Backing diagonal center	1/8 between "&" and 2	Toe
3	Right foot to side in PP, having brushed towards left foot	Pointing to center, moving diagonal center	3/8 between 2 and 3, body turns less	Toe – heel
