= Jenkka =

Finnish partner dance

Jenkka (Finnish pronunciation: [ˈjeŋkːɑ]) is a fast Finnish partner dance found in Finnish folk dance, the Finnish version of the schottische. It is danced to music in 2/4 or 4/4 time signature, with about 140 beats per minute. The dance arose in the mid-19th century, and was being danced in rural areas in the 1960s.

Men and women do similar steps. The initial dance position is with the man to the left of the woman both facing in the direction of the line of dance, with their inner arms on each other's waists. The dancers go forward in a run similar to that of the polka: "left-right-left-hop (on the left foot)", "right-left-right-hop". After that they join the free arms, assume the face-to-face closed dance position and proceed with the chain of pivot turns stepping "left-right-left-right" or "left-hop-right-hop". The runs of similar steps are normally started at the beginnings of musical phrases.

Finnish actor and musician Georg Malmstén composed many jenkkas.

== See also ==
- Letkajenkka
