= Spotting (dance technique) =

Type of dance technique

A dancer spotting towards the viewer while performing fouettés

Spotting is a technique used by dancers during the execution of various dance turns. The goal of spotting is to attain a constant orientation of the dancer's head and eyes, to the extent possible, in order to enhance the dancer's control and prevent dizziness.

As a dancer turns, spotting is performed by rotating the body and head at different rates. While the body rotates smoothly at a relatively constant speed, the head periodically rotates much faster and then stops, so as to fix the dancer's gaze on a single location (the spotting point, or simply the spot). Dancers will sometimes focus on an actual visual spot if one is available (e.g., a light or other object), but if no suitable object is available they will attempt to end each head rotation in a consistent orientation. The spotting point may be another dancer, in which case the spot may move.

== Usage ==
Spotting is advantageous for dancers in several ways:

- it prevents dizziness by providing a fixed focus for the eyes,
- the fixed focus also helps the dancer control balance,
- it helps the dancer control the direction of travel during traveling turns such as chaînés and piqués.

Spotting technique is employed for many types of turns, including pirouettes and chaînés. It is deliberately avoided in some types of turns, however. For example, adagio turns — in which the aesthetics are intended to convey serenity and calm — would be disturbed by the abrupt head movements of spotting. Turns in adagio style include turns in arabesque or attitude positions.

In some cases multiple spots may be used during a turn. For example, during a Salsa cross-body lead with inside turn, the lady spots away from her partner to control travel and then spots on her partner to control the stop of rotation.

=== In video games ===
An adaptation of spotting is used in first person video games to avoid simulation sickness caused by scenery changes that are uncorrelated with body movement. For example, a visible crosshair or targeting reticle is provided in Mirror's Edge as a spotting reference point.

== Dance notation ==
In Labanotation, spotting is recorded as a face sign followed by the "spot hold" sign, which is a diamond shape (◊) with a dot in the center.
