= Whisk (ballroom dance) =

The whisk is a ballroom dance step used in the waltz and American style Viennese waltz. It is one of several ways to get into promenade position and is used to turn dancers around corners or change their direction on the dance floor. It can be performed after a reverse turn.

== Basic whisk ==
As in most waltz steps, the body rises starting at the end of the second beat and lowers on the end of the third. There is a sway to the left from the man's point of view, starting on the second beat.

Leader (man)

Beat	Foot position	Alignment	Amount of turn	Footwork
1	Left foot forward	Facing diagonal wall	None	Heel – toe
2	Right foot to side and slightly forward	Facing diagonal wall	Slight body turn to right between 1 and 2	Toe
3	Left foot crosses behind right foot into promenade position (PP)	Facing diagonal wall	None	Toe – heel

Follower (lady)

Beat	Foot position	Alignment	Amount of turn	Footwork
1	Right foot back	Backing diagonal wall	None	Toe – heel
2	Left foot diagonally back	Pointing diagonal center	1/4 between 1 and 2, body turns slightly less	Toe
3	Right foot crosses behind left foot into PP	Facing diagonal center, body turned slightly to left	None	Toe – heel

== Back whisk ==
The back whisk is a variation on the basic whisk. It is very similar to the basic whisk except that it progresses backward rather than forward.

Leader (man)

Beat	Foot position	Alignment	Amount of turn	Footwork
1	Left foot back in contra body movement position (CBMP)	Backing diagonal center against line of dance (LOD)	None	Toe – heel
2	Right foot diagonally back	Backing diagonal center against LOD	None	Toe
3	Left foot crosses behind right foot into PP	Facing diagonal wall	None	Toe – heel

Follower (lady)

Beat	Foot position	Alignment	Amount of turn	Footwork
1	Right foot forward in CBMP	Facing diagonal center against LOD	Begin to turn right	Heel – toe
2	Left foot to side	Facing center	1/8 between 1 and 2	Toe
3	Right foot crosses behind left foot into PP	Facing diagonal center	1/8 between 2 and 3	Toe – heel

== Left whisk ==
The left whisk is a Gold syllabus variation on the whisk. There are at least three versions of the left whisk. One begins in promenade position with the couple moving forward on the first beat. The second starts in closed position with the man moving backward on the right foot. The third is a left whisk on the first beat.

=== Left whisk from promenade position ===
Leader (man)

Beat	Foot position	Alignment	Amount of turn	Footwork
1	Right foot forward and across in PP and CBMP	Facing diagonal wall, moving along line of dance		Heel
2	Left foot to side and slightly forward	Pointing diagonal wall	Body start to turn left	Toe – heel
3	Right foot crosses behind left foot	Facing diagonal wall	Body turn to left	Toe

Follower (lady)

Beat	Foot position	Alignment	Amount of turn	Footwork
1	Left foot forward and across in PP and CBMP	Facing diagonal center, moving along line of dance	Start to turn left	Heel – toe
2	Right foot to side and slightly back	Backing diagonal wall	1/4 between 1 and 2	Toe – heel
3	Left foot back in CBMP	Backing line of dance	1/8 between 2 and 3	Toe – heel
