= Step change (disambiguation) =

A step change produces a step response by controls

Step change may also refer to:

- a change in step on a step function
- a positional change from a stepper motor
- paradigm shift or step change; a dramatic change in circumstances
- StepChange, a British debt charity

== See also ==
- change step
- Change (disambiguation)
- Step (disambiguation)
