= Telemark (disambiguation) =

Telemark is a county in Norway, the name originally referred to Upper Telemark.

Telemark may also refer to:

- Telemark cattle, an old Norwegian breed of cow
- Telemark Battalion, a Norwegian Army Mechanized Infantry unit
- Telemark skiing, a skiing technique
  - Telemark landing, a ski jumping technique
- Telemark Lodge in northern Wisconsin
- The Telemark Operation, a World War II covert mission for Norwegian heavy water sabotage
  - The Heroes of Telemark, a 1965 film about the sabotage
- Telemark (waltz), a ballroom dance step
- TeleMark, an EEMBC embedded computing performance benchmark
