= Heel turn =

Heel turn may refer to:

- In ballroom dance, when one heel is turned while the other is kept stationary; see Glossary of dance moves#Heel turn
- In professional wrestling, when a hero (or "face") transitions into a villain (or "heel"); see Glossary of professional wrestling terms#turn
