= Whisk (disambiguation) =

A whisk is a kitchen utensil.

Whisk may also refer to:

- Fly-whisk, used as a flyswatter or as regalia
- Whisk broom, a kind of broom, a cleaning instrument
- Whisk (ballroom dance), a ballroom dance step used in waltz

See also

- IBM/Apache's OpenWhisk
