= Chassé (waltz) =

Waltz ballroom dance figure

The chassé ([ʃase], French for 'to chase'; sometimes anglicized to chasse /ʃæˈseɪ, ʃæs/) is a waltz ballroom dance figure. Like chassés in other dances, it involves a triple-step where one foot "chases" the other in a "step-together-step" pattern. It is derived from a ballet step.

== Chassé from promenade position ==
The chassé from promenade position is a Pre-Bronze syllabus figure.

Leader (man)

Beat	Foot position	Alignment	Amount of turn	Footwork
1	Right foot forward, across in promenade position (PP) and contra body movement position (CBMP)	Facing diagonal wall, moving line of dance		Heel – toe
2 (1/2 beat)	Left foot to side and slightly forward	Facing diagonal wall		Toe
& (1/2 beat)	Right foot closes to left foot	Facing diagonal wall		Toe
3	Left foot to side and slightly forward	Facing diagonal wall		Toe – heel
1	Right foot forward in CBMP, outside partner	Facing diagonal wall		Heel

Follower (lady)

Beat	Foot position	Alignment	Amount of turn	Footwork
1	Left foot forward, across in PP and CBMP	Facing diagonal center, moving LOD	Starts to turn left	Heel – toe
2 (1/2 beat)	Right foot to side	Backing wall	1/8 between 1 and 2	Toe
& (1/2 beat)	Left foot closes to right foot	Backing diagonal wall	1/8 between 2 and 3, body turns less	Toe
3	Right foot to side and slightly back	Backing diagonal wall		Toe – heel
1	Left foot back in CBMP	Backing diagonal wall		Toe

== Progressive chassé to right ==
The progressive chassé to right is a Bronze syllabus figure. It is progressive because it begins with a forward step. While it moves to the leader's right, it is a reverse, or left-turning figure.

Leader (man)

Beat	Foot position	Alignment	Amount of turn	Footwork
1	Left foot forward	Facing diagonal center	Start to turn left	Heel – toe
2 (1/2 beat)	Right foot to side	Backing wall	1/8 between 1 and 2	Toe
& (1/2 beat)	Left foot closes to right foot	Backing diagonal wall	1/8 between 2 and 3, body turns less	Toe
3	Right foot to side and slightly back	Backing diagonal wall		Toe – heel
1	Left foot back in CBMP	Backing diagonal wall		Toe

Follower (lady)

Beat	Foot position	Alignment	Amount of turn	Footwork
1	Right foot back	Backing diagonal center	Start to turn left	Toe – heel
2 (1/2 beat)	Left foot to side	Pointing diagonal wall	1/4 between 1 and 2, body turns less	Toe
& (1/2 beat)	Right foot closes to left foot	Facing diagonal wall	slight body turn	Toe
3	Left foot to side and slightly forward	Facing diagonal wall		Toe – heel
1	Right foot forward in CBMP, outside partner	Facing diagonal wall		Heel
