= Impetus =

Impetus may refer to:

- A source of motivation
- Theory of impetus, a concept similar to inertia and momentum
- Impetus (album), a 1997 re-release of the EP Passive Restraints
- Impetus (waltz), a ballroom dance step
