= Chicken walks =

Dance move

Chicken walks is a dance move that is most frequently used in swing dances, such as East Coast Swing, West Coast Swing and jive. Sometimes they can be seen incorporated in samba (where they are known as "plaits").

The chicken walks steps are similar from both feet. The basic way of performing chicken walks may be described as follows.

Initial position: knees slightly bent, weight on one, say, left foot.

- On count 1, slide the moving (right) foot straight forward without weight, while turning hips and shoulders to the right (kind of contra body movement). The right toe is in contact with the floor all the time.
- On count 2, transfer the weight onto the right foot (keeping knees bent), at the same time do the same what was described on count 1, but with opposite feet.
- Repeat

The basic chicken walks may be styled into a great variety of moves:

- the dancer may lean backwards;
- the walks may be done with kind of charleston bobbing;
- the support foot may swivel at the moment of weight transfer *in* the direction of the forthcoming body turn;
- as a result of the swivels just described, the steps may be done in outward-diagonal directions, etc.

Chicken walks are almost never done by both partners simultaneously. Almost always, the follower does the chicken while the leader leads.

Dance connection may vary.

- The leader may walk backwards pretending that they are pulling the follower, while the follower is doing chicken walks.
- Assuming the shadow position (with any handhold), the leader leads the follower into chicken walks.
- The leader does chicken walks while the follower pretends to push the leader from behind while doing swivel walks.
