= Free spin =

Free spin may refer to:

- A dance move, see Glossary of dance moves § Free spin
- A type of 4D rollercoaster by S&S Worldwide, see 4th Dimension roller coaster § S&S Free Spin
- A type of bonus in slot machines
