= Mayim Mayim =

Israeli folk dance

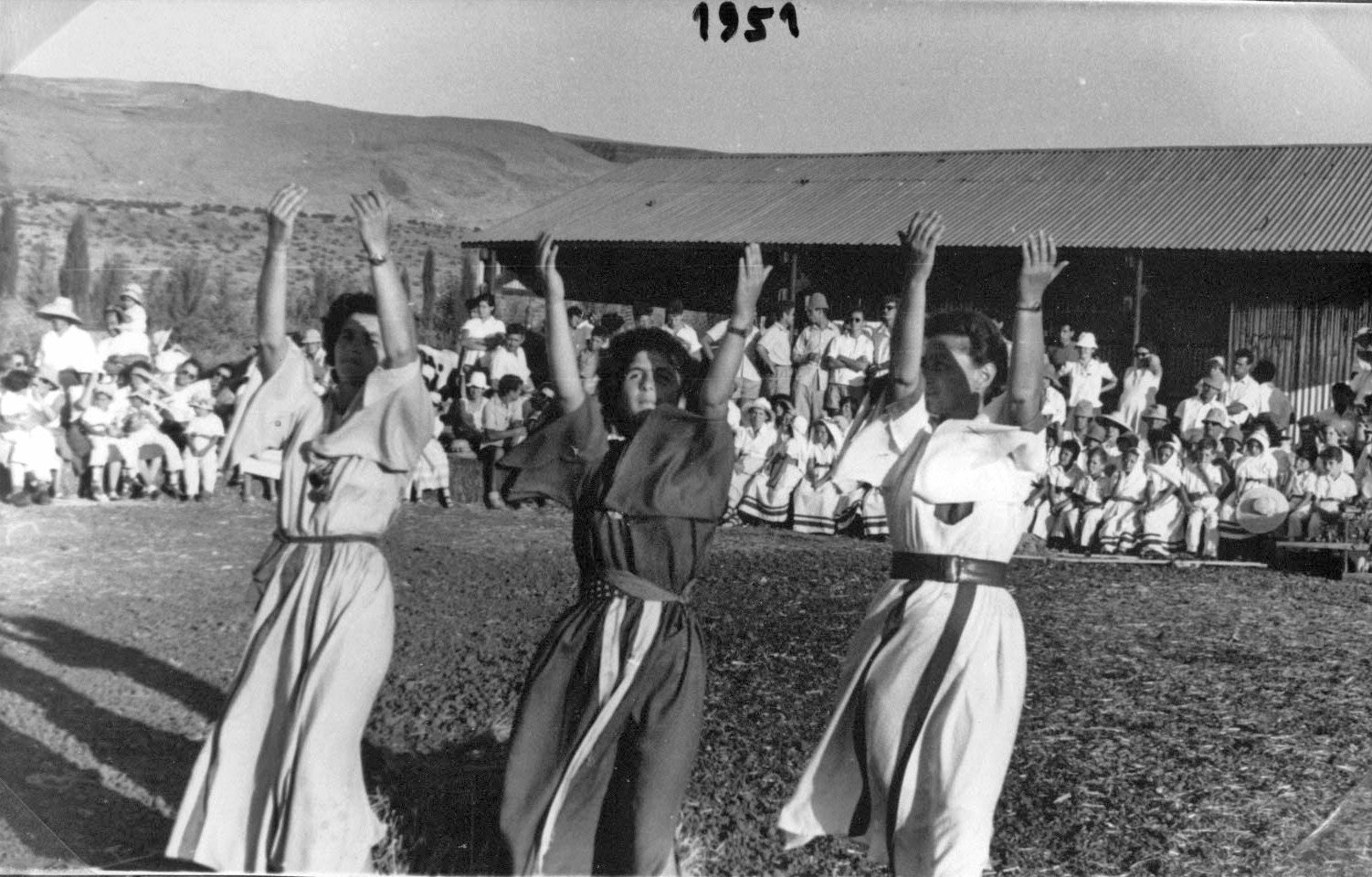
Israeli folk dancing, performance in honor of the Jewish holiday of Shavuot

Mayim Mayim (Hebrew: מים מים, "water, water") is an Israeli folk dance, danced to a song of the same name. It has become notable outside the Israeli dancing community and is often performed at international folk dance events.

== History ==
The dance was created in 1937 for a festival to celebrate the discovery of water in Kibbutz Naan after a seven-year search. The choreographer was Else I. Dublon.

The dance is known in Israel as "Ushavtem Mayim", after the first words of the lyrics, or simply just "Mayim", but "Mayim Mayim" is the original name. The movement to the first four counts has become known as the "Mayim step" and is similar to the grapevine step found in other forms of dance.

"Mayim Mayim" is done in a circle formation, facing the center through most of the dance, and holding hands except when clapping.

Count	Step
Part 1
1–4	Grapevine: Step R foot across in front of L foot, step on L foot to L, step on R foot behind L foot, step on L foot to L (turning a bit as you go, so that the R foot goes more forward and backward, rather than directly crossing)
5–16	Repeat counts 1–4 three more times
Part 2
1–4	Run four steps forward, R L R L. Begin leaning forward with arms down on 1, then straighten up and raise arms during 2–4.
5–8	Take four steps backwards, R L R L, bringing arms back down again. (A variation, more recent than the first version given here, is to clap on count 5 before beginning to bring the arms down, while in an earlier version the arms are brought down on 5.)
9–16	Repeat counts 1–8
Part 3
1–3	Facing left, run three steps forward around the circle, R L R
4	Face center while hopping on R and touching L foot slightly to the side. (In another variation, a fourth step is added here, onto the L foot, and the rest of this part is done with opposite footwork.)
5–6	Facing center, hop on R foot while touching L toe in front, hop on R foot while touching L to side, near R foot and slightly to the back.
7–12	Repeat counts 5–6 three more times, and on 12 transfer some weight onto L foot.
13–20	Repeat counts 5–12 with opposite footwork and clapping hands each time you touch R in front, finishing with R foot free to start Part 1 again. (In yet another variation, some people turn while doing counts 13–20).

== The song ==
The music for Mayim Mayim was composed by Emanuel Pugashov Amiran with lyrics taken from the Book of Isaiah, chapter 12 verse 3, "Joyfully shall you draw water from the fountains of triumph".

Ushavtem mayim b'sason mimainei hayeshua
Ushavtem mayim b'sason mimainei hayeshua

Mayim mayim mayim mayim, hey, mayim b'sason
Mayim mayim mayim mayim, hey, mayim b'sason

Hey, hey, hey, hey
Mayim mayim mayim mayim mayim mayim b'sason
Mayim mayim mayim mayim mayim mayim b'sason

== Appearances in gaming ==
- An 8 bit arrangement appears in the Game Boy Camera's Ball minigame.
- A 16 bit arrangement appears in the Super Famicom port of ClockWerx.
- A remixed version appears in Konami's Sexy Parodius.

== See also ==
- Israeli dance
