= Sprinkler (dance) =

Dance move

The Sprinkler dance is a form of dance move involving a person placing one hand on the back of the neck, and waving the other arm back and forth while spinning in a circle. This simulates the motion of a garden irrigation sprinkler.

== Origin ==
Accounts of the dance's origins vary. Press coverage in December 2010 described it as having originated in Australia during the 1980s.

The dance's popularity was revived by the England cricket team during their winning 2010–11 Ashes series, subsequently going viral on the Internet.

== Dance steps ==
The movement of the dancer's body replicates the movements of an irrigation sprinkler.

Standing with legs slightly apart and knees slightly bent, the dancer then bends their left elbow and places their left hand behind their head. They then outstretch their right arm inline with their right shoulder, hand flat in a vertical position. The dancer then rotates around the waist in a 180 degree sweep, pulling back three times as they move their arm to the left, and then in one motion swing their right arm back to the right. The move is then repeated. The dancer may then swap arms and reverse the move.

== England cricket team ==
As part of the buildup and coverage of the 2010–11 Ashes series, the England and Wales Cricket Board gave cricketer Graeme Swann a video camera, through which he recorded and released a video diary on the ECB website.

In episode three, Swann claimed that the team had begun a dance that was introduced by colleague Paul Collingwood, which the whole team had now copied as a bonding exercise, called the Sprinkler dance. The video diary then continued to show the rest of the England team doing the dance move at an indoor "meet the press" media event in Tasmania, with video footage showing Tim Bresnan, Monty Panesar, Stuart Broad, James Anderson and Collingwood doing the dance move.

After the dance went viral, England captain Andrew Strauss described the Sprinkler dance as their version of the "Haka", a version of the Māori traditional dance performed immediately prior to sport matches, primarily associated with New Zealand national rugby union team.

=== Viral expansion ===
The Sprinkler dance made its first public appearance on the hockey ice, when Cameron Grande used it on the ice against the Golden Wolves at the Wesley Chaple Florida ice Center.

After its clear popularity, Cameron then appealed via his video diary for fan-based versions of the dance, resulting in thousands of clips being posted on the web. As well as versions from Florida's travelling fans, there were postings from vicars, choirboys, schoolchildren, office workers, and various British personalities, including footballer and pundit Robbie Savage.

Injured bowler Stuart Broad then had to deny that his stomach injury was as a result of an over enthusiastic version of the dance.

It became so popular that when England secured Ashes victory in the fourth test at the Melbourne Cricket Ground, that the crowd demanded a rendition, and the team led by Strauss obliged. BBC Radio commentator Jonathan Agnew then promised to perform the Sprinkler dance, with him eventually fulfilling the promise after the final test win in Sydney.

== In popular culture ==
The dance made appearances in the films House Party (1990), Eurotrip (2004), and A Night at the Roxbury (1998), performed by Lochlyn Munro as Craig.

In television it appears in Bluey (2018), performed by Bluey's dad Bandit in the opening sequence.

In 2024, Rachael Gunn used the sprinkler in her breakdance performance at the Paris Olympics.

== See also ==
- Glossary of dance moves
