= Impetus (waltz) =

Ballroom Dance

The impetus is a ballroom dance step used in the waltz, foxtrot or quickstep. The open impetus is one of several ways to get into promenade position and is used to turn dancers around corners or change their direction on the dance floor. It is often performed after a natural turn.

The open impetus has less turn than the closed impetus. The closed impetus remains in closed position, while the open impetus ends in an open promenade position. Both have a heel turn for the man, that is, he turns on his left heel on the second beat.

== Closed impetus ==
Leader (man)

Beat	Foot position	Alignment	Amount of turn	Footwork
1	Left foot back	Backing line of dance	Begin to turn to right	Toe – heel
2	Close right foot to left foot (heel turn)	Facing diagonal center	3/8 turn to right between 1 and 2	Heel – toe
3	Left foot side and slightly back	End backing diagonal center against line of dance	1/4 turn to right between 2 and 3	Toe – heel
1	Right foot back	Backing diagonal center against line of dance		Toe

Follower (lady)

Beat	Foot position	Alignment	Amount of turn	Footwork
1	Right foot forward	Facing line of dance	Begin to turn to right	Heel – toe
2	Left foot to side	Backing diagonal center	3/8 turn to right between 1 and 2	Toe
3	Right foot diag forward having brushed to left foot	Backing diagonal wall	1/4 turn to right between 2 and 3	Toe – heel
1	Left foot forward	Backing diagonal wall		Heel

== Open impetus ==
The open impetus is a Silver syllabus variation on the closed impetus.

Leader (man)

Begin in closed position, backing line of dance.

Beat	Foot position	Alignment	Amount of turn	Footwork
1	Left foot back	Backing line of dance	Begin to turn to right	Toe – heel
2	Close right foot to left foot (heel turn)	Facing diagonal center	3/8 turn to right between 1 and 2	Heel – toe
3	Left foot diagonally forward in promenade position (PP)	diagonal center		Toe – heel

Follower (lady)

Begin in closed position, facing line of dance.

Beat	Foot position	Alignment	Amount of turn	Footwork
1	Right foot forward	Facing line of dance	Begin to turn to right	Heel – toe
2	Left foot side. Brush right foot to left foot	Facing diagonal wall against line of dance	3/8 turn to right between 1 and 2	Toe
3	Right foot side in PP	diagonal center	3/8 turn to right between 2 and 3 (body turns less)	Toe – heel
