= Letkajenkka =

Finnish dance; international dance craze

Letkajenkka (Finnish pronunciation: [ˈletkɑˌjeŋkːɑ]), is a Finnish dance.

== History of the music genre letkajenkka/letkis ==
Letkajenkka / letkis is a music genre and a general noun as well as two songs by the same name ("Letkajenkka" and "Letkis") as proper nouns, after which the genre got its name; jenkka, on the other hand, is a general noun, a music and dance genre like waltz.

The popular music genre and the ensuing dance craze were at their hottest during 1963–1965. Letkajenkka is based on the idea of performing Jenkka music using non-traditional instruments. Traditional instruments for playing the jenkka, a Finnish traditional folk dance, are instruments such as the violin and accordion. In the early 1960s some composers thought of writing jenkka tunes for more contemporary bands with more modern instruments, such as wind instruments (for a more swing-like jenkka) and amplified instruments like electric guitars, basses, and drums (a more rock 'n' roll or boogie woogie-like sound). The form of the letkajenkka songs is consistent with traditional jenkka, but where the music is distinctively jenkka, the dance steps are not. Both dances are based on a lightly bouncing and skipping step. A rhythmic component that contributes towards the feel of a letkajenkka and distinguishes a letkajenkka from a regular jenkka tune is a distinctive pattern of either three crotchets / quarter notes followed by a quarter rest or two crotchets / quarter notes followed by a third dotted one in the end of its musical phrases that more or less coincide with the three consecutive hops of the dance steps. Regular jenkkas do not typically feature this rhythm pattern, at least not repeatedly.

Erik Lindström introduced the genre with his song Letkajenkka. A Swedish band called the Adventurers recorded it, and it immediately topped the charts in Finland. Later Jan Rohde, a Norwegian artist, recorded a version with lyrics with the bands the Adventurers and the Wild Ones.

Half a year later Rauno Lehtinen followed with his song Letkis. This has become by far the most popular of all songs in the letkajenkka genre. It was first recorded by his studio orchestra Rautalanka Oy in August 1963, but was made popular in the October of the same year by a group called Ronnie Krank's Orchestra. His chart topper has been re-recorded approximately a hundred times, and the rights to at least 60 versions of the song are owned by Swedish publisher Stig Anderson. One well known recording of the song is by German musician Roberto Delgado.

For versions in other languages, Lehtinen's Letkis was renamed Letkiss, Let's Kiss, Lasst uns Küssen etc., for easier pronunciation in different languages. The name Letkis has nothing to do with kissing; the idea of kissing was introduced by non-Finnish speakers, who thought that the title of the song sounded like "kissing". In Finnish Letkis / letkis is merely short for Letkajenkka / letkajenkka, a diminutive formed by the beginning of the word and adding "is" in the end.

Also, contrary to what some magazines and single and long play covers had the world believe, there is no kissing or "smooching" during the Finnish version of the dance.

Lehtinen's Letkis made the charts in many European countries, in Latin America, and even in Japan. There are numerous translations including Russian, Swedish, and Japanese. In 1965, four instrumental versions of the tune reached number one in the Netherlands simultaneously. These were by Stig Rauno, Gudrun Jankis, The Wild Ones and the Dutch Swing College Band. All four versions had the English title Letkiss rather than the original Finnish title. It remained the only Dutch number one to have originated from Finland until 2000, when "Freestyler" by the Bomfunk MC's reached number one.

== Description ==
The steps of Letkajenkka are like the steps of Bunny Hop, a novelty dance from the 1950s. It has been proposed that exchange students returning from the United States to Finland would have imported the steps of the Bunny Hop to Finland, as they had seen them on the TV show Bandstand. Whereas the Bunny Hop starts with a right foot lead, the Letkajenkka / letkajenkka transformed into a dance based on the same step, but starting with a left leg lead. This can be seen from the early recordings for TV and in some movies made during the hottest craze. Also many translated lyrics include advice on the steps: "left kick, left kick, right kick, right kick, forward jump, backward jump, hop, hop, hop".

=== Steps ===
The people participating in the dance form a Conga-like line (that can also be a circle) so that everyone holds the person in front of themselves by the shoulders or the waist. The steps go as follows (everybody does the same thing):

1. kick to the left with the left foot & step back into the middle,
2. kick to the left with the left foot & step back into the middle,
3. kick to the right with the right foot & step back into the middle,
4. kick to the right with the right foot & step back into the middle,
5. jump forwards with both feet together (for only a few inches),
6. jump backwards with both feet,
7. jump forwards three times with both feet,

(repeat).

1–4 may be enhanced by bouncing with the leg opposite to the kicking side.

== International letkajenkka songs ==
The music genre became popular, and many composers around the world started writing letkis music. Examples of non-Finnish letkis music include "La Yenka" (performed by Johnny & Charley Kurt, 1965), the Kessler Twins' Lasciati Baciare Col Letkis, "Leaf Fall" (Russian: Листопад) by David Tukhmanov and Ploem Ploem Jenka by Pieter Goemans. Lehtinen's Letkis was translated and covered in Japanese as Retto Kisu (Jenka) / レット・キス（ジェンカ）, performed by Kyu Sakamoto.

== Original Finnish songs ==
In Finland, the most well-known letkajenkka songs include

- Letkajenkka by Erik Lindström
- Letkis by Rauno Lehtinen
- Doin' the Jenka (trad.)
- At the Jenka Show by Georg Malmstén
- Helsinki-letkis by Toivo Kärki
- Minne tuuli kuljettaa by Toivo Kärki
- Puhelinlangat laulaa

== In popular culture ==
The movie Jamboree66 (Sampaguita Pictures, Philippines, 1966, directed by Luciano B. Carlos) features a scene where the song "Letkis" is being played at a club.

There are at least two Letkajenkkas by Mimis Plessas that appear in the Greek movie Mia Trelli, Trelli Oikogeneia (Crazy, crazy family) that is directed by Dinos Dimopoulos. There is a scene with people dancing around the pool. The steps are not strictly jenkka, but the music is in the style of letkis. In another scene, Katerina Gogou and Alekos Tzanetakos are dancing a letkajenkka variation as a couple to letkis music. The choreography is John Flery's.

In the Hungarian movie Patyolat akció (1965), Mari Törőcsik and Gyula Bodrogi perform letkajenkka. The dance also appears in the Polish film Małżeństwo z rozsądku from 1966 (en. Marriage of Convenience) and was later released in that version on cardboard record as Polski Let's Kiss (en. Polish Let's Kiss). Same tune is also used in Polish TV series Wojna Domowa airing 1965-66 of the same composer.

In the final scene of the Italian film Io la conoscevo bene (1965) directed by Antonio Pietrangeli, the protagonist Adriana (Stefania Sandrelli) plays the record of the version of Letkiss by Robert Delgado (Horst Wende).

In Cave Story, the side character Jenka is named after the letkajenkka dance, and letkajenkka, her theme tune, plays in her house and in the Labyrinth.

In 2015, on its 150th anniversary, the Finnish telecom company Nokia broke the world record of the letkajenkka line. 1393 persons in blue Nokia shirts stood in line forming the digits "150" when, in a surprise from the management, the music started to play. The previous record of 1354 dancers was held in Kokemäki in 1995.

== See also ==
- Jenkka
