= Change step =

The closed change is a Pre-Bronze, or newcomer waltz figure, performed in closed position. Changes may start of the right foot or left foot, moving forward or backward. This makes four different types of closed changes. Combining two changes results in a box step. In right changes the man starts from the right foot, while in left ones the man starts from the left foot.

The figures are called "changes" because they allow dancers to change from natural turn to reverse turn (i.e., right (clockwise) to left (counter-clockwise) turn) and vice versa. For example, a basic practising variation in waltz goes as follows:

1. Dance 1–6 steps of natural turn,
2. then 1–3 steps of closed change from natural to reverse,
3. then 1–6 steps of reverse turn,
4. then 1–3 steps of closed change from reverse to natural,
5. repeat until the music stops or partner drops.

Other change steps include the hesitation change and the outside change, described below.

== Closed change from natural to reverse turn ==
The man steps forward on right foot while the lady steps backward on the opposing (i.e., left) foot. They will then step to the side (and possibly slightly forward, in relation to the man) on the other foot, and conclude the figure by closing the first foot beside the second. Each step takes up a full beat of the music.

A turn of up to 1/8 is optional. There will be slight contra body movement (CBM) on 1, and sway on 2,3.

Leader (man)

Beat	Foot position	Alignment	Amount of turn	Footwork
1	Right foot forward	Facing diagonal center	None	Heel – toe
2	Left foot side, slightly forward	Facing diagonal center	None	Toe
3	Right foot closes to left foot	Facing diagonal center	None	Toe – heel

Follower (lady)

Beat	Foot position	Alignment	Amount of turn	Footwork
1	Left foot back	Backing diagonal center	None	Toe – heel
2	Right foot side, slightly back	Backing diagonal center	None	Toe
3	Left foot closes to right foot	Backing diagonal center	None	Toe – heel

== Other closed changes ==
The closed change from reverse to natural turn is the mirror image of the move just described. Backward changes start with the leader stepping back and the follower stepping forward.

== Hesitation change ==
The hesitation change is a Bronze syllabus figure. The first 3 steps are identical to the natural turn. The last 3 steps comprise the "hesitation". The leader's heel pull allows time to change directions or pause for floor craft.

Leader (man)

Beat	Foot position	Alignment	Amount of turn	Footwork
1	Right foot forward	Facing diagonal wall	Start to turn right	Heel – toe
2	Left foot to side	Backing diagonal center	1/4 between 1 and 2	Toe
3	Right foot closes to left foot	Backing line of dance	1/8 between 2 and 3	Toe – heel
1	Left foot back	Backing line of dance	Start to turn right	Heel
2	Right foot to side small step (heel pull)	Facing diagonal center	3/8 between 4 and 5	Inside edge of foot, whole foot
3	Left foot closes to right foot without weight	Facing diagonal center		Inside edge of toe (left foot)

== Outside change ==
The outside change is a Bronze syllabus figure. It has regular waltz rise and fall over the three beat phrase.

Leader (man)

Beat	Foot position	Alignment	Amount of turn	Footwork
1	Left foot back	Backing diagonal center		Toe – heel
2	Right foot back	Backing diagonal center	Starts to turn left	Toe
3	Left foot to side and slightly forward	Pointing diagonal wall	1/4 between 2 and 3, body turns less	Toe – heel
1	Right foot forward in contra body movement position, outside partner position	Facing diagonal wall		Heel

Follower (lady)

Beat	Foot position	Alignment	Amount of turn	Footwork
1	Right foot forward	Facing diagonal center		Heel – toe
2	Left foot forward	Facing diagonal center	Starts to turn left	Toe
3	Right foot to side and slightly back	Backing diagonal wall	1/4 between 2 and 3, body turns less	Toe – heel
1	Left foot back in contra body movement position	Backing diagonal wall		Toe
