= Fleckerl =

Dance step

A couple waltzing in place, a zoopraxiscope picture; looks like fleckerl

A fleckerl (Austrian German: a square-shaped noodle or a rag) is a dance step, most commonly found in the Viennese waltz. Unlike the natural and reverse turns, the fleckerl does not move forwards along the dance floor but instead rotates on the spot.

Fleckerls are danced clockwise or counter-clockwise (natural or reverse), and the basic shape lasts for six steps (two three-note bars). The leader crosses his foot in front on steps 1 and 3, while crossing behind on step 5 and to the side on 2, 4 and 6, creating the pattern: in front, side, in front, side, behind, side. The follower dances the same pattern but offset by a bar: side, behind, side, in front, side, in front.

It is normal for a couple to move to the center of the dancefloor before dancing fleckerls, since this means that other dancers (who, in the Viennese waltz, are continually moving around the floor at high speed) do not have to make avoiding maneuvers.
