= Pivot turn =

In dance, a pivot turn (or simply pivot) is a general classification for dance turns in which the performer's body rotates about its vertical axis without traveling. The performer may be supported by one or both feet, which swivel in place during the pivot turn. In some dance genres, a pivot on both feet is called a twist turn. Pivot turns are commonly named as such in ballroom dancing, folk dancing and ethnic dances. In many other dance genres, pivot turns are known by specific names and typically are not referred to as pivots. For example, in ballet, a pirouette is a type of pivot turn on one foot.

== Ethnic dances ==
A Native American pivot turn, as described by Bessie and May Evans (1931), is performed standing on the ball of one foot and tapping with the other foot, accompanied with small turns on the standing foot with each tap. The full turn requires about 16 taps.

A Russian pivot turn, as described by Bessie and May Evans, is performed as follows. The right foot is placed flat and the left foot is placed with the toe by the right heel and the left heel raised and this relative position basically maintained during the turning. The turn starts with the right foot raised from the floor. While continuously revolving, on each strong beat (downbeat) the right foot is stepped flat and on each weak beat (upbeat) the left foot is stepped on the ball (by the right heel).

== Ballroom technique ==
Various types of pivot turns are performed in ballroom dance, including slip pivot, reverse pivot, chains of pivot turns, half pivot (as in fourth step of a natural spin turn), man's first step of an outside spin, and man's third step (toe pivot) of a double reverse spin.
