= Turn (dance and gymnastics) =

Rotation of the body

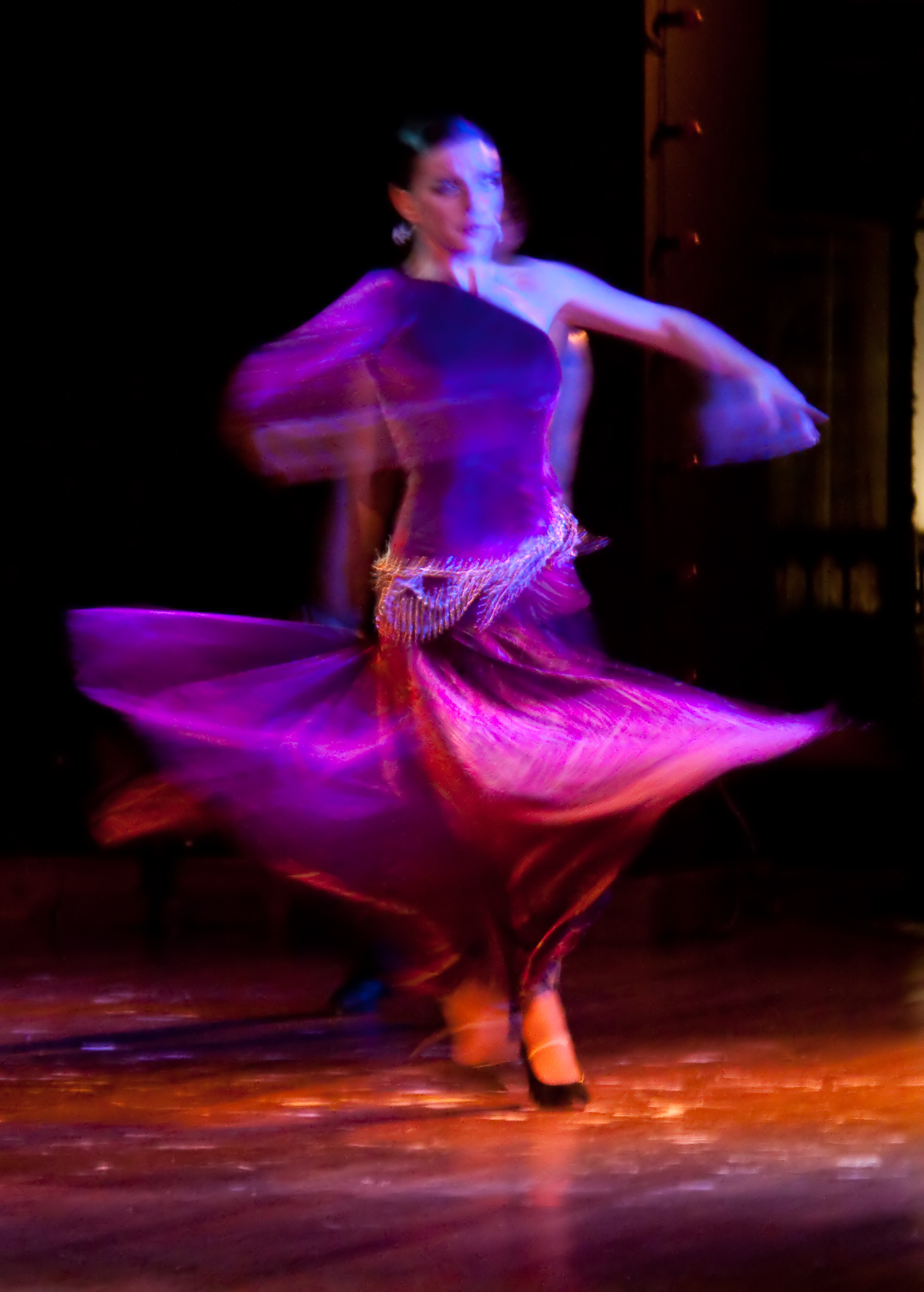
A turning Flamenco dancer

In dance and gymnastics, a turn is a rotation of the body about the vertical axis. It is usually a complete rotation of the body, although quarter (90°) and half (180°) turns are possible for some types of turns. Multiple, consecutive turns are typically named according to the number of 360° rotations (e.g., double or triple turn).

There are many types of turns, which are differentiated by a number of factors. The performer may be supported by one or both legs or be airborne during a turn. When supported by one leg, that leg is known as the supporting leg and the other as the free, raised, or working leg. During airborne turns, the first leg to leave the floor is the leading leg. Trunk, arm and head positions can vary, and in turns with one supporting leg, the free leg may be straight or bent. Turns can begin in various ways as well. For example, ballet turns may begin by rising to relevé (supported on the ball of the foot) or by stepping directly onto relevé.

Some turns can be executed in either of two directions. In ballet, a turn in the direction of the raised leg is said to be en dehors whereas a turn in the opposite direction is en dedans. In ballroom dancing, a natural turn is a clockwise revolution of dance partners around each other, and its mirrored counterpart is the counter-clockwise reverse turn.

In some dance genres and dance notation systems (e.g., Labanotation), a turn in which the performer rotates without traveling is known as a pivot. Pivots may be performed on one or on both feet; the latter is sometimes called a twist turn.

== Technique ==
Spotting is a technique that is often used when executing turns, in which a performer executes a periodic, rapid rotation of the head that serves to fix the performer's gaze on a single spot, thus giving the impression that the head is always facing forward. Spotting prevents dizziness by allowing the head to remain stable during most of the turn. This helps the performer maintain balance and, when executing traveling turns such as tours chaînés and piques, it helps the performer control the direction of travel.

== Types of turns ==
=== Attitude ===
An attitude turn is performed with the working leg held in attitude position. In ballet, the performer may be assisted by a partner so that the turn can be performed slowly.

=== Axel ===
An axel is a turn in which the performer leaps into the air and, while airborne, tucks both legs underneath and rotates. It is usually executed while traveling across the floor. It is commonly performed in jazz dance and is often immediately preceded by a chaînés in a deep plié (bend of the knees).

=== Barrel roll ===
A sequence of two barrel rolls performed during an acro dance

A barrel roll turn, or simply barrel roll, is a turn that involves casting the arms up and leaping into the air and rotating 360 degrees while airborne. While airborne, the performer's back may be arched and the head may be cast back. It starts and ends with the performer facing forward. Barrel roll turns are commonly used in tap, jazz, and contemporary dance.

=== Chaînés ===
Chaînés (French, meaning "chain") is a type of two-step turn that is executed repeatedly while the performer travels along a line or curved (often circular or elliptical) path. It is performed quickly on alternating feet and results in a complete rotation for every two steps taken. It is commonly used in ballet, modern, and ballroom dancing.

In the first half-turn, one foot is stepped out to the dancer's side in the direction of travel and placed in releve or en pointe; the dancer then rotates 180° on the placed foot while lifting the other foot so that it crosses over the placed foot. As this happens, the arms are brought together away from the chest and spotting technique is employed so that the dancer's head faces the direction of travel as much as possible. The second half-turn is executed with the feet together. Upon completion of the second half-turn, the first foot is stepped out again to begin another turn.

In ballet, chaînés turns are usually performed at a very fast tempo, with each turn lasting one half or one quarter of a music beat. They can be performed outwards (en dehors), or inwards (en dedans).

=== Fouetté ===
Fouetté en tournant

A fouetté turn (or fouetté en tournant) begins with the performer standing on one flat foot in plié (with knee bent). The working leg is extended and whipped around (fouetté is French for "whipped") to the side and then, once extended to maximum turnout, bent and pulled in to a passe or retiré position. The foot beats behind the knee and then to the front of the knee of the supporting leg before extending back out to the front. At the same time, the supporting foot transitions to relevé (heel raised), in ballet often rising to en pointe (on toe tips). These movements create the angular momentum needed for one turn, which is executed by rotating in place on the supporting foot.

In classical ballet, particular significance is attached to the successful completion of 32 consecutive fouettés, a feat first performed publicly by Italian ballerina Pierina Legnani in 1893 and since incorporated into the grand pas of Swan Lake and other 20th-century ballets. Jeanne Devereaux, an American prima ballerina in the first half of the 20th century, held the world record of 16 triple fouettés (48 total).

=== Illusion ===
An illusion turn performed during an acro dance

An illusion turn (or simply illusion) is performed by keeping the working leg aligned with the torso while, simultaneously, a 360 degree spin is executed while the torso pivots down and then back up at the hip. An illusion can be performed by turning toward or away from the working leg; the latter is known as a reverse illusion. Illusions are commonly performed in jazz dance and rhythmic gymnastics.

=== Piqué ===
A piqué turn is begun by stepping directly onto the ball of a relevé (or en pointe) foot, followed by a complete rotation while supported by the relevé (or en pointe) foot before returning to plié position. The working leg is often held in retiré position, but may be held in a variety of other positions, either with or without turnout.

=== Pirouette ===
Pirouettes performed during a pas de deux

A pirouette (literally "whirl" or "spin") is a type of dance turn on one foot. It is performed with turnout (legs rotated outward at hips) in ballet, and typically without turnout in gymnastics and many other genres of dance, such as jazz and modern. It is often executed by starting with one or both legs in plié (knees bent) and then rising onto demi pointe (heels raised) as the turn commences, or in the case of ballet dancers, en pointe (on toe tips). Pirouettes may be executed singly or in multiple rotations; the latter is commonly performed in the adagio part of a grand pas de deux.

There are many variations of pirouettes. A pirouette can be executed beginning from fifth or fourth position in ballet, whereas artistic gymnasts usually start from fourth position. In ballet, the working leg can be held in retiré position or in attitude, arabesque, or second position. The performer may return to the starting position, finish in arabesque or attitude, or proceed otherwise. A pirouette is most often performed en dehors but can also be performed en dedans.

== See also ==
- Figure skating spins
- Glossary of ballet
- List of gymnastics terms
- Whirling
