= Viennese waltz =

Genre of ballroom dance

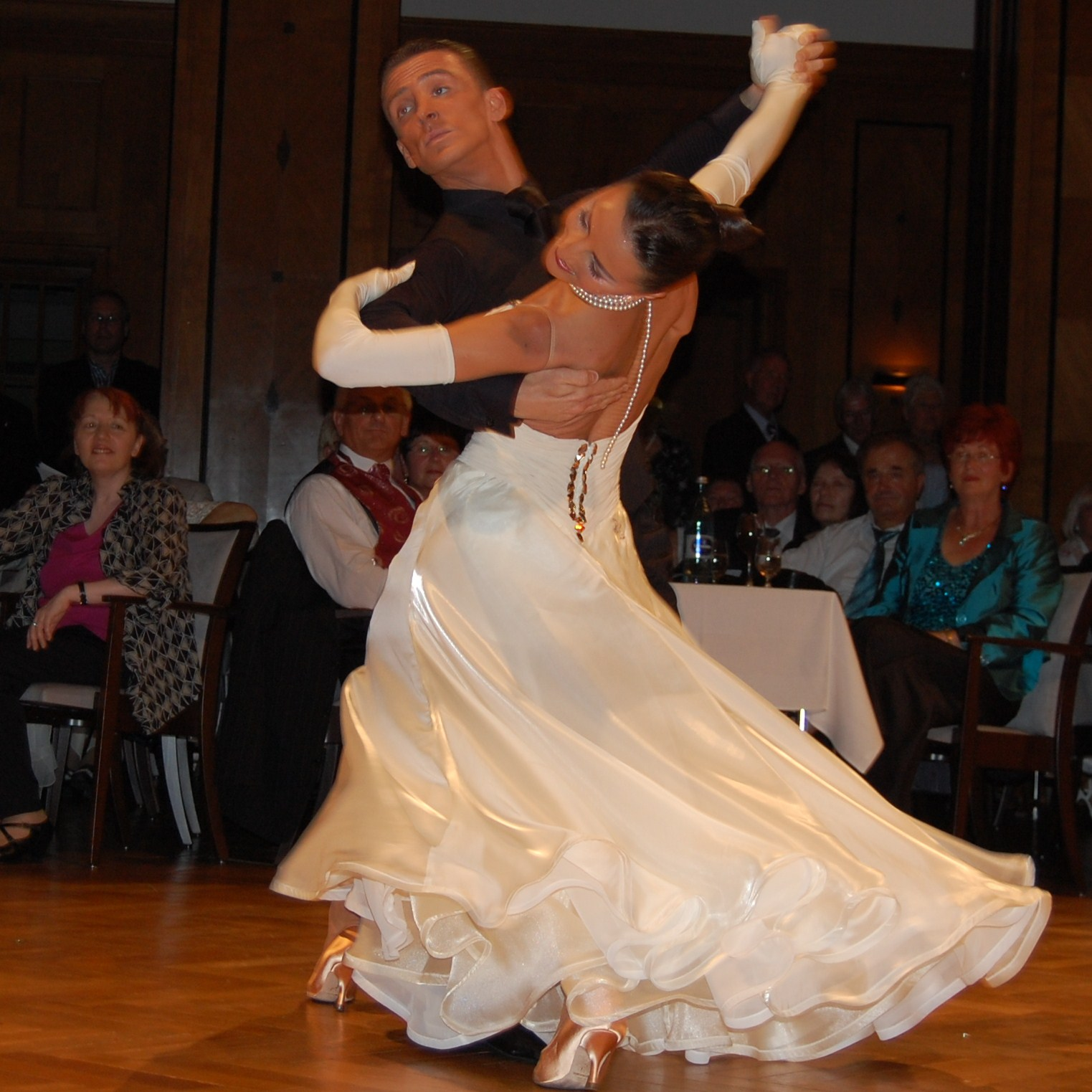
Dancers

Viennese waltz (German: Wiener Walzer) is a form of ballroom dance. At least four different meanings are recognized. In the historically first sense, the name may refer to several versions of the waltz, including the earliest waltzes done in ballroom dancing, danced to the music of Viennese waltz.

What is now called the Viennese waltz is the original form of the waltz. It was the first ballroom dance performed in the closed hold or "waltz" position. The dance that is popularly known as the waltz is actually the English or slow waltz, danced at approximately 90 beats per minute with 3 beats to the bar (the international standard of 30 measures per minute), while the Viennese waltz is danced at about 180 beats (58-60 measures) per minute. To this day however, in Germany, Austria, Scandinavia, and France, the words Walzer (German), vals (Danish, Norwegian, and Swedish), and valse (French) still implicitly refer to the original dance and not the slow waltz.

The Viennese waltz is a rotary dance where the dancers are constantly turning either toward the leader's right (natural) or toward the leader's left (reverse), interspersed with non-rotating change steps to switch between the direction of rotation.

As the waltz evolved, some of the versions that were done at about the original fast tempo came to be called specifically "Viennese waltz" to distinguish them from the slower waltzes. In the modern ballroom dance, two versions of Viennese waltz are recognized: International Style and American Style.

Today the Viennese waltz is a ballroom and partner dance that is part of the International Standard division of contemporary ballroom dance. The Waltz Series is a New York membership society devoted to preserving the pre-World War I tradition of Viennese waltz. It organizes a program of dances.

== History ==
=== Early history ===
The Viennese waltz, so called to distinguish it from the waltz, is the oldest of the current ballroom dances. It emerged in the second half of the 18th century from the German dance and the Ländler in Austria and was both popular and subject to criticism. At that time, the waltz, as described in a magazine from 1799, was performed by dancers who held on to their long gowns to prevent them from dragging or being stepped on. The dancers would lift their dresses and hold them high like cloaks, and this would bring both their bodies under one cover. This action also required the dancers' bodies to be very close together, and this closeness attracted moral disparagement. In 1797, Wolf published a pamphlet against the dance entitled "Proof that Waltzing is the Main Source of Weakness of the Body and Mind of our Generation". But even when faced with all this negativity, it became very popular in Vienna. Large dance halls like the Zum Sperl in 1807 and the Apollo in 1808 were opened to provide space for thousands of dancers. The dance reached and spread to England sometime before 1812. It was introduced as the German waltz and became a huge hit. It gained ground through the Congress of Vienna at the beginning of the 19th century and by the famous compositions by Josef Lanner, Johann Strauss I and his son, Johann Strauss II, and since then has been known as the Viennese waltz.

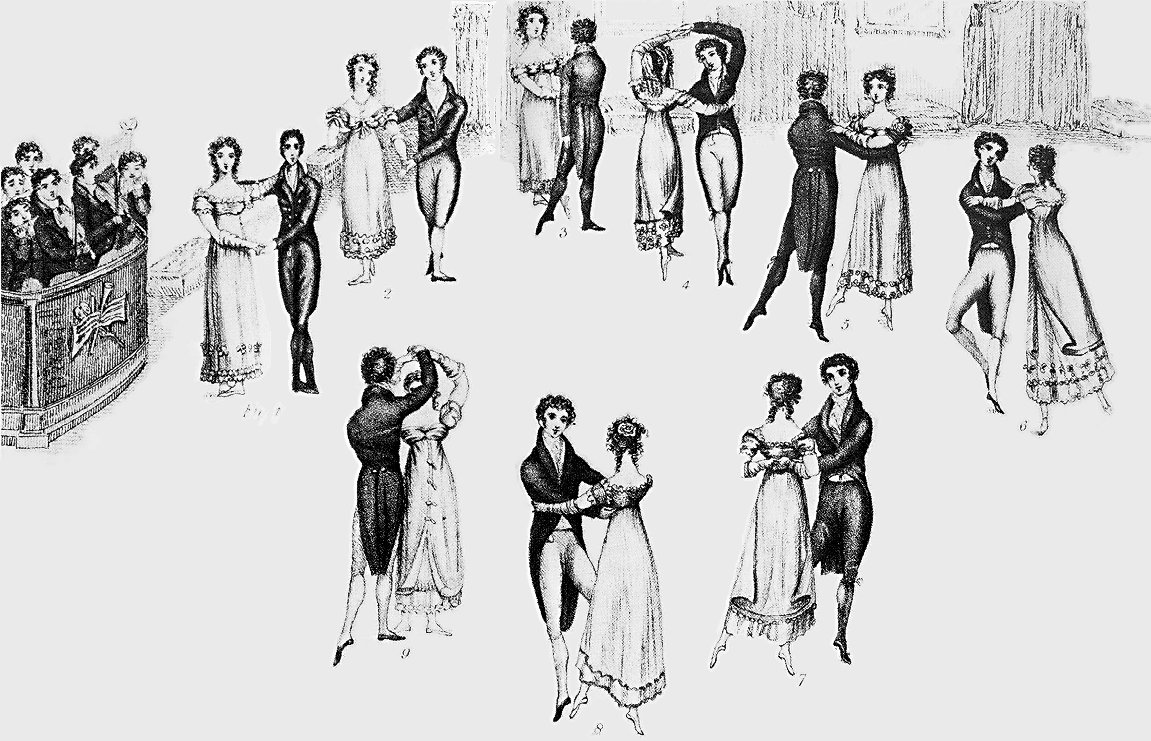
Early waltz steps, 1816 from Thomas Wilson Treatise on Waltzing

Initially, the waltz was significantly different from its form today. In the first place, the couples did not dance in the closed position as today. The illustrations and descriptions make it clear that the couples danced with arm positions similar to that of the precursor dances, the Ländler and the Allemande. The hold was at times semi-closed and at times side by side. Arms were intertwined and circling movements were made under raised arms. No couple in Wilson's plate are shown in close embrace, but some are in closed hold facing each other. Another significant difference from the present technique was that the feet were turned out and the rise of foot during the dance was much more pronounced. This can be seen quite clearly in the figure, and such a style imposes its limitations on how the dance can be performed.

To understand why Quirey says "The advent of the Waltz in polite society was quite simply the greatest change in dance form and dancing manners that has happened in our history" we need to realize that all European social dances before the waltz were communal sequence dances – communal, because all the dancers on the floor took part in a preset pattern (often chosen by a master of ceremony). Dancers separately, and as couples, faced outwards to the spectators as much as they faced inwards. Thus all present took part as dancers or as onlookers. This was the way with the country dance and all previous popular dances. With the waltz, couples were independent of each other and were turned towards each other (though not in close contact). Lord Byron wrote a furious letter, which precedes his poem "The Waltz", in which he decries the anti-social nature of the dance, with the couple "like two cockchafers spitted on the same bodkin."

== Technique and styles ==
The Viennese waltz is a rotary dance where the dancers are constantly turning either in a clockwise ("natural") or counter-clockwise ("reverse") direction interspersed with non-rotating change steps to switch between the direction of rotation. A true Viennese waltz consists only of turns and change steps. Other moves such as the fleckerls, American-style figures and side sway or underarm turns are modern inventions.

The competitive styles of Viennese waltz has a reduced number of steps, depending on the style and competition level or medal exam level.

=== International-style Viennese waltz ===
International-style Viennese waltz is danced in closed position. The syllabus is limited to natural and reverse turns, closed and open changes, fleckerls, contra check, left whisk, and canter-time pivot turns (canter pivots).

In World Dance Council competition, canter pivots are excluded.

=== American-style Viennese waltz ===
American-style Viennese waltz has much more freedom, both in dance positions and syllabus.

== See also ==
- Waltz
- Austrian folk dancing
- Ballroom dance
- Palm court
