= Natural spin turn =

The natural spin turn is a ballroom dance step used in the waltz. It is typically used to advance a couple 5/4 of a turn down line of dance, although an underturned spin turn is also very useful for turning a corner. The natural spin turn is also considered an intermediary step toward learning pivots.

== Technique ==
The natural spin turn consists of the first half of a natural turn followed by an under-turned pivot.

Leader (man)

Beat	Foot position	Alignment	Amount of turn	Footwork
1	Right foot forward	Facing diagonal wall	Begin to turn right	Heel – toe
2	Left foot side	Backing diagonal center	1/4 between 1 and 2	Toe
3	Right foot closes to left foot	Backing line of dance	1/8 between 2 and 3	Toe – heel
4	Left foot back	Down line of dance, toe turned in	1/2 to right (pivot)	Toe – heel – toe
5	Right foot forward in contra body movement position (CBMP)	Facing line of dance	Continue to turn	Heel – toe
6	Left foot side and slightly back	Backing diagonal center	Continue to turn 3/8 between 5 and 6	Toe – heel

Follower (lady)

Beat	Foot position	Alignment	Amount of turn	Footwork
1	Left foot back	Backing diagonal wall	Begin to turn right	Toe – heel
2	Right foot side	Pointing line of dance	3/8 between 1 and 2 (body turns less)	Toe
3	Left foot closes to right foot	Facing line of dance	Body completes turn	Toe – heel
4	Right foot forward	Facing line of dance	1/2 to right (pivot)	Heel – toe
5	Left foot back and slightly to side	Backing line of dance	Continue to turn	Toe
6	Right foot diagonally forward having brushed to left foot	Facing diagonal center	3/8 between 5 and 6	Toe – heel

== Underturned spin ==
The underturned spin is a useful variation on the natural spin turn that allows a leader to navigate a corner. The step is identical to the natural spin turn but only rotates 3/8 of a turn on the pivot (beat 4) instead of 1/2, and 1/4 of a turn on 4 to 6 instead of 3/8. This reduces the total amount of rotation by 1/4 of a turn.
