= Double reverse spin =

Dance move

The double reverse spin is a ballroom dance move used in the waltz and the quickstep. It typically rotates a full turn in one measure of music, although it can rotate anywhere from 3/4 to a full turn.

== Footwork ==
The double reverse spin consists of a heel pivot to Viennese cross (the left foot crossing in front of the right foot) for the follower and a reverse turn to toe pivot for the leader.

Leader (man)

Beat	Foot position	Alignment	Amount of turn	Footwork
1	Left foot forward	Facing line of dance	Begin to turn left	Heel – toe
2	Right foot to side	Backing diagonal wall	3/8 between 1 and 2	Toe
3	Left foot closes to right foot without weight	Facing diagonal wall	5/8 between 2 and 3	Toe

Follower (lady)

Beat	Foot position	Alignment	Amount of turn	Footwork
1	Right foot back	Backing line of dance	Begin to turn left	Toe – heel
2	Left foot closes to right foot	Facing line of dance	1/2 between 1 and 2	Heel – toe
&	Right foot to side and slightly back	Backing wall	3/8 between 2 and "&"	Toe
3	Left foot crosses in front of right foot	Backing diagonal wall	1/8 between "and" and 3	Toe – heel
