= Dance positions =

Body positions in dance

Dance position is the position of a dancer or the mutual position of a dance couple assumed during a dance. Describing and mastering proper dance positions is an important part of dance technique.

These dance positions of a single dancer may be further detailed into body, head, arm, hand, leg, and foot positions; also, these positions in a dance couple can additionally take into account connection, the relative orientation of partners, and directions of movement (or of movement intention).

In ballet, the term "pose" is used to describe stationary dance positions; the most important are referred to as "first position" through to "fifth position." The following includes descriptions of all major ballet positions.

== Development ==
Classical ballet positions were influenced by Baroque art, especially the ideal of contraposto in sculpture, where the limbs were arranged "as an active spiral, denying any flattening symmetrical frontality." Added to this was the "conscious elegance" and martial skill of the nobles who danced the first court ballets, whose "gestures were symmetrical, harmonious, circular; all opening from a central axis, based on the turned-out leg and port de bras or fencing position.... to provide a base for thrusting, dodging, and recoiling.... to move in any direction instantly." In 1661, Louis XIV asked his ballet master, Pierre Beauchamp, "to codify, classify, and name the style and all the acceptable and successfully pretty steps."

== Five basic foot positions ==
Most all leg movements begin from, and end at, these five positions:

1. First position: This is the main ballet position, and for most beginners, it is the basic position to start from. In this standing position, the dancer’s feet remain connected at the heels, with the toes turned out at a 90-degree angle, or greater. In this position, the entire sole of the dancer’s foot and toes are in contact with the floor. The ideal turn-out angle is 180 degrees, but beginners are advised to work up to that position gradually and comfortably.
2. Second position: Starting with the foot placement for first position, the dancer slides one foot away from the other to create a space of roughly one and a half feet between both feet. The feet remain turned out at a 90-degree angle, or greater. The ideal turn-out is 180 degrees, "in straight line", with the feet separated by one foot.
3. Third position: Starting with the foot placement for first position, the dancer slides one foot slightly forward so that the back of the heel of one foot is touching the arch of the other foot. In this position, the entire sole of the dancer’s front and back foot and toes are in contact with the floor.
4. Fourth position: Starting with the foot placement for third position, the dancer slides the front foot directly forward, with a distance of roughly a foot between the front and back feet. In this position, the entire sole of the dancer’s front and back foot and toes are in contact with the floor.
5. Fifth position: Starting with the foot placement for fourth position, the dancer will slide the front foot back so that the heel of the front foot is directly touching the front toes of the back foot. In this position, both feet are parallel and the entire sole of the dancer’s front and back foot and toes are in contact with the floor.

The dancer's weight should be centered between the feet, with tightened thighs and buttocks, thighs turned outward, knees in line with center of feet, shoulders down, arms rounded and slightly away from the body, head centered, and eyes straight ahead.

== Five basic arm positions ==
1. First position: the dancer stands as if holding a large, round object in front of the body, with a distance of one foot between their two hands.
2. Second position: the dancer extends both arms perpendicularly from the body in a T-shaped position, with the elbows facing back and the fingers curved slightly.
3. Third position: the dancer extends one arm perpendicularly from the body, as is done in second position, and extends the other arm outwards in front of the body, as is done in first position.
4. Fourth position: the dancer extends one arm perpendicularly from the body, as is done in second position, and raises the other arm upwards in the air, parallel to the head and neck, with hand and fingers curved slightly.
5. Fifth position: the dancer extends both arms overhead, parallel to the head and neck, creating an oval shape with their two curved arms.

== Body positions ==
1. Arabesque: a position of the body in which a dancer stands on one leg with the other leg raised behind the body, extended backward in a straight line.
2. Attitude: a position of the body which is a variation of the arabesque. In this position, a dancer's extended leg is raised behind the body, bent at the knee at a 90-degree angle.
3. Assemblé: a jump in which a dancer leaves the ground on one leg, and lands on the ground on two legs. The dancer's legs come together at the same time and return to fifth position.
4. Grand jeté: a large jump or leap from one foot to the other. In this movement, the raised foot moves forward and then is thrown back as the jump is made, with the landing on the raised foot.
5. Plié: a bending of the knee or knees.
6. Turnout: a body position in which the dancer turns his or her feet and legs out from the hip joints.
7. Pirouette: a complete, 360-degree spin or turn of the body on one foot, on point or half-point.

== See also ==
- Glossary of ballet
- Ballet technique
- Dance notation
- History of ballet

== Bibliography ==
- De Mille, Agnes (1963). The Book of the Dance. New York: Golden Press, Inc. LCCN 63-18908.
- Kirstein, Lincoln; Stuart, Muriel (1952). The Classic Ballet: Basic Technique and Terminology. New York: Alfred A. Knopf, Inc. LCCN 51-11993.
