= Grapevine (dance move) =

Dance figure in partner dancing

The grapevine is a dance figure in partner dancing that shares a common appearance, with some variation, in ballroom, club, and folk dances. It includes side steps and steps across the support foot. The step is used, for example, in the foxtrot, polka, Electric Slide and hustle as well as in freestyle aerobics.

Troy and Margaret West Kinney described it in 1914 as part of the One-Step.

The Grape-Vine is an alternation of second and fourth positions of the feet; one foot travelling sideways on a straight line, the other foot going from anterior to posterior fourth position, and vice versa. The step travels to the woman's right (the man's left), without turning.

The man's steps are the converse of the woman's, he starting with his left foot. The step is executed in closed position of the couple, and is usually performed several times in succession. The arrival of the feet in fourth position is usually punctuated with a slight dip.

== Sequence ==
The most basic repeating sequence of steps may be;

- Side step,
- Step behind the support foot,
- Side step,
- Step across support foot.

The sequence may start from any of the four steps and may break wherever it is convenient to move into another dance figure or in the opposite direction. The whole sequence is in the same direction.

In some dances (e.g., Polka, Hustle, Electric Slide) it is an eight count figure, often split into two, mirroring each other and called "grapevine to the right" and "grapevine to the left".

1. Step right
2. Step left foot to the right, crossing in front of right foot
3. Step right
4. Tap left against right
5. Step left
6. Step right foot to the left, crossing in front of the left foot
7. Step left
8. Tap right against left

== See also ==
- Mayim Mayim, a popular Israeli folk dance that uses a grapevine-style step
- Glossary of dance moves
