= Contra body movement =

Dance move

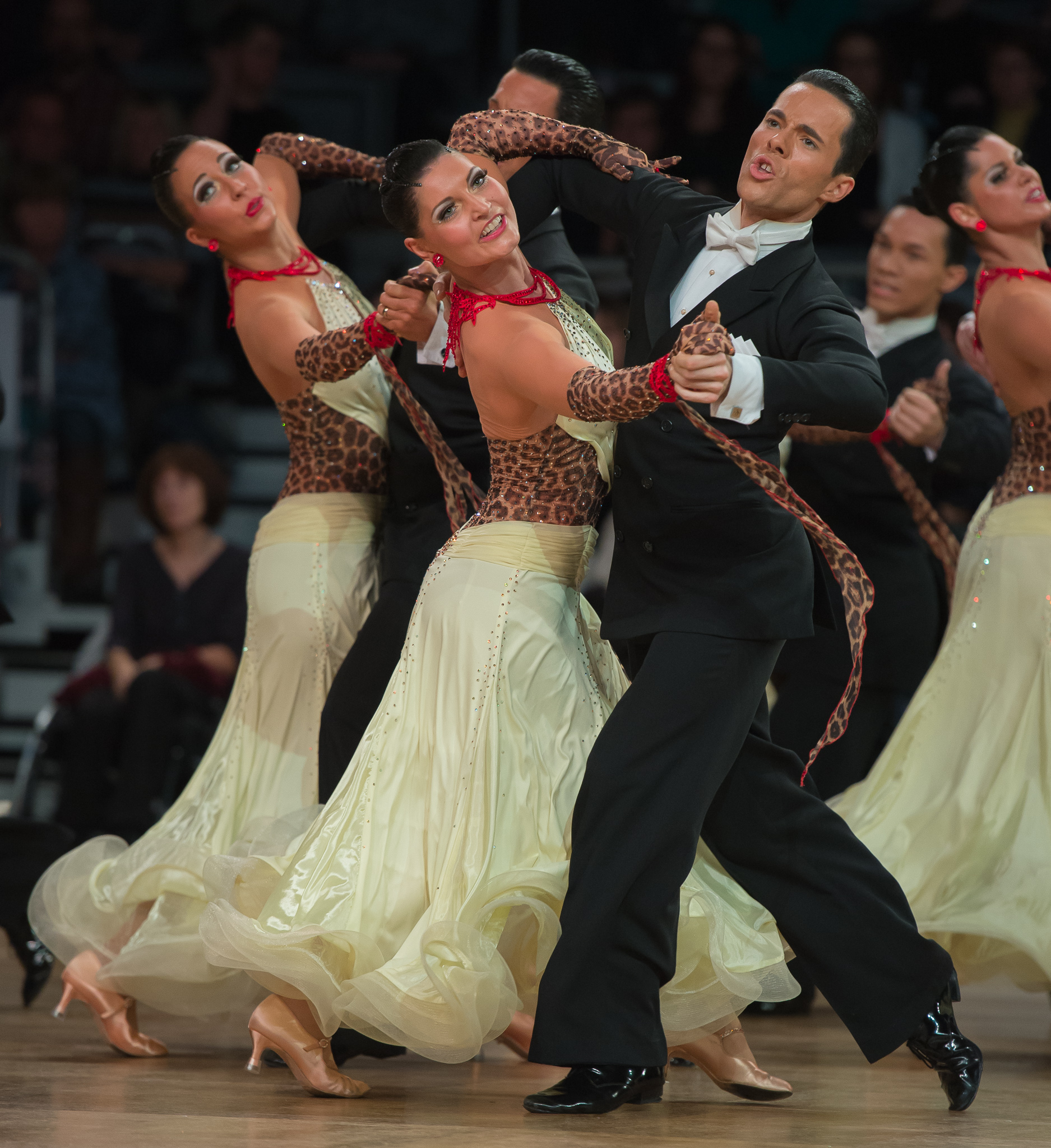
CBM: The man is stepping forward with his left leg while moving the right side of his body forward.

Contra body movement (CBM, sometimes called contrary body movement) is used in ballroom dances, such as waltz, foxtrot, tango, and quickstep. It comprises turning the body (hips and shoulders) against the movement of the legs: either moving forward with the right foot and the left hip and shoulder, or vice versa.

== Creating CBM ==
CBM is turning the right side of the body towards a left moving leg or turning the left side of the body towards a right moving leg. The body and the leg must move at the same time, and not one after the other. CBM occurs on forward or backward steps only (or diagonal steps which still feature forward or backward movement), and not on side steps. Thus, CBM occurs in the following four scenarios:

- The left leg moves forward as the right side of the body moves forward (the torso rotates to the left)
- The left leg moves backward as the right side of the body moves backward (the torso rotates to the right)
- The right leg moves forward as the left side of the body moves forward (the torso rotates to the right)
- The right leg moves backward as the left side of the body moves backward (the torso rotates to the left)

The overall effect and intention of CBM is smooth transition from linear to rotational movement. Thus, CBM is often followed by sway.

== Examples ==
One occurrence of CBM can be observed in a left rock (adlib) turn in American Foxtrot. As the leader takes their second step (the second "slow"), CBM occurs as the right leg moves backward and the left side of the body moves backward, causing the body to begin rotation to the left. Similarly, as the follower takes their second step (the second "slow"), CBM occurs as the left leg moves forward and the right side of the torso moves forward, causing the body to begin rotation to the left.

An exaggerated CBM is the basic of some specific dance moves, e.g., Chicken Walks in Jive and East Coast Swing.

== Contra body movement position (CBMP) ==
Basic directions of step with respect to body position. Here, the left foot is the moving foot and the right foot is the supporting foot. Contra body movement positions are coloured lilac.

Contra body movement position (CBMP, or contrary body movement position) is a position rather than a movement. CBMP is the foot position achieved when the moving foot is placed on or across the line of the standing foot, in front of or behind it.

The term is slightly verbose in an attempt to make it self-describing and to stress the similarity of the dancer's feet position with respect to the body as if a step with CBM was performed.

However, the most important usage of this term in ballroom dancing is to describe steps when a foot moves across the standing foot, while the torso moves in the same direction as the moving foot without rotation. CBMP is routinely used in steps taken in promenade position or outside partner step in order to maintain the relative body position of the couple. CBMP and CBM often occur together in turning steps commenced outside partner or in promenade, but in such case the CBMP is required by the commencing position and is not a result of the turn.

In the ballroom tango, most forward steps of the man's left foot are placed in front of the right foot in CBMP, due to the tango's characteristic compact hold and movement slightly biased towards the right side of the body. Forward steps of the left foot in tango which commence a reverse (left) turn will also utilize CBM in the body in addition to a CBMP foot position.

== See also ==
- Glossary of ballroom dance terms
- List of dances
