= Chassé =

Type of dance step

Chassé in ballet

The chassé (French: [ʃase], French for 'chased'; sometimes anglicized to chasse /ʃæˈseɪ, ʃæs/) is a dance step used in many dances in many variations. All variations are triple-step patterns of gliding character in a "step-together-step" pattern. The word came from ballet terminology.

== Varieties ==
There is a large variety of chasses across many dances. Variations include:

- The direction may be sideways, diagonal or even curving.
- Sizes of steps may vary. This also concerns the second, "Together", step: the moving foot may land right beside the standing foot or leave some space, or even barely move from its previous position.
- Timing may vary. Typical timings in ballroom dances are qqS (1/4, 1/4, 1/2) and SaS ("slow-and-slow", 3/8, 1/8, 1/2).
- Footwork may vary.

The chassé in waltz dancing has several defined forms or figures.

== Ballet ==
A slide with both legs bent either forwards, backwards or sideways and meeting in the air straightened. It can be done either in a gallop (like children pretending to ride a horse) or by pushing the first foot along the floor in a plié and springing into the air where both legs meet stretched.

== Ballroom ==
A number of specific dance variations in the International Style ballroom dances are named "chassé".

- Tipple chassé
- Scatter chassé
- Chassé from promenade position
- Progressive chassé
- Progressive chassé to right
- Turning chassé
- Cross chassé
- Tipsy chassé, also called simply "tipsy"
- Diagonal chassé
- Chassé roll
- Chassé turn
- Quick chassé, a chassé done on count q&q, rather than qqS
- Chassé reverse turn
- Chassés to right and left
- Chassé cape

== Ice dancing or roller dancing ==
In ice dancing, chassés are basic dance steps which appear, for example, in many compulsory dances. The International Skating Union rules define the following variants:

- Simple chassé: a step in which the free foot is placed on the ice beside the skating foot, which is then lifted close to the new skating foot with the blade parallel to the ice. The two steps are skated on the same lobe, usually stepping from outside to inside edge.
- Cross chassé: a chassé in which the free foot is placed on the ice crossing behind the skating foot when skating forward, or in front when skating backward.
- Slide chassé: a chassé in which, instead of lifting the new free foot after the step, it slides off the ice in front when skating forward, or in back when skating backward.

== Line dancing ==
In line dancing the term chassé is used for a triple-step sequence in any direction (forward, side, back, diagonally, or curving). For instance, if the chassé is to be done to the right, the right foot steps right, the left foot is placed next to the right, with the weight being transferred to the left foot so that the right foot can complete the chassé by stepping to the right. The call is usually "step, together, step". The step is often called "the shuffle" by line dancers, but that has several unrelated meanings in other dance contexts.
