= Promenade position =

Dance position

The promenade position (abbreviated as PP in dance diagrams) is a dance position in ballroom and other dances. It is described differently in various dance categories.

== Connection ==
The promenade position is a V-shaped dance position with the leader's right hip and the follower's left hip in contact at the point of the "V", and with the leader's left side and the follower's right side slightly open. The direction of travel is toward the openside.

The leader and follower stand in front of each other in body contact, slightly offset to the left, with the middle of the follower's front connected to the leader's right front. The connection begins at the upper thighs and should continue all of the way up to the middle of the torso. The leader's left hand holds the follower’s right hand, palm to palm in an upper-hand clasp, with fingers and thumbs closed around partner's hand. The leader's right hand must rest on the follower’s back, loosely cupped with fingers and thumb together (not spread apart). The leader's hand connects to her back on her shoulder blade. His wrist should make contact with her underarm at the junction of her arm and body. This connection should not change from the basic closed position. The follower’s left hand and forearm must be on the leader's upper arm. This connection should also not change from the basic closed position.

== Ballroom ==
In ballroom dances their common trait is that when in promenade position, the dance couple moves (or intends to move) essentially sidewise to the leader's left while partners nearly face each other. Steps of both partners are basically sidewise or diagonally forward with respect to their bodies. Normally the dancers look in the direction of the intended movement.

=== International Standard / American Smooth ===
In the International Standard and American Smooth dance categories the promenade position is described as a V-shaped dance position with the leader's right hip and the follower’s left hip in contact at the point of the "V". The dancer's heads face the open portion of the "V". The intended direction of movement is in this direction as well, with some exceptions.

In International Standard, many pota ballroom partners strive to keep their shoulder lines close to parallel throughout a promenade, by means of an internal rotational stretch which is one of the more elusive dance concepts. Some expansion of the hold may often be seen, in the form of the leader stretching diagonally forwards and the follower diagonally back, each of course retaining their own largely independent balance. Diagonal movement across the feet and placement of the step of the inside foot into Contra body movement position may reduce the amount of hip turnout required for free movement. With proper foot usage, no sacrifice of motion is required to maintain this position. At the same time other skilled dancers often sacrifice the "narrowness" of the V-shape in favor of the amount of the progressive movement

Some dance moves started from the PP are Chasse, weave, and several others whose description includes the words "from PP", e.g., "Cross Hesitation from PP".

Some dance moves that may end in the PP are Open Telemark, Chasse

=== Latin / Rhythm ===
International Latin and American Rhythm dance categories usually do not involve the immediate body contact, but the general relative body positions are basically the same as described above, only the shoulder lines may remain parallel, i.e., one usually do not speak of V-shaped bodies position.

Some dance moves that may involve the PP are Botafogos (Samba) and Travelling Spins (Paso Doble).

== Square and line dancing, Country/Western ==
In square dances the promenade is a side-by-side position, with the intention to move together forward. The dancers may use various promenade handholds. Some of them are:

- Basic promenade or Skirt Skater's handhold: The follower extends their left hand horizontally, palm down, across the front of the leader, and leader takes the follower's hand in their left hand. The follower places her right hand at the right side of her waist or slightly behind her right hip, and the leader holds this hand loosely with their right hand. The follower might also use her right hand to hold on to a full skirt with petticoats, sway the skirt in time to the music as a flourish (“skirtwork”), or simply place her hand on her waist. In this case, the leader places their right hand on the small of follower' back.
- Skater’s handhold: Both hands are held in front of the partners at waist-level. The left hands are held in front of the leader’s waist; the right hands are held in front of the follower's waist. The leader’s right arm crosses in front of the follower’s left arm.
- Varsouvienne handhold (also called Shadow, Horseshoe, Cape Position): The leader holds the follower's left hand with his left hand in front of her left shoulder. The leader crosses their right arm behind the follower and holds their right hand with their right hand in front of the follower's right shoulder. The leader's arm is held just above the follower's shoulder.
- Cuddle or Wrap Position (also called Sweetheart or Sweetheart’s Wrap): The leader wraps his right arm around the follower’s waist; the follower wraps their left arm around their front to hold the leader's right hand. The follower wraps their right arm over their left arm and across their front to hold the leader's left hand. Hands are at waist level.

== Lindy Hop ==
In Lindy Hop, the promenade position is often defined similarly to the square dancing version: it is a side-by-side position with the leader's right arm on the follower's right shoulder, see, e.g., Lindy Basic.

== See also ==
- Promenade
- Counter promenade position
