= Arabesque (ballet position) =

Important pose of classical dance

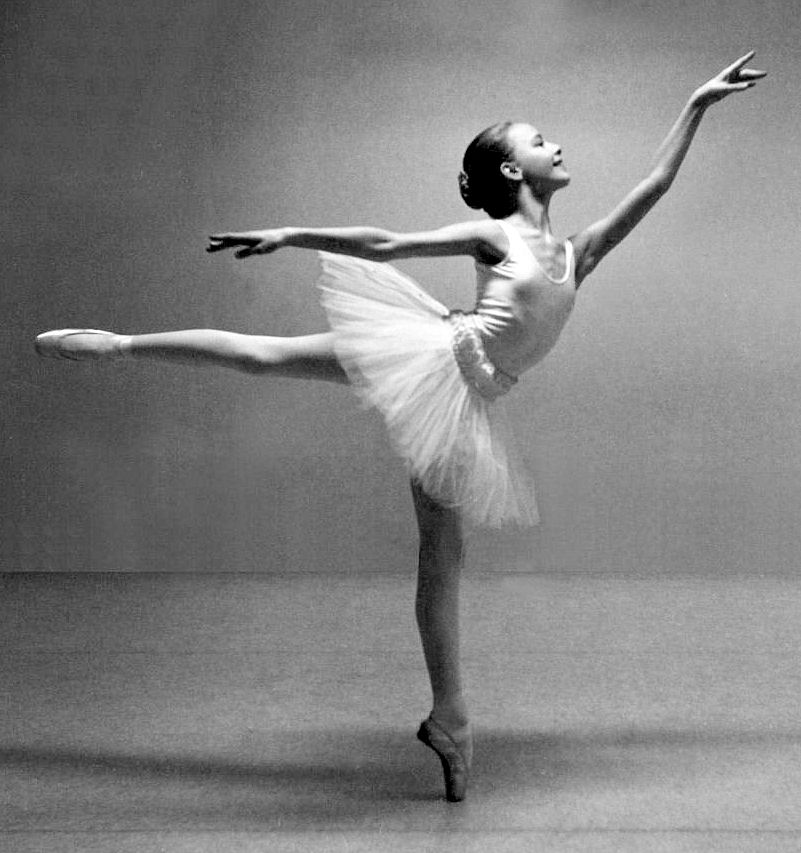
Arabesque position with working leg à la hauteur, forming a 90° angle with supporting leg

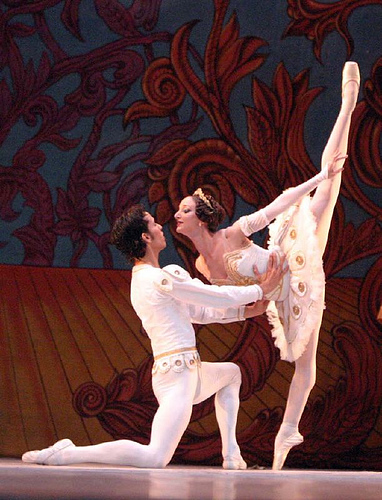
Arabesque penchée

Arabesque (French: [aʁabɛsk]; literally, "in Arabic fashion") in dance, particularly ballet, is a body position in which a dancer stands on one leg–the supporting leg–with the other leg–the working leg–turned out and extended behind the body, with both legs held straight.

In classical ballet, an arabesque can be executed with the supporting leg en pointe or demi pointe or with foot flat on the floor. The working leg may touch the floor in tendu back – an arabesque par terre – or be elevated. Common elevation angles of the raised leg are 45° – à demi hauteur – and 90° – à la hauteur. When the angle is much greater than 90° and the body trunk leans forward to counterbalance the working leg, the position is called arabesque penchée. The arms may be held in various positions. Arabesques are described from the perspective of the dancer, in terms of the stage reference points used by the training system.

== Vaganova ==
Galina Kekisheva, a former soloist of the Kirov Ballet who studied with Agrippina Vaganova at the Leningrad School of Dance has described the changes in Russian ballet technique over time:

Now it seems unimportant in the school if the dancer stands on his or her leg properly pulled up, or sits back into the hip socket. What is important to today's dancers is that the arabesque is higher than the head. There is no low arabesque that maintains a beautiful line, an arabesque from which, for example, you can do a turn. When you're sitting back on the [joint of the standing] leg, you can't go anywhere from there.

Kekisheva, who is now a coach with the Mariinsky Ballet, has said that "Vaganova's method is dissipating, and working in the classical repertoire has become more difficult". In the Vaganova method there are four basic arabesque positions. They are described here for a dancer facing point 8. In class practice, the arms are always level with the shoulders – arabesque de classe, whereas in performance the arm in front may be raised above shoulder level – arabesque de scene. The elbows are always facing downwards.

- In the first arabesque, the dancer stands in effacé position – with the left foot in front – with the right leg raised in arabesque, the right arm extended to the side, to the audience, and the left arm extended front, towards the corner. The gaze follows the line of the arm extended en avant.
- In the second arabesque the legs are like in the first arabesque, but the right arm is extended en avant while the left arm is extended aligned with the dancer's shoulder; the shoulders are in épaulement in line with the arms and the gaze is turned to the audience. The dancer's face is turned toward point one.
- In the third arabesque the dancer stands in croisé position – with the right foot in front – with the left leg raised in arabesque, the right arm extended to the side and a little behind the shoulder, and the left arm extended front. The gaze follows the line of the arm extended en avant.
- In the fourth arabesque position the dancer stands in croisé as for the third arabesque, but the right arm is extended front and the left arm is extended as far back as possible in line with the right arm. The shoulders are in strong épaulement and the dancer's focus is turned to the audience.

=== Technique ===
In arabesque tendue or dégagé, the leg swings from the hip, generally directly forwards or backwards and does not impact aplomb as the back remains straight. Most dancers do not have the ability for their standing leg to rotate out fully to provide the openness for the swinging leg to move fully, therefore the working hip may open without lifting into the lower ribs, while the supporting hip lifts forward over the supporting foot, maintaining a spiral rotation through the hips. Restraining the hip's opening restricts range of motion, restricting the full curvature of the spine (prevents lateral spine rotation). Opening the hip allows dancers with less flexibility to achieve greater range of motion.

When the leg is positioned above 45°, the dancer curves the spine both laterally and vertically. This is done by anchoring the shoulders and scapula downward without tension, with shoulders perpendicular to the direction the dancer is facing. The sternum is lifted without hyper-extending the ribcage. The spine curves to the anterior, with the head lifted and focused straight forward or diagonally upward.

In the Vaganova method, the current standard height and degree for an arabesque is 110°. The supporting and working legs are both fully turned out through the legs (not just from the hips). When performed with open arms, the shoulders are rotated about the spine so as not to affect the position or curvature of the spine.

== Balanchine ==
Suki Schorer has described the Balanchine arabesque as "longer, stronger and bigger". Balanchine would instruct students to "reach for diamonds" in both directions so the dancer's hands are not relaxed—the dancer's line should be elongated, but the arms should not be stiff.

=== Arabesque pliée ===
Schorer says the arabesque pliée "is good to build strength in your legs to control the rate of descent to hold your body up when you land". The dancer's bent knee is over the toe and the dancer should not penchée or tilt forward.

== Royal Academy of Dance ==
In the RAD system, there are three main arabesques. Here they are described for a dancer facing point 6:

- First arabesque is taken standing en ouvert on the right leg with the left leg extended. The right arm is extended forwards at eye height, parallel with the right shoulder. The left arm is at the side, slightly behind and below the left shoulder.
- Second arabesque has a more 'square' feel to it. The dancer stands on their left leg, with their right leg extended. The right arm is extended forwards at shoulder height, and the left arm is extended directly sideways from the shoulder. This can also be taken en ouvert, standing on the right leg and extending the left arm forwards.
- Third arabesque is taken en ouvert. The dancer stands on their right leg, with their left leg extended behind. The right arm is extended forwards at eye height, and the left arm is extended parallel to it at shoulder height.

== Classical choreography ==
The "Shades scene" from La Bayadère, choreographed by Marius Petipa, is one of the masterpieces of classical style. It opens with a corps de ballet of 28 female dancers, dressed in white performing a simple arabesque as they make their entrance one by one.
