= Sway (dance) =

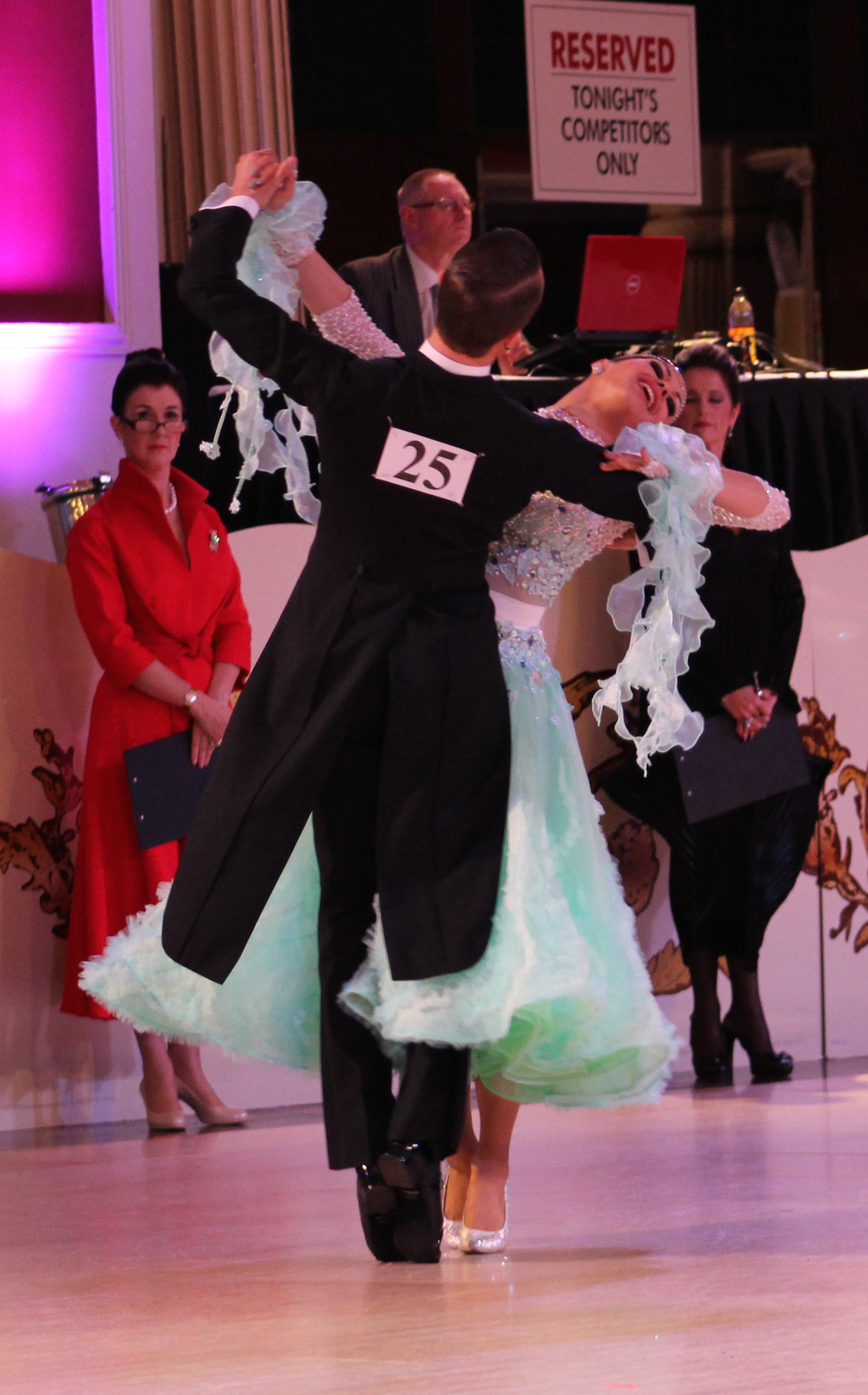
Sway to the right from the man's point of view, who has come from the right side and just arrived on his left foot

The term sway has a specific meaning in the technique of ballroom dances. Sway describes a dancer's body position in which the entire body gracefully deflects from the vertical, normally away from the standing foot and the direction of movement. Entrance to and exit from this position are matters of fine technical detail and differ in various dance figures.

Sway may be an element of both stationary and moving dance figures. In moving figures, sway is commonly achieved as a natural result of body swing, but small amounts from other sources may be useful as an inflection. Sway comes primarily from an incline of the entire body, but a portion may also come from gradual bending of the trunk. It is customary to consider any bending of the trunk to occur more as a stretching of one side of the rib cage more than as a compression of the other side. This description helps to produce sway without the body line breaking awkwardly at the waist. Substantial abdominal strength may be needed to fully utilize this technique.

Possible angles of sway range from having the upper body substantially trailing the lower through a movement, to having the upper body a very small amount in advance. The purposes of sway are both better control of dance motion and aesthetics.

== See also ==
- Glossary of partner dance terms
