= Natural and reverse turns =

Dance step

A natural turn is a dance step in which the partners turn around a common center clockwise. Its near-mirror counterpart is the reverse turn, which is turning counter-clockwise.

This terminology is used mainly in the "International Standard" group of ballroom dances. "Natural turn" and "reverse turn" are names of syllabus figures in waltz, Viennese waltz, foxtrot, quickstep. In addition, the words "natural" and "reverse" are used in some other figures that amount to turning to the right or left, respectively, e.g. natural twist turn in tango and foxtrot.

The name "natural" has two explanations. In a standard ballroom closed dance position the partners are somewhat shifted to the left with respect to each other, which makes the right turn easier. The second reason is related to progress around the floor along the counter-clockwise line of dance. Turning to the right is partly compensated for by the line of dance's leftward curve, so that it takes less effort to stay on line of dance while turning to the right than while using opposite footwork and turning to the left, especially at the corners.

== Natural turn ==
Leader (man)

| Beat | Foot position | Alignment | Amount of turn | Footwork |
|---|---|---|---|---|
| 1 | Right foot forward | Facing diagonal wall | Begin to turn right | Heel – toe |
| 2 | Left foot side | Backing diagonal center | 1/4 between 1 and 2 | Toe |
| 3 | Right foot closes to left foot | Backing line of dance | 1/8 between 2 and 3 | Toe – heel |
| 4 | Left foot back | Backing line of dance | Begin to turn right | Toe – heel |
| 5 | Right foot side | Pointing diagonal center | 3/8 between 4 and 5, body turns less | Toe |
| 6 | Left foot closes to right foot | Facing diagonal center | Body completes turn | Toe – heel |

Follower (lady)

| Beat | Foot position | Alignment | Amount of turn | Footwork |
|---|---|---|---|---|
| 1 | Left foot back | Backing diagonal wall | Begin to turn right | Toe – heel |
| 2 | Right foot side | Pointing line of dance | 3/8 between 1 and 2 (body turns less) | Toe |
| 3 | Left foot closes to right foot | Facing line of dance | Body completes turn | Toe – heel |
| 4 | Right foot forward | Facing line of dance | Begin to turn right | Heel – toe |
| 5 | Left foot side | Backing center | 1/4 between 4 and 5 | Toe |
| 6 | Right foot closes to left foot | Backing diagonal center | 1/8 between 5 and 6 | Toe – heel |

=== Other "natural" figures ===
- Natural spin turn
- Natural pivot turn
- Natural promenade turn
- Natural twist turn
- Natural ronde turn
- Fallaway natural turn
- Natural weave
- Natural Telemark
- Natural hover Telemark
- Natural zig-zag
- Natural hover
- Natural lock hover
- Natural hover whisk
- Natural fallaway whisk
- Natural fallaway
- Natural hairpin
- Natural top
- Natural opening out
- Natural roll
- Natural basic movement (I.S. samba)
- Impetus is a basic natural-turning figure as well
- Natural fleckerl

== Reverse turn ==
Leader (man)

| Beat | Foot position | Alignment | Amount of turn | Footwork |
|---|---|---|---|---|
| 1 | Left foot forward | Facing diagonal center | Begin to turn left | Heel – toe |
| 2 | Right foot side | Backing digonal wall | 1/4 between 1 and 2 | Toe |
| 3 | Left foot closes to right foot | Backing line of dance | 1/8 between 2 and 3 | Toe – heel |
| 4 | Right foot back | Backing line of dance | Begin to turn left | Toe – heel |
| 5 | Left foot side | Pointing diagonal wall | 3/8 between 4 and 5, body turns less | Toe |
| 6 | Right foot closes to left foot | Facing diagonal wall | Body completes turn | Toe – heel |

Follower (lady)

| Beat | Foot position | Alignment | Amount of turn | Footwork |
|---|---|---|---|---|
| 1 | Right foot back | Backing diagonal center | Begin to turn left | Toe – heel |
| 2 | Left foot side | Pointing line of dance | 3/8 between 1 and 2 (body turns less) | Toe |
| 3 | Right foot closes to left foot | Facing line of dance | Body completes turn | Toe – heel |
| 4 | Left foot forward | Facing line of dance | Begin to turn left | Heel – toe |
| 5 | Right foot side | Backing wall | 1/4 between 4 and 5 | Toe |
| 6 | Left foot closes to right foot | Backing diagonal wall | 1/8 between 5 and 6 | Toe – heel |

=== Other "reverse" figures ===
- Chasse reverse turn
- Open reverse turn
- Pivot reverse turn
- Basic reverse turn
- Checked reverse turn
- Reverse corte
- Reverse pivot
- Fallaway reverse
- Reverse wave
- Double reverse spin
- Quick open reverse
- Reverse top
- Natural basic movement (I.S. samba)
- Double reverse wing
- Swivel reverse
- Reverse lock (turn)
- Telemark is a basic reverse-turning figure as well
- Reverse barrel roll
- Reverse fleckerl
