= Quickstep =

Ballroom dance

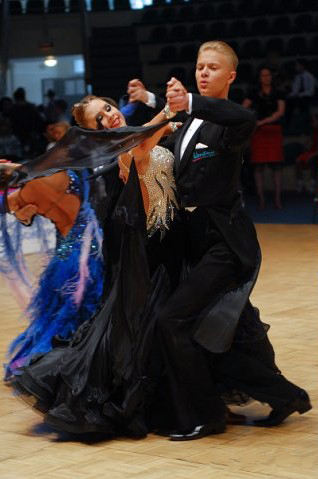
Quickstep

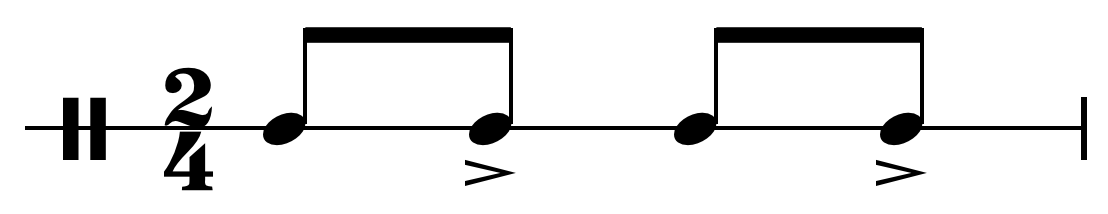
"Quick Step" dance rhythm figure.

The quickstep is a light-hearted dance of the standard ballroom dances. The movement of the dance is fast and powerfully flowing and sprinkled with syncopations. The upbeat melodies that quickstep is danced to make it suitable for both formal and informal events. Its origins are in combination of slow foxtrot combined with the Charleston, a dance which was one of the precursors to what today is called swing dancing.

== History ==
The quickstep evolved in the 1920s from a combination of the foxtrot, Charleston, shag, peabody, and one-step. The dance is English in origin and was standardized in 1927. While it evolved from the foxtrot, the quickstep now is quite separate. Unlike the modern foxtrot, the leader often closes his feet, and syncopated steps are regular occurrences (as was the case in early foxtrot). Three characteristic dance figures of the quickstep are the chassés, where the feet are brought together, the quarter turns, and the lock step.^{p126}

This dance gradually evolved into a very dynamic one with much movement on the dance floor, with many advanced patterns including hops, runs, quick steps with much momentum, and rotation. The tempo of quickstep dance is rather brisk, as it was developed to ragtime era jazz music, which is fast-paced when compared to other dance music.

By the end of the 20th century the complexity of quickstep as done by advanced dancers had increased, with the extensive use of syncopated steps with eighth note durations. While in older times quickstep patterns were counted with "quick" (one beat) and "slow" (two beats) steps, many advanced patterns today are cued with split beats, such as "quick-and-quick-and-quick, quick, slow", with there being further steps on the 'and's.

== Style ==
The quickstep is elegant like the foxtrot and should be smooth and glamorous. The dancers should appear to be very light on their feet. It is very energetic and form-intensive. The quickstep is danced to 4/4 music of 48 to 52 measures per minute.

== Syllabus ==
The two International Style syllabi of ISTD and IDTA for quickstep differ very little.

The American Style dance competition program does not include quickstep, but a limited version of the dance is taught and danced socially in some American dance venues.

=== Pre-bronze ===
1. Quarter turn to right
2. Natural turn
3. Natural turn with hesitation
4. Natural pivot turn
5. Natural spin turn
6. Progressive chassé
7. Chassé reverse turn
8. Forward lock
9. Heel pivot (quarter turn to left)

=== Silver ===
1. Quick open reverse
2. Fishtail
3. Running right turn
4. Four quick run
5. V6
6. Closed telemark

=== Gold ===
1. Cross swivel
2. Six quick run
3. Rumba cross
4. Tipsy to right
5. Tipsy to left
6. Hover corté

== In popular culture ==
The quickstep is one of multiple dances performed on the celebrity talent show Dancing with the Stars, as well as Strictly Come Dancing.
