= Dance move =

One, self-contained, planned sequence of movements while dancing

Dance moves or dance steps (more complex dance moves are called dance patterns, dance figures, dance movements, or dance variations) are usually isolated, defined, and organized so that beginning dancers can learn and use them independently of each other. However, more complex movements are influenced by musicality and lyrical relevance to express emotions or refer to a message. Dance moves tend to emphasize the concepts of lead and follow and connection.

In most cases, dance moves by themselves are independent of musicality, which is the appropriateness of a move to the music (for a notable exception, see Bharatanatyam). Generally, they are memorized in sets of eight counts. Also there are two different movements: concrete and abstract. These two movements show time, space, relationship, quality and focus. For example, relationship could describe the movement of two or more different dancers. The names of moves may be somewhat arbitrary and vary from person to person and city to city.

== Techniques ==
"A line dance move is made up of a number of movements called steps. Each step is given a name so teachers can tell dancers to perform this step when teaching a dance move. The most well known is the grapevine (or vine for short), a four-count movement to the side."

In ballroom dancing a "dance move" is defined as, or requires, the shifting of one's body weight from one foot to the other in time to the music. "Dancing is stepping in time to the beats of the music. ... In addition to steps, there are also dance movements, such as toe touches, kicks, and hops." Some genres, such as ballet, have, "a clear repertoire of dance steps," thus different types of dance may be characterized by their differing and shared steps. Each dance emphasizes its own moves, but often moves are shared by several dances. The steps of a dance or pattern may be listed in a step sheet.

Dance patterns may be described by difficulty. Dance patterns may be described according to combinations of quick and slow steps and often by the rhythm or meter of the music, for example waltz steps (three-count step patterns danced to waltz music), swing steps (four-count patterns danced to swing music), polka steps (four-count patterns danced to polka music), and shuffle steps (four-count Texas Shuffle/foxtrot patterns). This may be because, "dance patterns are choreographed to fit an even distribution of musical beats and measures." Moves may also be described by physical technique, for example most tap moves use landings in point/demi-point (weight on the balls of one's foot or feet) positions with the knees tightly extended while in ballet jump landings are demi-plié (knees bent outward), most elements of Irish dancing occur in the sagittal plane. Different dance moves cause different stresses on different parts of the body of the dancer performing the moves, for example tap, Irish, and ballet moves cause repeated pounding to the balls of the feet while demi-plié jump landings cause shock to be absorbed through the knees as well as through the balls of the feet.

== See also ==
- Glossary of dance moves
- Glossary of ballet
- Glossary of belly dance terms
- Sprinkler (dance)
