= Music history of the United States in the 1980s =

Popular music of the United States in the 1980s saw heavy metal, country music, Top 40 hits, hip hop, MTV, CMJ, and new wave as mainstream. Punk rock and hardcore punk was popular on CMJ. With the demise of punk rock, a new generation of punk-influenced genres arose, including Gothic rock, post-punk, alternative rock, emo and thrash metal. Hip hop underwent its first diversification, with Miami bass, Chicago hip house, Washington, D.C. go-go, Detroit ghettotech, Los Angeles G-funk and the "golden age of old school hip hop" in New York City. House music developed in Chicago, techno music developed in Detroit which also saw the flowering of the Detroit Sound in gospel. This helped inspire the greatest crossover success of Christian Contemporary Music (CCM), as well as the Miami Sound of Cuban pop.

== Pop ==
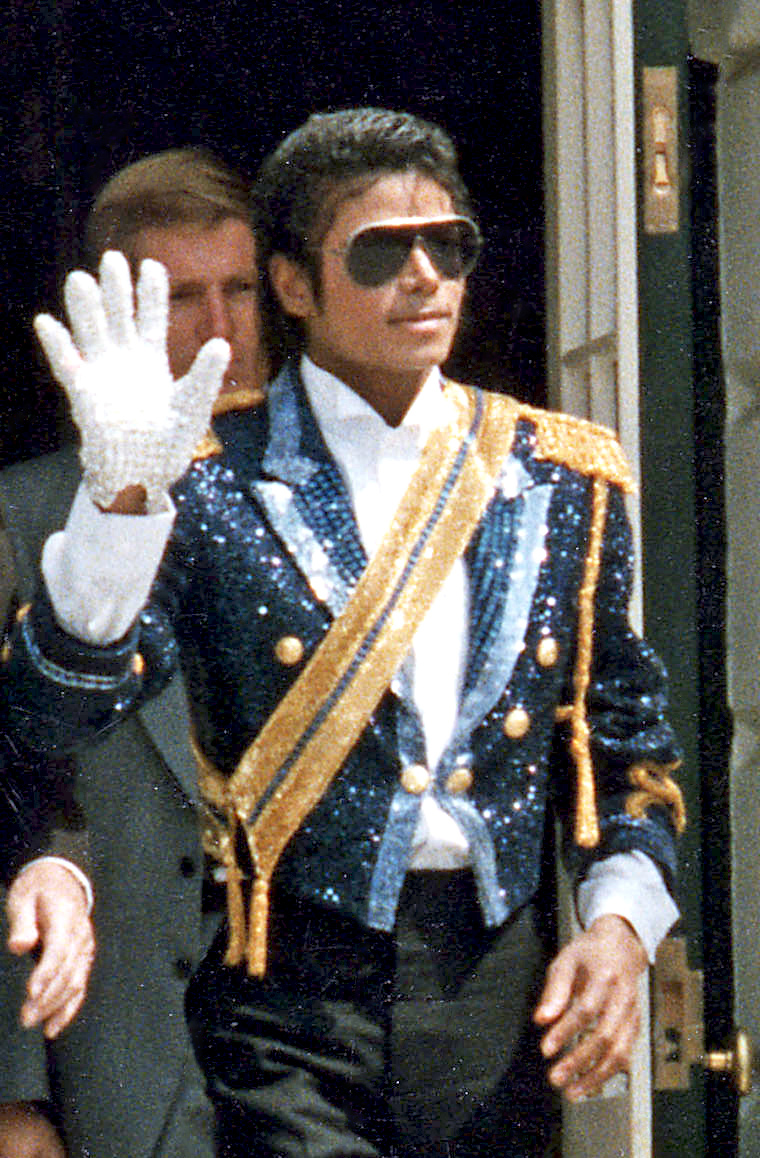
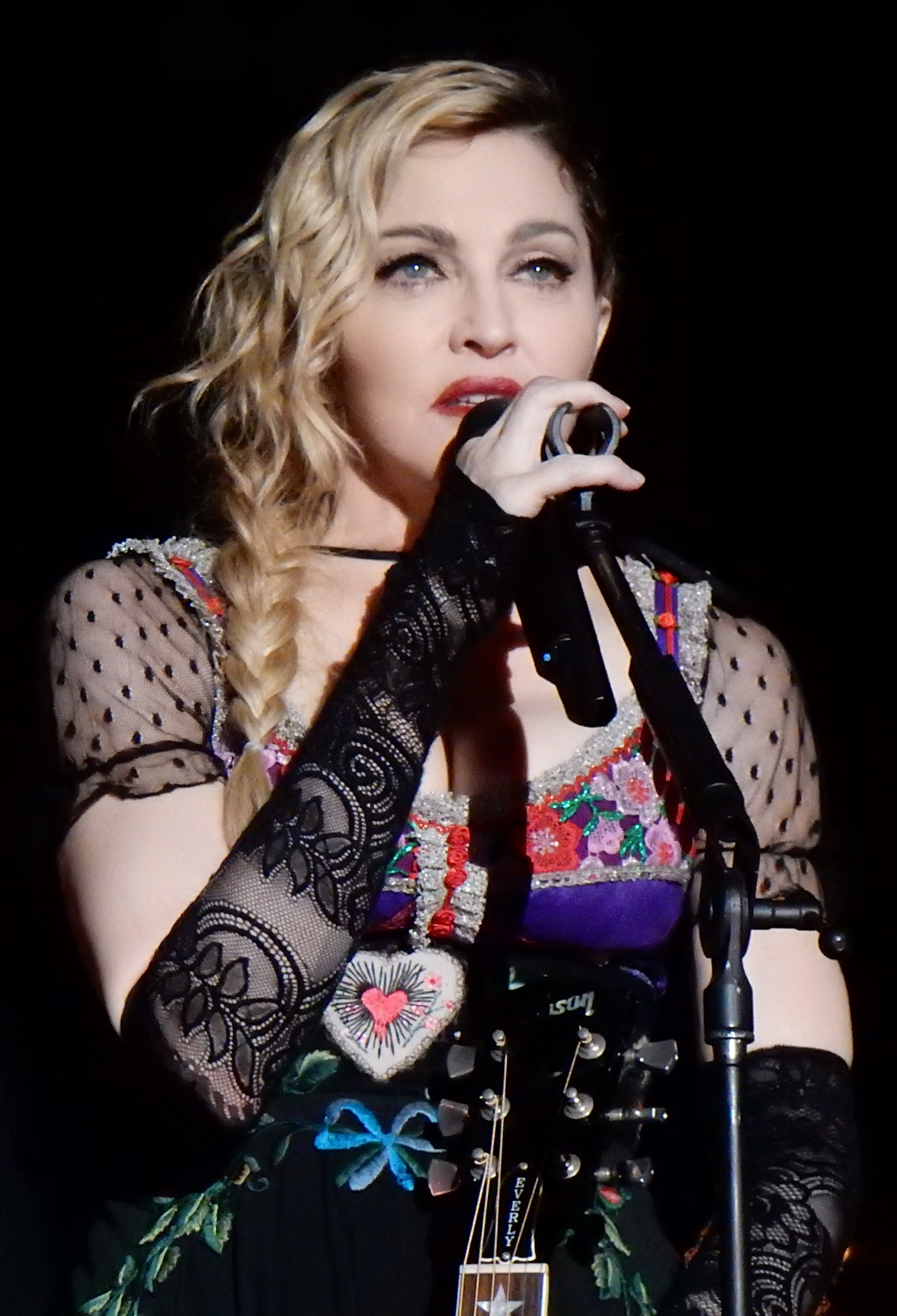
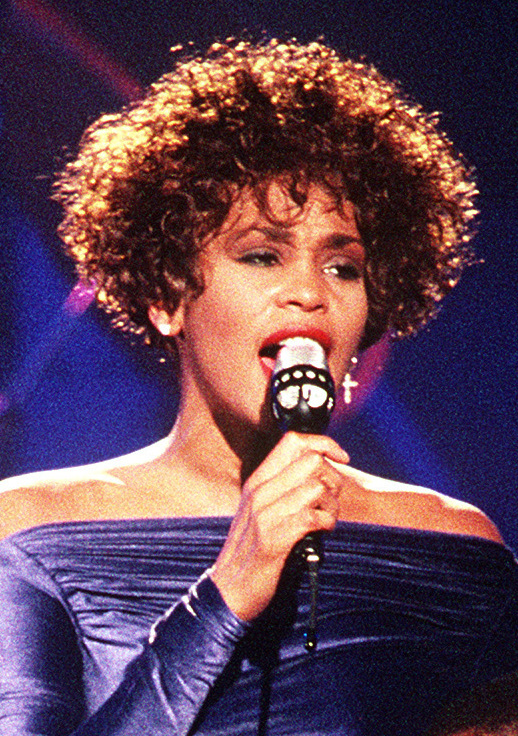
Michael Jackson (left), Madonna (center) and Whitney Houston (right) are among the most successful musicians of the 1980s.

The 1980s saw the reinvention of Michael Jackson and the emergence and superstardom of Prince, Madonna and Whitney Houston. Their videos became a permanent fixture on MTV. In 1983 Michael Jackson became the first African American artist to be placed in heavy rotation on MTV, with his videos for Billie Jean, and Beat It. Donna Summer also had the first two videos She Works Hard for the Money and Unconditional Love, by an African American female artist in 1983. Michael Jackson's Thriller album from 1982 is considered to be the best-selling album of all time; it set a record and sold 20 million copies during the decade. His other album of the decade, 1987's Bad, sold 6 million, and became the first album to have 5 number-one hits on the Billboard Hot 100. Jackson scored 9 #1 singles and 16 top 10 singles on the Billboard charts. Madonna scored 7 #1 singles, and 16 top 5 singles, and 17 top 10 singles. Whitney Houston is the only artist to have seven consecutive number-one singles on the US Billboard Hot 100 chart, from "Saving All My Love for You" in 1985 to "Where Do Broken Hearts Go" in 1988. Her first two studio albums, Whitney Houston (1985) and Whitney (1987), both peaked at number one on the Billboard 200 and are among the best-selling albums of all time. Prince's 1984 album Purple Rain spent six consecutive months atop the Billboard 200.

By 1980, the disco production of the 1970s, largely dependent on orchestras, is replaced by a lighter synthpop production. In the second half of the 1980s teen pop has its first wave. Bands and artists include New Kids on the Block, Debbie Gibson, Tiffany, New Edition, Stacey Q, The Bangles, Madonna and others.

Prominent American urban pop acts of the 1980s include Tina Turner, Lionel Richie, Michael Jackson, Whitney Houston, Donna Summer and Diana Ross.

Whitney Houston, Michael Jackson, Madonna, Bruce Springsteen, Hall and Oates, Billy Joel, John Mellencamp, Bon Jovi, Prince, Kool & the Gang, the Pointer Sisters and Kenny Rogers were among the most successful artists on the Billboard Hot 100 chart in the US. Prince was the top charting artist with 378 weeks on the pop charts, and Billy Joel was the top selling, he sold over 35 million albums.

Many British pop bands dominated the American charts in the early 1980s. Their popularity was helped by exposure on MTV, these bands included the Human League, Culture Club, Duran Duran, Wham!, also George Michael as a solo artist, Fine Young Cannibals, Rick Astley and Terence Trent D'Arby.

Canadian artist such as Bryan Adams, Anne Murray, Loverboy and Glass Tiger found chart success during the decade.

Smooth Jazz gained popularity during the decade with successful acts such as Sade, Kenny G.

== Rock ==
=== Hard rock and heavy / glam metal ===
Beginning in 1983 and peaking in success in 1986–1989, the decade saw the resurgence of hard rock music and the emergence of its glam metal subgenre. Bands such as Def Leppard, Mötley Crüe, Bon Jovi, Quiet Riot, Europe, Ratt, Twisted Sister, Poison, Whitesnake, and Cinderella were among the most popular acts of the decade. The 1980s saw the emergence of wildly popular hard rock band Guns N' Roses and the successful comebacks of Aerosmith and Alice Cooper in the late 1980s. The success of hard rock act Van Halen spanned throughout the entire decade, first with singer David Lee Roth and later with Sammy Hagar. Queen, which had expanded its music to experimental and crossover genres in the early 1980s, returned to guitar-driven hard rock with The Miracle in 1989. Additionally, a few women managed to achieve stardom in the 1980s' hard rock scene: Pat Benatar and Ann & Nancy Wilson of Heart, who had been around since the 1970s, is a prime example of female success in hard rock, and so are both ex-Runaways Joan Jett and Lita Ford.

The Arena rock trend of the 1970s continued in the 1980s with bands like Styx, Toto, Rush, Journey, Boston, Foreigner, REO Speedwagon, Van Halen, and Aerosmith which were popular into the early 1980s, with glam metal taking their place later.

Traditionally associated (and often confused) with Hard rock, heavy metal was also extremely popular throughout the decade, with Ozzy Osbourne achieving success during his solo career; bands like Judas Priest, Iron Maiden and Dio were also widely popular North American acts. Speed metal pioneer Motörhead maintained its popularity through the releases of several albums. Underground scenes produced an array of more extreme, aggressive Metal subgenres: thrash metal broke into the mainstream with bands such as Metallica, Slayer, Anthrax, and Megadeth, while other styles like death metal and black metal remaining subcultural phenomena.

The decade also saw the emergence of a string of guitar virtuosi, influenced by guitarists such as Jimi Hendrix and Eddie Van Halen; Joe Satriani, Steve Vai and Yngwie Malmsteen achieved international recognition for their skills. While considerably less numerous, bass guitar virtuosi also gained momentum in the 1980s : Billy Sheehan (of David Lee Roth and Mr. Big fame), Cliff Burton (of Metallica) and alternative/funk metal bassist Les Claypool (of Primus fame) became famous during that period.

Both hard rock and heavy metal were extremely popular live genres and bands toured extensively around the globe.

=== Alternative rock ===
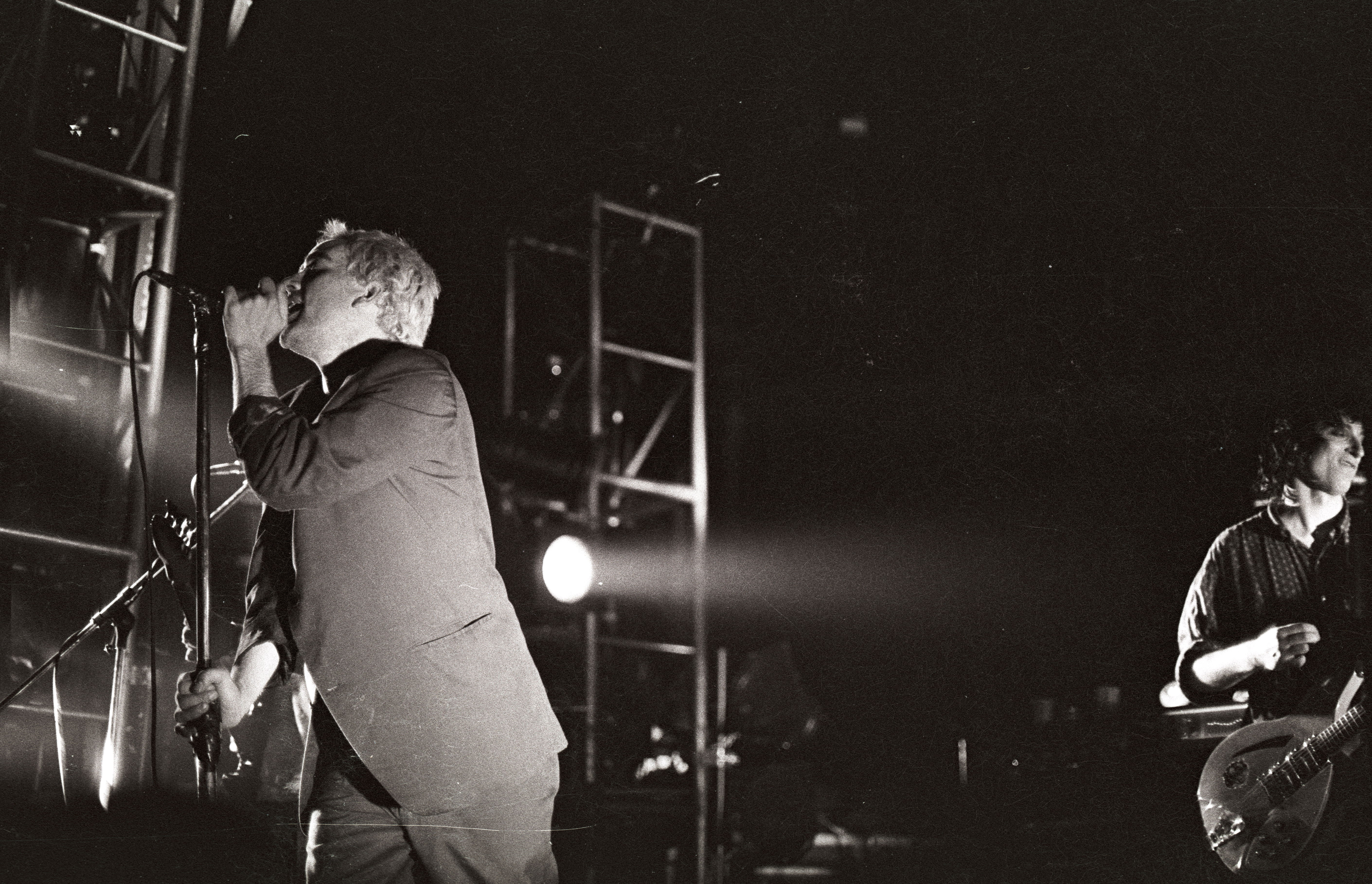
One of the first popular alternative rock bands, R.E.M. relied on college radio airplay, constant touring, and a grassroots fanbase to break into the musical mainstream.

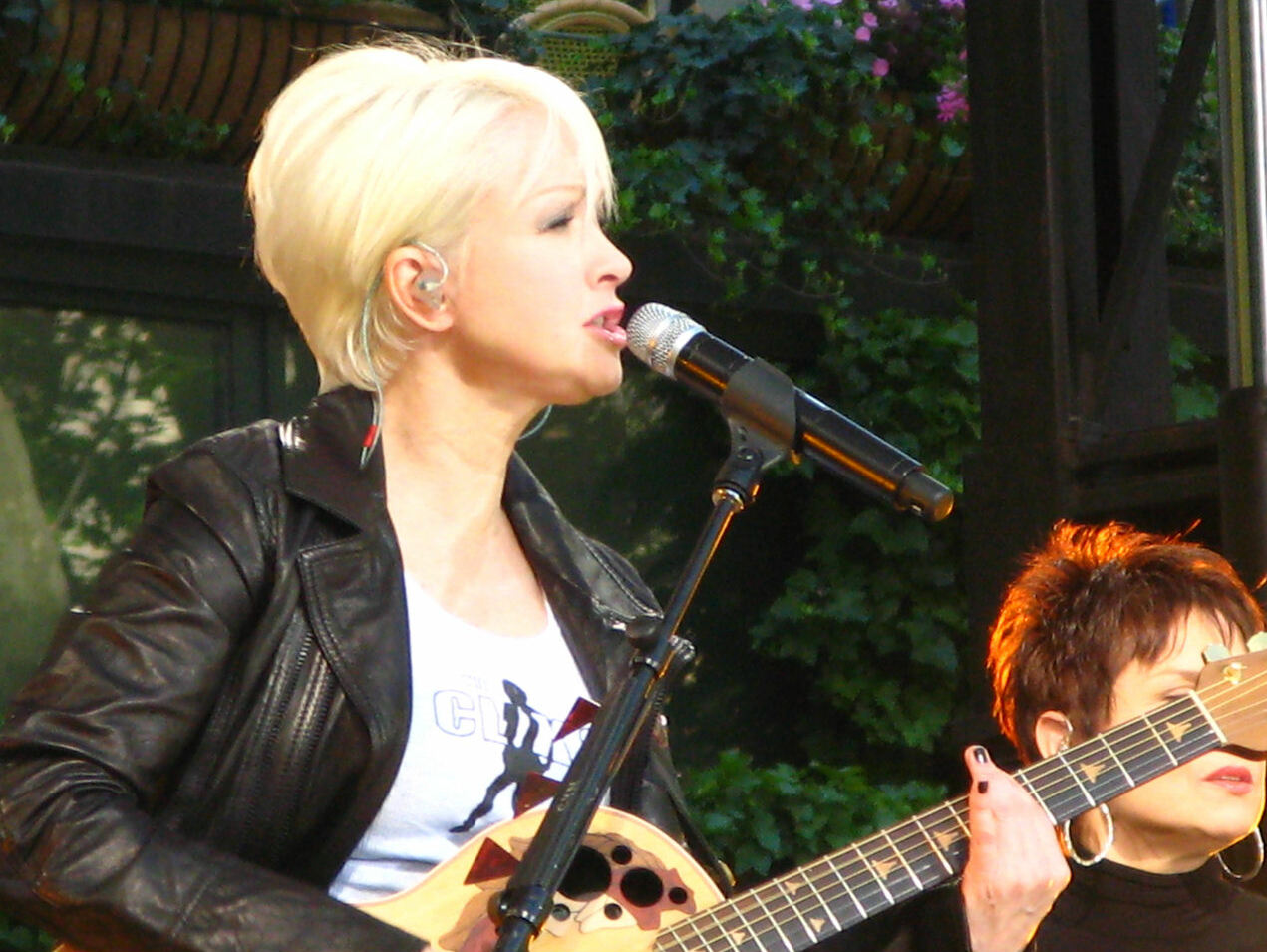
Cyndi Lauper was called the "Voice of the MTV Generation."

Alternative rock and punk groups from the 1970s like Ramones and Talking Heads, as well as solo performers like Patti Smith and Tom Waits, grew their audiences significantly the early years of the 1980s. By 1984, a majority of groups signed to independent record labels were mining from a variety of rock and particularly 1960s rock influences. This represented a sharp break from the futuristic, hyper rational post-punk years.

Throughout the 1980s, alternative rock was mainly an underground phenomena. While on occasion a song would become a commercial hit or albums would receive critical praise in mainstream publications like Rolling Stone, alternative rock in the 1980s was primarily relegated to independent record labels, fanzines, and college radio stations. Alternative bands built underground followings by touring constantly and regularly releasing low-budget albums. In the case of the United States, new bands would form in the wake of previous bands, which created an extensive underground circuit in America, filled with different scenes in various parts of the country. Although American alternative artists of the 1980s never generated spectacular album sales, they exerted a considerable influence on later alternative musicians and laid the groundwork for their success.

Early American alternative bands such as R.E.M., The Feelies, and Violent Femmes combined punk influences with folk music and mainstream music influences. R.E.M. was the most immediately successful; its debut album, Murmur (1983), entered the Top 40 and spawned a number of jangle pop followers.

American indie record labels SST Records, Twin/Tone Records, Touch and Go Records, and Dischord Records presided over the shift from the hardcore punk that then dominated the American underground scene to the more diverse styles of alternative rock that were emerging. Minnesota bands Hüsker Dü and The Replacements were indicative of this shift. Both started out as punk rock bands, but soon diversified their sounds and became more melodic.

By the late 1980s, the American alternative scene was dominated by styles ranging from quirky alternative pop (They Might Be Giants and Camper Van Beethoven), to noise rock (Sonic Youth, Big Black) to industrial rock (Ministry, Nine Inch Nails). These sounds were in turn followed by the advent of Boston's the Pixies and Los Angeles' Jane's Addiction.

The top mainstream American Alternative Rock bands of 1980s included Hüsker Dü, The Replacements, R.E.M., The Pixies, and Sonic Youth which were popular long before the Grunge movement of the early 1990s. Many alternative groups whose success peaked in the following decade started their careers in the 1980s, including The Flaming Lips, Nirvana, and Yo La Tengo.

=== Folk rock, roots rock ===
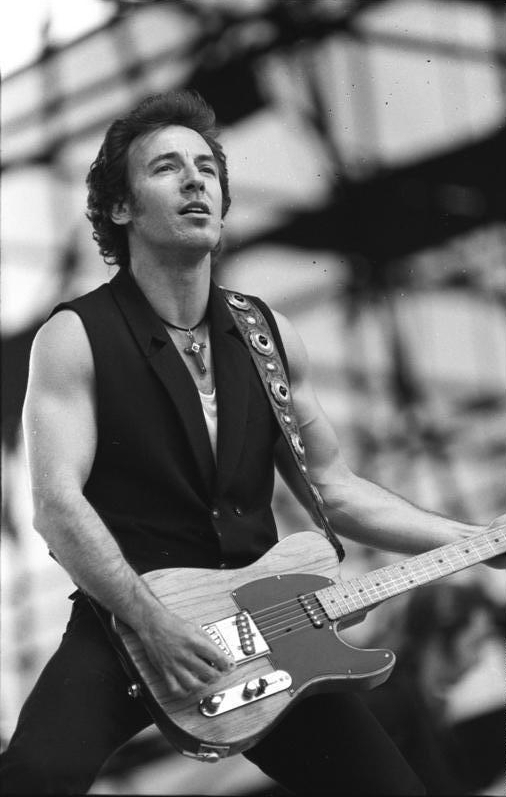
Bruce Springsteen, 1988

Rock singers and songwriters appeared including Heartland rockers such as Bruce Springsteen, Tom Petty, Bob Seger, and folk rockers such as Lucinda Williams, Rickie Lee Jones, Stevie Nicks and Warren Zevon. Roots rocker John Fogerty had hit "Old Man Down the Road" in 1985. Punk rock artists such as Patti Smith and Paul Westerberg(The Replacements) were popular as singers and songwriters.

In the late 1980s, new history of female U.S. folk artists was beginning with Suzanne Vega whose first album sold unexpectedly well. And Tracy Chapman, Nanci Griffith, k.d. lang and Tori Amos followed Suzanne Vega.

=== Other trends ===
Various older rock bands made a comeback, including The Beach Boys with "Kokomo", The Kinks with Come Dancing and "Do It Again", the Steve Miller Band with "Abracadabra", and Steely Dan with "Hey Nineteen". Bruce Springsteen released his blockbuster album Born In The U.S.A., while Stevie Ray Vaughan and George Thorogood sparked a revival of blues. However, Led Zeppelin disbanded after John Bonham's 1980 death. Linda Ronstadt who had been a huge contributor to the country rock & pop rock movement of the 70s, did 3 albums of American Standards, coaxing the great orchestrator Nelson Riddle out of retirement, to collaborate with.

Hardcore punk flourished throughout the early to mid-1980s, with bands leading the genre such as Black Flag, Bad Brains, Minor Threat, Suicidal Tendencies, amongst others.

== Contemporary R&B ==
Contemporary R&B originated in the 1980s, when musicians started adding disco-like beats, high-tech production, and elements of hip hop, soul and funk to rhythm and blues, making it more danceable and modern. The top mainstream R&B artists of 1980s included Whitney Houston, Michael Jackson, Prince, Jermaine Jackson, The Whispers, The S.O.S. Band, Stevie Wonder, Kool & the Gang, Yarbrough and Peoples, Smokey Robinson, Rick James, Diana Ross, Lionel Richie, Earth, Wind & Fire, Dazz Band, Evelyn King, Marvin Gaye, Mtume, DeBarge, Midnight Star, Karyn White and Freddie Jackson.

In the mid-1980s, many of the recordings by artists Luther Vandross, Freddie Jackson, Sade, Anita Baker, Teddy Pendergrass, Peabo Bryson and others became known as quiet storm. The term had originated with Smokey Robinson's 1975 album A Quiet Storm. Quiet storm has been described as "R&B's answer to soft rock and adult contemporary—while it was primarily intended for black audiences, quiet storm had the same understated dynamics, relaxed tempos and rhythms, and romantic sentiment."

Tina Turner made a comeback in the mid 1980s, while Donna Summer, Diana Ross and The Pointer Sisters continued to have success on the pop charts, in the first half of the decade, Whitney Houston, Janet Jackson and Jody Watley scored hits on the pop music charts in the second half of the 80s. Richard J. Ripani wrote that Janet Jackson's third studio album Control (1986) was "important to the development of R&B for a number of reasons", as she and her producers, Jimmy Jam and Terry Lewis, "crafted a new sound that fuses the rhythmic elements of funk and disco, along with heavy doses of synthesizers, percussion, sound effects, and a rap music sensibility." Ripani wrote that "the success of Control led to the incorporation of stylistic traits of rap over the next few years, and Janet Jackson was to continue to be one of the leaders in that development." That same year, Teddy Riley began producing R&B recordings that included hip hop influences. This combination of R&B style and hip hop rhythms was termed new jack swing, and was applied to artists such as Bobby Brown, Keith Sweat, Guy, Jodeci, and Bell Biv DeVoe.

Michael Jackson remained a prominent figure in the genre in the late 1980s, following the release of his album Bad (1987) which sold more than 6 million copies in the US in the 80s, and went on the sell 30 million worldwide. Janet Jackson's 1989 album Janet Jackson's Rhythm Nation 1814 continued the development of contemporary R&B into the 1990s, as the album's title track "Rhythm Nation" made "use of elements from across the R&B spectrum, including use of a sample loop, triplet swing, rapped vocal parts and blues notes."

== Hip hop ==
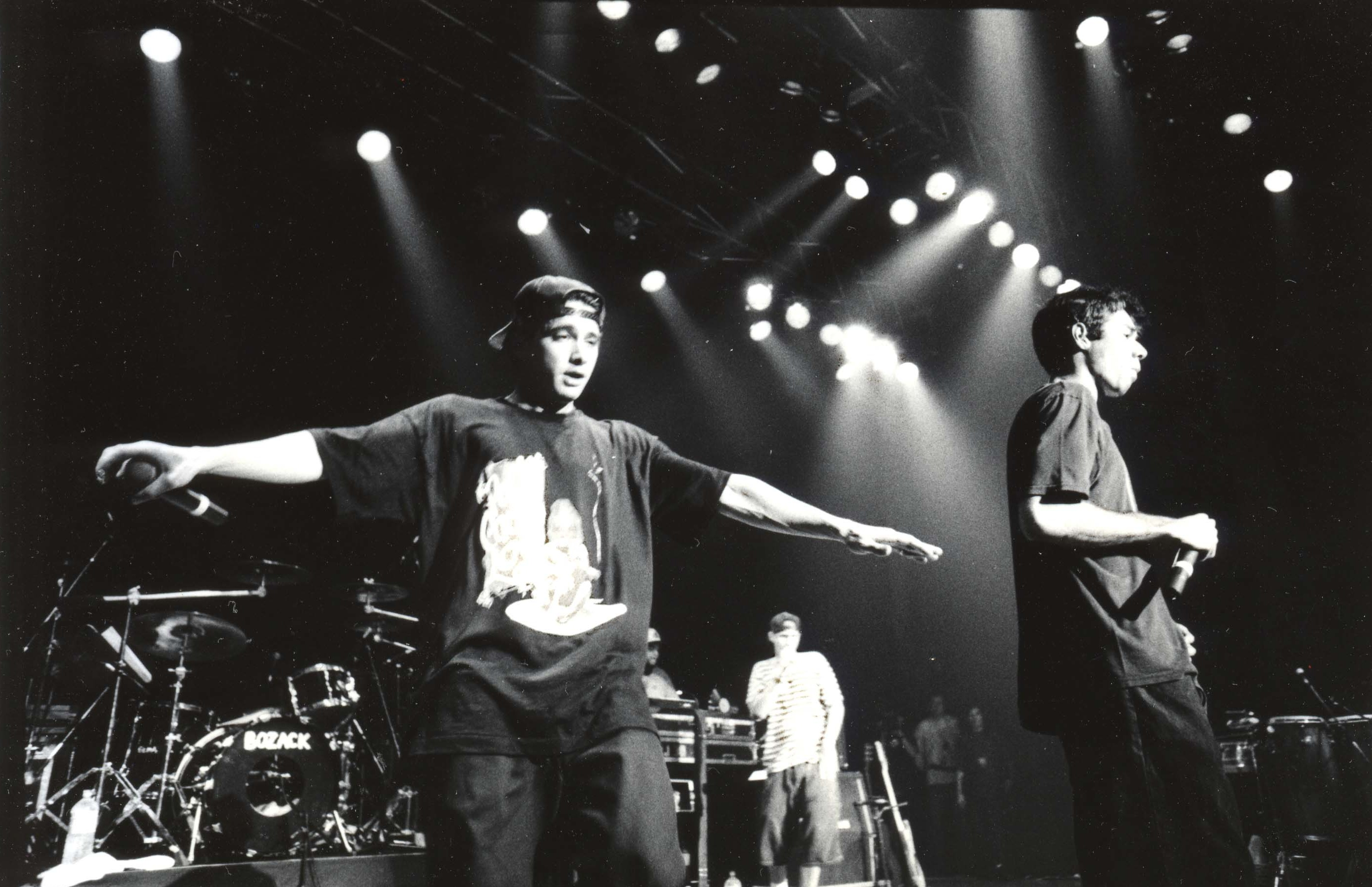
Beastie Boys, 1992

Encompassing graffiti art, break dancing, rap music, and fashion, hip-hop became the dominant cultural movement of the African American and Hispanic communities in the 1980s. The Hip hop musical genre had a strong influence on pop music in the late 1980s which still continues to the present day.

During the 1980s, the hip hop genre started embracing the creation of rhythm by using the human body, via the vocal percussion technique of beatboxing. Pioneers such as Doug E. Fresh, Biz Markie and Buffy from the Fat Boys made beats, rhythm, and musical sounds using their mouth, lips, tongue, voice, and other body parts. "Human Beatbox" artists would also sing or imitate turntablism scratching or other instrument sounds.

The 1980s also saw many artists make social statements through hip hop. In 1982, Melle Mel and Duke Bootee recorded "The Message" (officially credited to Grandmaster Flash and The Furious Five), a song that foreshadowed the socially conscious statements of Run-DMC's "It's like That" and Public Enemy's "Black Steel in the Hour of Chaos".

Popular Hip hop artists of the 1980s include Run D.M.C., Beastie Boys, NWA, LL Cool J, Public Enemy, Eric B. & Rakim, Salt-n-Pepa, Big Daddy Kane, Boogie Down Productions, Whodini, De La Soul, Slick Rick, Jazzy Jeff and the Fresh Prince, and Ice-T, among others.

== Electronic music ==
In the 1980s, dance music records made using only electronic instruments became increasingly popular, largely influenced by the Electronic music of Kraftwerk and 1970s disco music. Such music was originally born of and popularized via regional nightclub scenes in the 1980s, and became the predominant type of music played in discothèques as well as the rave scene.

House music is a style of electronic dance music which originated in Chicago, Illinois, USA in the early 1980s. House music was strongly influenced by elements of soul- and funk-infused varieties of disco. Club play from pioneering DJs like Ron Hardy and Lil Louis, local dance music record shops, and the popular Hot Mix 5 shows on radio station WBMX-FM helped popularize house music in Chicago and among visiting DJs & producers from Detroit. Trax Records and DJ International Records, local labels with wider distribution, helped popularize house music outside of Chicago. It eventually reached Europe before becoming infused in mainstream pop & dance music worldwide during the 1990s.

It has been widely cited that the initial blueprint for Techno was developed during the mid-1980s in Detroit, Michigan, by Juan Atkins, Kevin Saunderson, Derrick May (the so-called "Belleville Three"), and Eddie Fowlkes, all of whom attended school together at Belleville High, near Detroit. Though initially conceived as party music that was played on daily mixed radio programs and played at parties given by cliquish, Detroit high school clubs, it has grown to be a global phenomenon.

== Country music ==
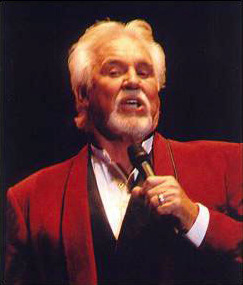
Kenny Rogers, 2004

As the 1980s dawned, pop-influenced country music was the dominant style, through such acts as Kenny Rogers, Ronnie Milsap, T.G. Sheppard, Eddie Rabbitt, Crystal Gayle, Anne Murray and Dolly Parton. The 1980 movie Urban Cowboy, a romantic comedy starring John Travolta and Debra Winger, spawned a successful soundtrack album featuring pop-styled country songs, including "Lookin' for Love" by Johnny Lee, "The Devil Went Down to Georgia" by the Charlie Daniels Band, "Could I Have This Dance" by Murray and "Love the World Away" by Rogers. The songs, and the movie itself, resulted in an early 1980s boom in pop-style country music, and the era is sometimes known as the "Urban Cowboy Movement".

By the mid-1980s, country music audiences were beginning to tire of country-pop. Although some pop-country artists continued to record and release successful songs and albums, the genre, in general, was beginning to suffer. By 1985, a New York Times article declared country music "dead". However, by this time, several newcomers were working behind the scenes to reverse this perception.

The year 1986 brought forth several new artists who performed in traditional country styles, such as honky-tonk. This sparked the "new traditionalist" movement, or return to traditional country music. The most successful of these artists included Randy Travis, Dwight Yoakam, Ricky Van Shelton, and Holly Dunn. Also, artists like Kathy Mattea and Keith Whitley, both of whom had been performing for a few years prior, had their first major hits during 1986; Mattea was more folk-styled, while Whitley was pure honky-tonk. But the new traditionalist movement had already taken hold as early as 1981 when newcomers such as John Anderson and George Strait had their first big hits, and Reba McEntire had her first big hit in 1980; in addition, songwriter–guitarist and Chet Atkins prodigy Steve Wariner also emerged as a popular act starting in the early 1980s. Another boom period for newcomers with new traditionalist styles was 1989, when artists such as Clint Black, Alan Jackson, Mary Chapin Carpenter, Lorrie Morgan and Travis Tritt had their first big hits.

Vocal duos were also popular because of their harmonies, most notably The Bellamy Brothers and The Judds. Several of the Bellamy Brothers' songs included double-entendre' laden hooks, on songs such as "Do You Love as Good As You Look". The Judds, a mother-and-daughter duo, combined elements of contemporary pop and traditional country music on songs such as "Why Not Me" and "Grandpa (Tell Me 'Bout the Good Ol' Days)".

Country music groups and bands continued to rise in popularity during the 1980s. The most successful of the lot was Alabama, a Fort Payne-based band that blended traditional and pop-country sounds with southern rock. Their concerts regularly sold out, while their single releases regularly reached No. 1 on the Billboard Hot Country Songs chart. In 1989, Alabama was named the Artist of the Decade by the Academy of Country Music. By the end of the 1980s, the group had sold more than 24 million albums in the United States.

Ranking just behind Alabama in popularity, as far as groups were concerned, were The Oak Ridge Boys and The Statler Brothers, both four-part harmony groups with gospel and country-pop stylings. The popularity of those three groups sparked a boom in new groups and bands, and by the end of the 1980s, fans were listening to such acts as Restless Heart and Exile, the latter which previously enjoyed success with the pop hit "Kiss You All Over".

Despite the prevailing pop-country sound, enduring acts from the 1970s and earlier continued to enjoy great success with fans. George Jones, one of the longest-running acts of the time, recorded several successful singles, including the critically acclaimed "He Stopped Loving Her Today". Conway Twitty continued to have a series of No. 1 hits, with 1986's "Desperado Love" becoming his 40th chart-topper on the Billboard Hot Country Singles chart, a record that stood for nearly 20 years. The movie Coal Miner's Daughter profiled the life of Loretta Lynn (with Sissy Spacek in the lead role), while Willie Nelson also had a series of acting credits. Dolly Parton had much success in the 1980s, with several leading movie roles, two No. 1 albums and 13 number one hits and having many successful tours. Others who had been around for a while and continued to have great success were Eddy Arnold, Johnny Cash, Merle Haggard, Waylon Jennings, Ray Price, Hank Williams Jr. and Tammy Wynette.

== See also ==
- 1980s in music

== Sources ==
- Rose, Tricia (1994). Black Noise: Rap Music and Black Culture in Contemporary America. Middletown, Connecticut: Wesleyan University Press. ISBN 978-0-8195-6275-3.
