= Urban Cowboy (musical) =

Musical

- Broadway poster
- Music: Jeff Blumenkrantz; Jason Robert Brown; Others
- Lyrics: Jeff Blumenkrantz; Jason Robert Brown; Others
- Book: Aaron Latham; Phillip Oesterman
- Basis: Urban Cowboy by James Bridges; Aaron Latham
- Productions: 2003 Broadway

Urban Cowboy is a musical with a book by Aaron Latham and Phillip Oesterman and a score by Broadway composer-lyricists Jeff Blumenkrantz and Jason Robert Brown and a variety of country music tunesmiths, including Clint Black and Charlie Daniels.

== Overview ==
Based on the 1980 screenplay by Latham and James Bridges, which had been adapted from a magazine article about Texas nightlife written by Latham, the plot focuses on Bud Davis, a country boy who moves to the big city for an oil refinery job and begins spending his nights at Gilley's, the local honky tonk, where he soon meets cowgirl Sissy. The trials they face and hurdles they need to overcome throughout their courtship and marriage are played out against a background of country-western music.

== Production history ==
Following a run at Miami's Coconut Grove Playhouse, the show transferred to Broadway. After 26 previews, it opened on March 27, 2003 at the Broadhurst Theatre, where it closed on May 18 after 60 performances.

The unfavorable reviews described it as "vulgar and bland" and "assembled according to a low and specific assessment of audience expectations" and "a musical whose creators weren't quite ready to get on the horse" filled with songs "used haphazardly and devoid of dramatic value".

Directed by Lonny Price, the cast of mostly newcomers included Matt Cavenaugh and Jenn Colella, both making their Broadway debuts. Also in the cast was Broadway veteran Sally Mayes who garnered a Drama Desk Award nomination for her portrayal of Aunt Corene.

The show was Tony Award-nominated for Best Choreography (Melinda Roy) and Best Original Score, with an unprecedented total of thirty composers and lyricists cited in the latter category. An original cast album was never released.

The musical had both old and original music, with country music and songs from the film as well as original songs.

== Songs ==
Act I

- Leavin' Home (Music and lyrics by Jeff Blumenkrantz)
- Long Hard Day (Music and lyrics by Bob Stillman)
- All Because of You (Music and lyrics by Jeff Blumenkrantz)
- Another Guy (Music and lyrics by Jeff Blumenkrantz)
- Boot Scootin' Boogie (Music and lyrics by Ronnie Dunn)
- It Don't Get Better Than This (Music and lyrics by Jason Robert Brown)
- Dancin' the Slow Ones With You (Music and lyrics by Danny Arena and Sara Light)
- Cowboy Take Me Away (Music and lyrics by Marcus Hummon and Martie Maguire)
- Could I Have This Dance? (Music and lyrics by Wayland D. Holyfield)
- My Back's Up Against the Wall (Music and lyrics by James B. Cobb, Jr. and Buddy Buie)
- If You Mess With the Bull (Music and lyrics by Luke Reed and Roger Brown)
- That's How She Rides (Music and lyrics by Jason Robert Brown)
- I Wish I Didn't Love You (Music and lyrics by Jason Robert Brown)

Act II

- That's How Texas Was Born (Music and lyrics by Jason Robert Brown)
- Take You for a Ride (Music and lyrics by Danny Arena, Sara Light and Lauren Lucas)
- Mr. Hopalong Heartbreak (Music and lyrics by Jason Robert Brown)
- T-R-O-U-B-L-E (Music and lyrics by Jerry Chesnut)
- Dances Turn Into Dreams (Music and lyrics by Jerry Silverstein)
- The Hard Way (Music and lyrics by Clint Black and James Hayden Nicholas)
- Git It (Music and lyrics by Tommy Conners and Roger Brown)
- Something That We Do (Music and lyrics by Clint Black and Skip Ewing)
- The Devil Went Down to Georgia (Music and lyrics by Charles Daniels, Tom Crain, Fred Edwards, Taz DiGregorio, Jim Marshall and Charlie Hayward)
- Lookin' for Love (Music and lyrics by Wanda Mallette, Patti Ryan and Bob Morrison)
