= Club Dance =

Club Dance is a television program that aired on The Nashville Network from April 1, 1991 to February 5, 1999 for a total of 1,848 episodes, with re-runs until June 28, 1999

The show was filmed in Knoxville, Tennessee set at a fictional "White Horse Cafe". The show was hosted by Shelley Mangrum, a former Miss Tennessee, and co-hosted by Phil Campbell. The cast consisted of enthusiastic unpaid local dancers and visiting professional dancers and dance groups from all over the United States, creating a unique atmosphere of mixing of styles and traditions. Within the limits of the script, the dancers were free to behave and respond to the music as if in a real dance venue.

The show included a wide variety types of country dances such as, lead and follow partner dances, choreographed dances, and line dances, as well as some others, most notably West Coast Swing, which due its slotted style allowed for dancing between tables and in other confined spaces.

The show was accompanied with the monthly newsletter Club Dance: Behind the Scenes. It was produced by Knoxville-based CineTel Productions.
