= United Country Western Dance Council =

- United Country Western Dance Council
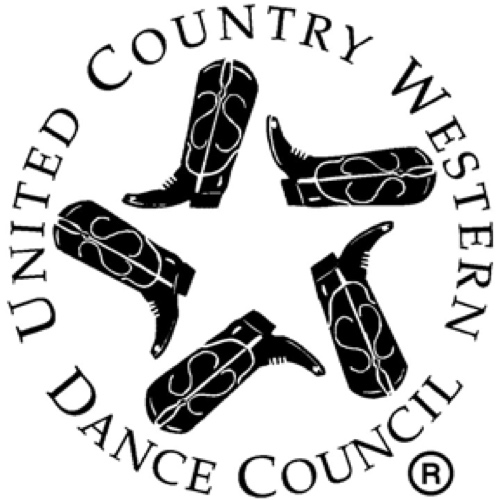
- UCWDC Logo
- Nickname: "The U-C"
- Formation: 1989
- Founded at: Grantville, Pennsylvania, United States
- President: Kathy St. Jean
- Vice President of Judge Certification: Clive Eaton-Stevens
- Vice President of Rules and Scoring Procedures: Beth Emerson
- Treasurer: Shari Huggett-Milton
- Key people: Noelle Linch – Secretary, Keith Armbruster – 1st Past President, Kathi Bittner – 2nd Past President
- Website: https://ucwdc.org

The United Country Western Dance Council (UCWDC) is an organization that advocates for and organizes competitive country/western dancesport events. UCWDC regionally-sanctioned events are hosted in more than two dozen U.S. cities and also in the nations of Canada, the Netherlands, Italy, Germany, South Korea, Belgium, Malaysia, Ireland, Japan, China, South Africa, and Lithuania.

The UCWDC is based on a framework of event directors, who are owners of regional dance-competition events in cities around the world. The event directors are overseen by a board of directors. The board of directors governs the overall organization and maintains a standard of operations, uniform competition format, judging, scoring and comprehensive rules, adhered to by dancesport competitors.

These dancesport participants compete at authorized regional dance competitions during the dance season, beginning in January and ending in December of any given year. After attending a required minimum number of dance events, dancers are able to establish eligibility for attending the UCWDC Country Dance World Championships at the end of the year.

== History ==
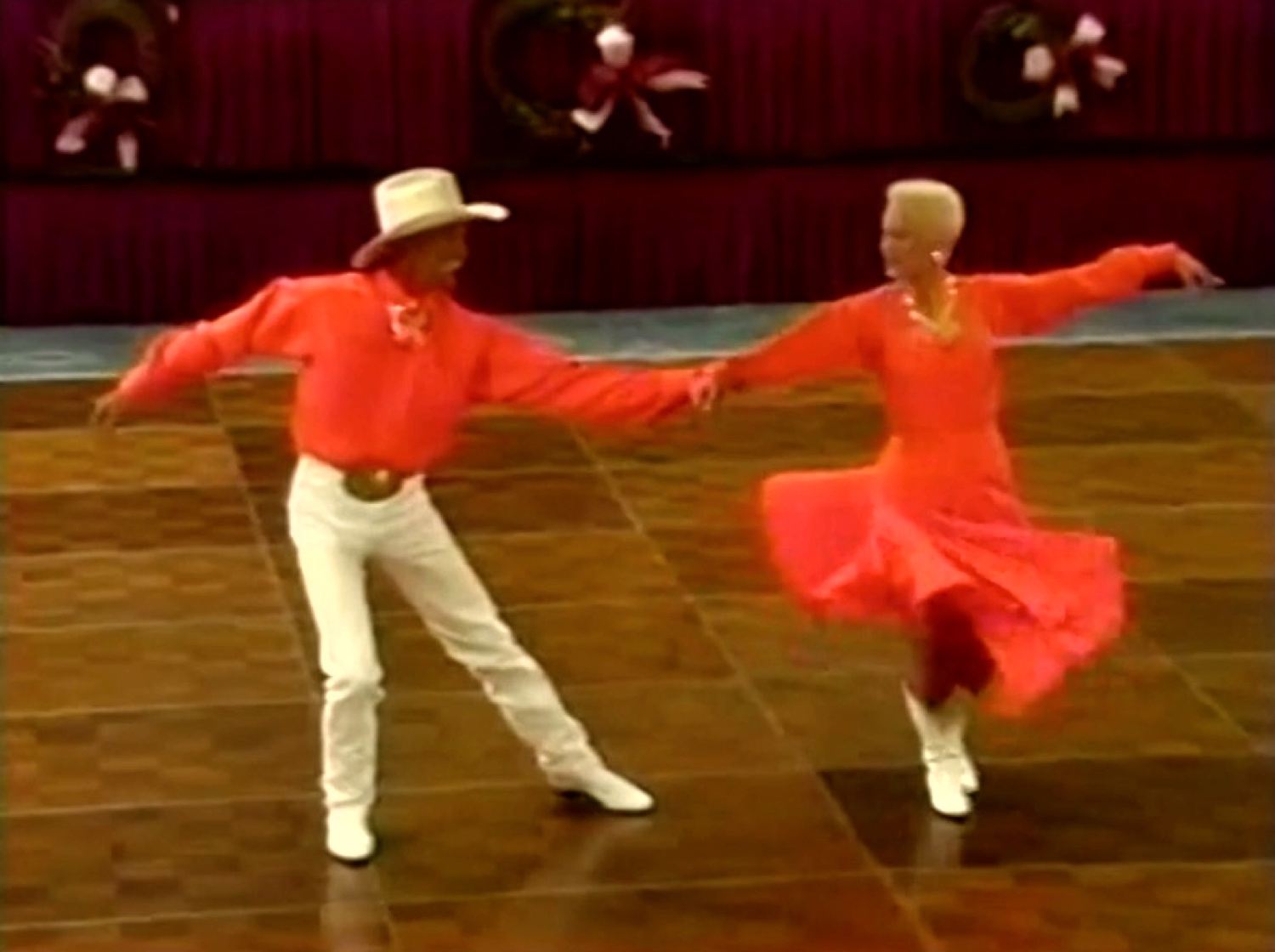
Carroll Shaw & Marta Elder, UCWDC 1994 New Mexico Dance Fiesta, Cha Cha, Showcase Division One, Albuquerque, New Mexico

The UCWDC was established in 1989 and was incorporated in 1990 as a non-profit organization in Camp Hill, Pennsylvania.

In 1980, the film Urban Cowboy, featuring John Travolta, was released. The movie influenced popular culture with not only the success of three #1 hits on the country music charts, but the portrayal of a country/western nightclub, country/western attire and a dance competition at the Dallas, Texas honkytonk, Gilley’s. Country/western dance became popular in the United States and gave rise to nightclubs such as the Grizzly Rose in Denver, Colorado, the Lone Star Cafe in New York City, New York and the Wrangler’s Roost in San Diego, California.

A new dance craze began in the United States and with it, the rise of country/western dance competitions. In 1989, a group of 21 country/western dance-event owners met in Grantville, Pennsylvania with the goal of creating a national organization with uniform rules, teaching canon, judging, dance standards and competition formats. Prior to the creation of the UCWDC, country/western dance events had differing formats and rules. The UCWDC created a uniform structure.

== Gallery of regional UCWDC championship belt buckles ==
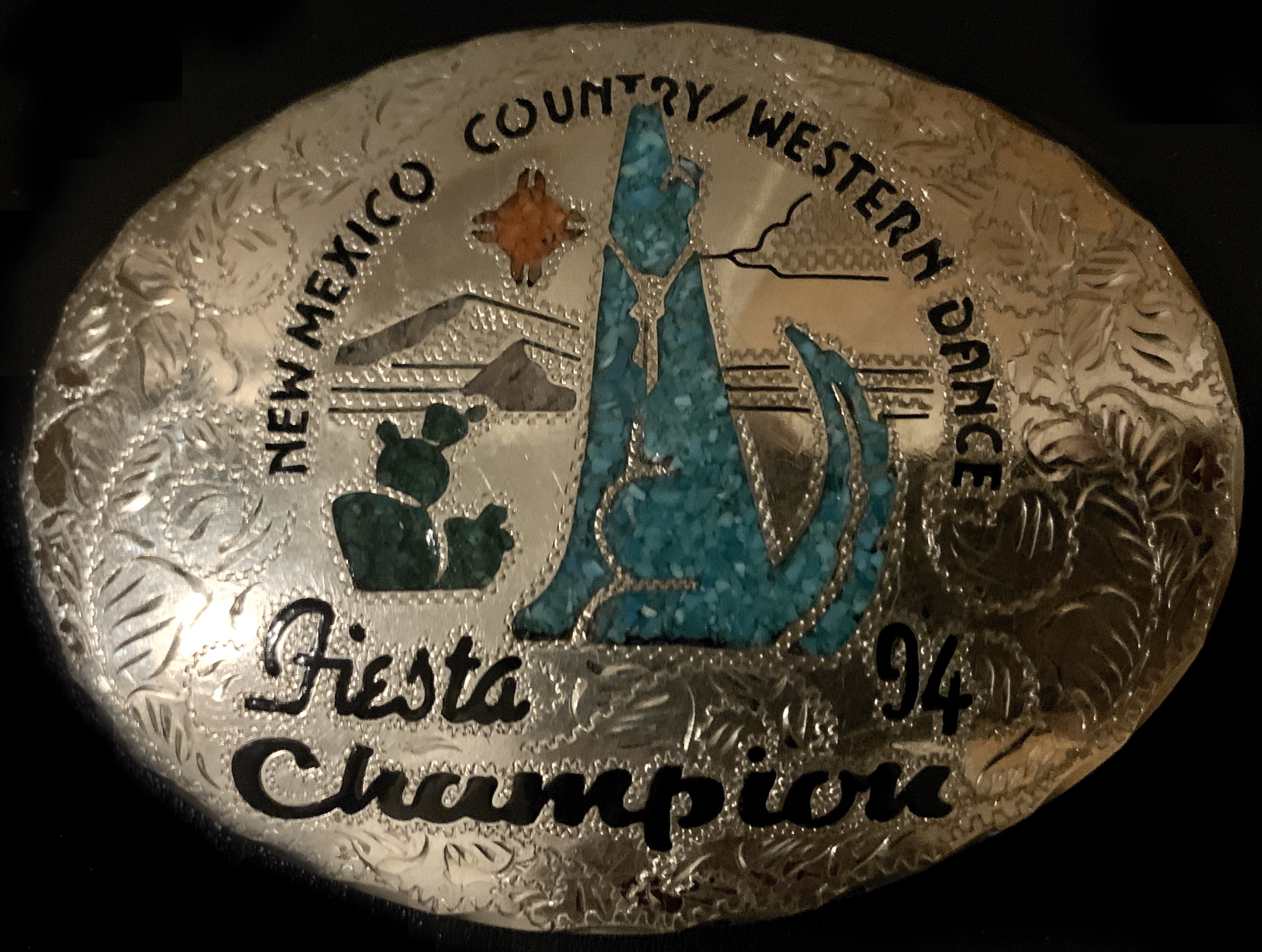
1994 New Mexico Dance Fiesta Division IV (Albuquerque, New Mexico)

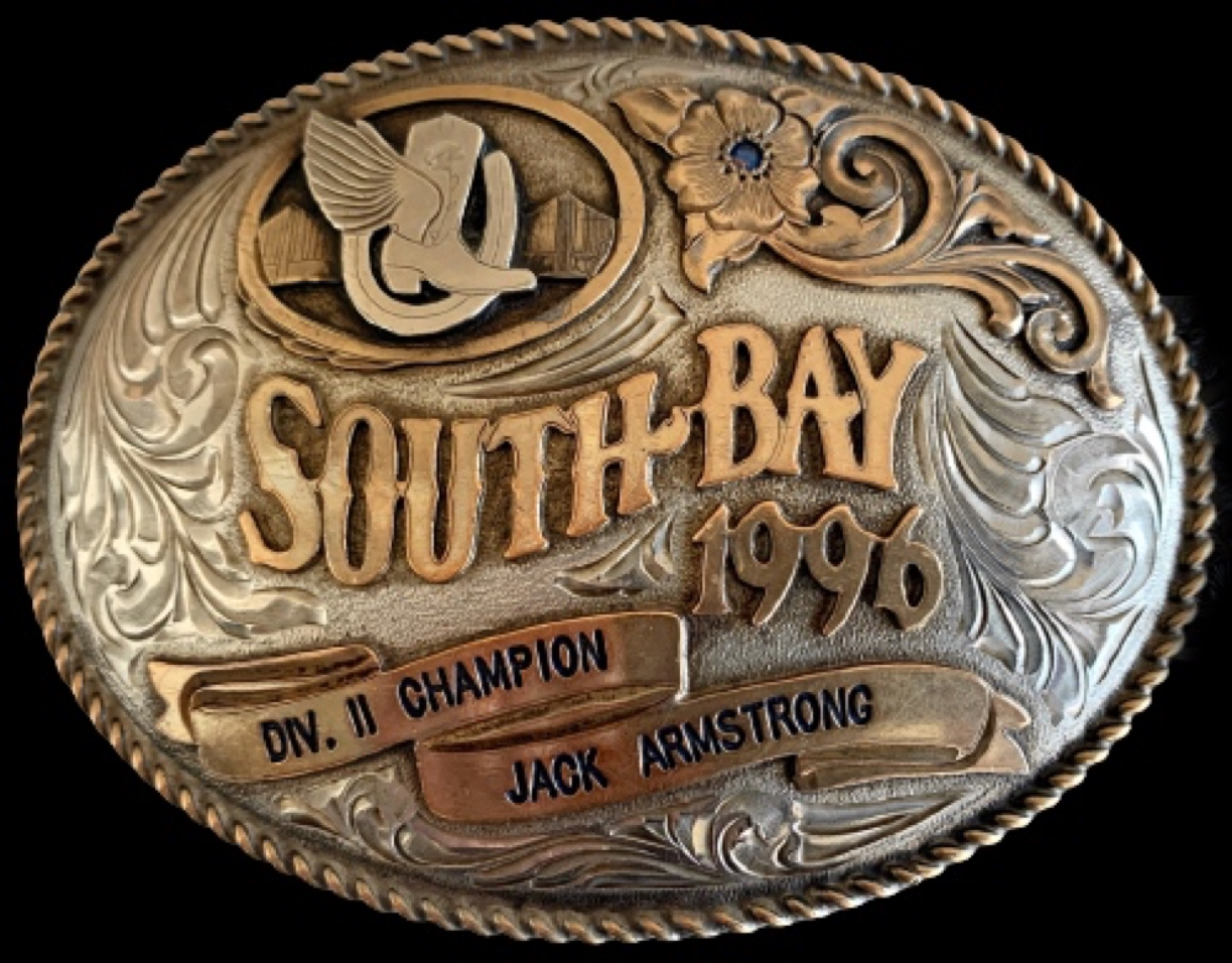
1996 South Bay Classic Division II (San Jose, California)

== UCWDC Country Dance World Championships ==
The UCWDC Country Dance World Championships, popularly referred to as "Worlds", is an annual competition which awards country/western world dancesport championship titles to individuals, couples, and dance teams from around the globe. Worlds has been held every year, since its inception in 1993, with the exception of the 2021 event which was canceled due to the COVID-19 pandemic.

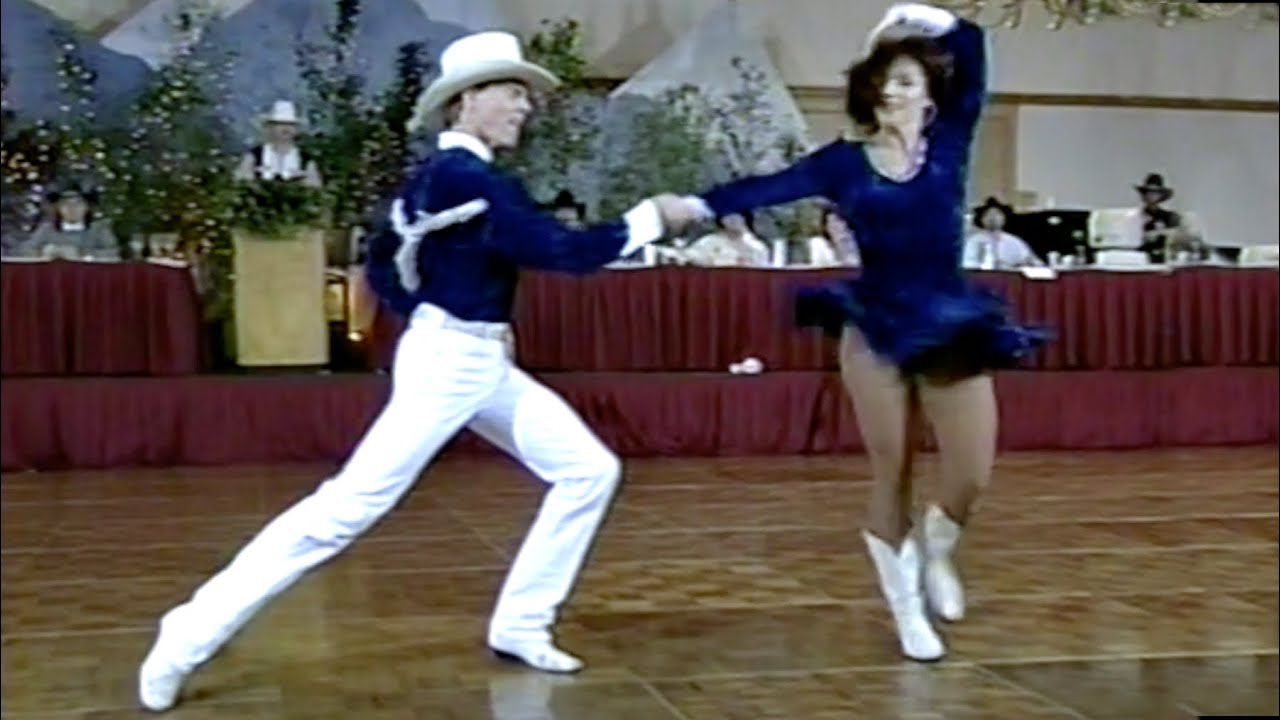
Bob Bahrs & Debbie Bernard, 1996 UCWDC Colorado Country Classic, Showcase Division One, Cha Cha

The world championships are the culmination of a competition season and have been located primarily inside the United States, however they were held once in Canada, once in the Netherlands, and once in Sweden. "Worlds" is the largest event on the UCWDC calendar. Worlds 2020 had over 6,500 entries, while Worlds 2023 has over 7,000 entries.

== Adjudication ==
The UCWDC maintains a program for judge training and certification in order to establish uniformity and credibility. Potential candidates for this training must pay fees for training, adhere to a code of conduct, and maintain currency as a UCWDC adjudicator. The Vice President of Rules oversees UCWDC-certified judges, maintains a list (or "pool") of qualified judges and establishes standards for judging methodology.

== Dance divisions ==
Competitors at UCWDC events are required to have a current UCWDC associate membership. Dancesport contestants may register in couples, line dance, teams, ProAm, ProPro, cabaret or showtime competition divisions. These divisions are divided by skill level and by age. Dancesport competition occurs via a system of “heats”. As a heat begins, contestants enter the floor from a staging area, take positions, a deejay plays music and the contestants perform. UCWDC couples, ProAm, and ProPro may compete in as many as eight country/western dances which are danced in the following prescribed order; triple two-step, nightclub, waltz, polka, cha cha, east coast swing, two-step, and west coast swing.

=== Couples ===
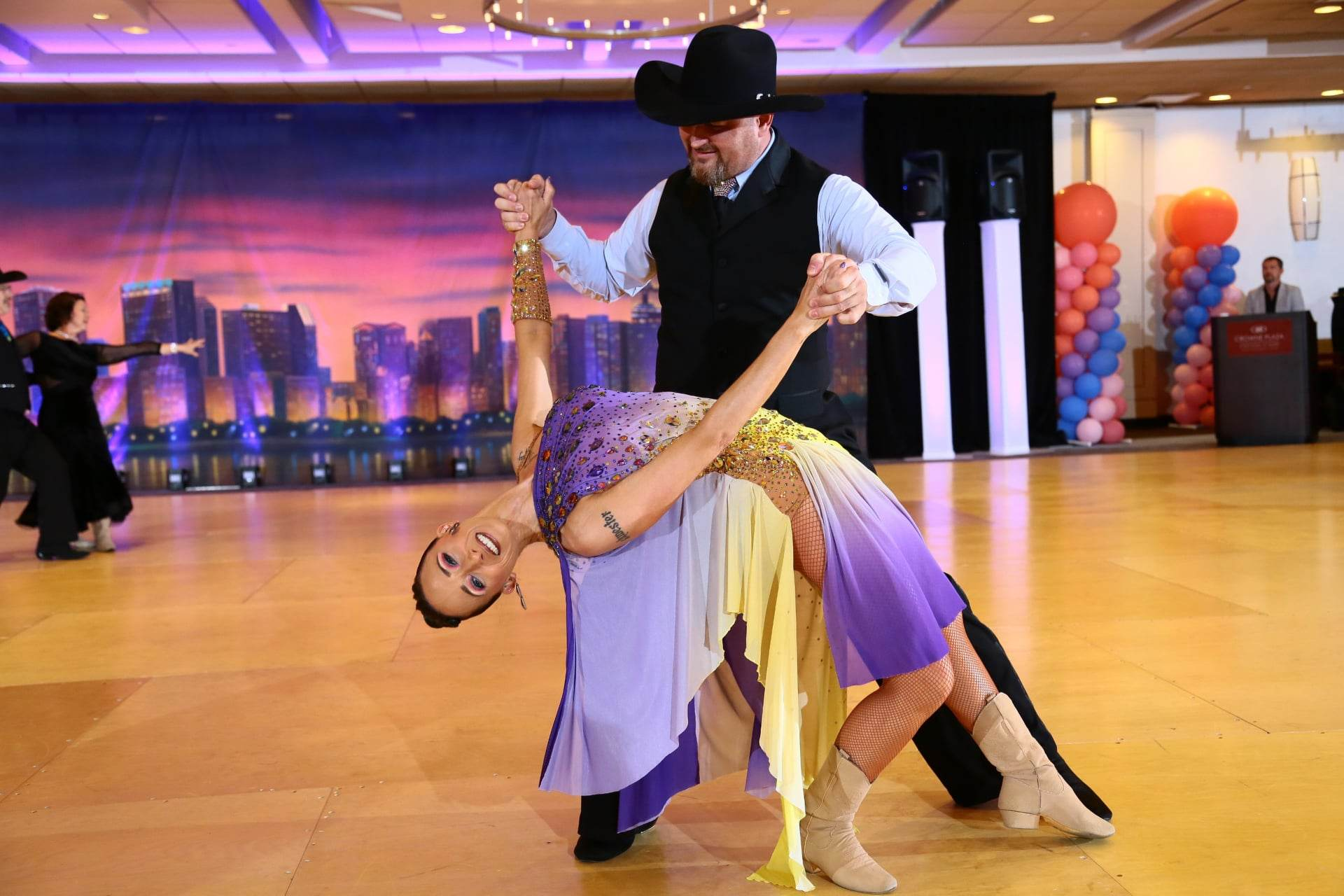
Jason Thornton & Courtney Toben, Classic Division One, UCWDC dancesport competitors, 2022

In couples competition, one partner, generally a male, is the "lead" and the other, generally a female, the "follow". Leads wear a number pinned to their back. The number allows the judges to assign judging scores to the appropriate competitive couple. In UCWDC couples competition, dancers compete at a dance level commensurate with their skill abilities and/or qualifications.

Dancers may choose to compete in Classic style or Showcase style. In Classic, the competitors do not know which song the deejay will choose for them. In Showcase, couples choreograph routines to specific songs.

Dance levels:

- Syllabus is a beginner or entry-level division with strict movement and dress-code constraints.
- Division IV is a beginner or entry-level division which allows for an expanded range of dance patterns.
- Division III is a more advanced level of competition than Division IV.
- Division II is a division populated by couples with strong dance skills and competition experience.
- Division I is a division which contains dancers who have exceptional skills and experience.
- Masters Division is the highest level of competition for dancers aged 18 and above. Qualifications are mandatory.
- Crown Division is the highest level of competition for dancers aged 40 and above. Qualifications are mandatory.
- Crown Plus Division is the same as Crown, only for dancers aged 55 and above. Qualifications are mandatory.

Couples divisions are also organized by age

Age Division	Age Restrictions
Junior Primary	less than 10
Junior Youth	10-13
Junior Teen	14-17
Open	18+
Crystal	30+
Diamond	40+
Silver	50+
Gold	60+
Platinum	70+

=== ProAm and ProPro ===
ProAm couples are a dance partnership formed between a professional dancer and a student. In general, the student pays the professional to dance with them in competition. ProPro couples are made up of two professional dancers, one of which is generally the senior instructor and the other, a professional who is the "student". The students wear a number pinned to their back. In UCWDC ProAm or ProPro competition, student dancers compete at a dance level commensurate with their skill abilities and/or qualifications.

Dance levels:

- Syllabus is a beginner or entry-level division with strict movement and dress-code constraints.
- Newcomer is a beginner or entry-level division which allows for an expanded range of dance patterns.
- Novice is a more advanced level of competition than Newcomer.
- Intermediate is a division populated by couples with strong dance skills and competition experience.
- Advanced is a division which contains dancers who have exceptional skills and experience.

ProAm or ProPro divisions are also organized by age

Age Division	Age Restrictions
Junior Primary	less than 10
Junior Youth	10-13
Junior Teen	14-17
Open	18+
Crystal	30+
Diamond	40+
Silver	50+
Gold	60+
Platinum	70+
Pearl	80+

== UCWDC regional events ==
UCWDC regional events in the United States
- Peach State Country Western Dance Festival - "Peach State" is an annual UCWDC dancesport competition and country/western dance festival held every March in Atlanta, Georgia. The event was inaugurated in 1990 and is one of the oldest UCWDC events. Peach State has a large number of competitions, workshops and social dancing.
- Tulip Challenge - The Tulip Challenge is an annual UCWDC dancesport competition and country/western dance festival held every March in De Rijp, Netherlands. The Tulip Challenge draws a large number of international contestants, as in its 2018 edition, the countries represented were Germany, Belgium, South Korea, Spain, France, Holland, Ireland, Italy, Lithuania, Sweden, Switzerland, the United Kingdom, and the United States.
- Calgary Dance Stampede - The Calgary Dance Stampede is an annual dancesport competition and country/western dance festival held every April in Calgary, Alberta, Canada. It is one of the first events on the UCWDC calendar. This is Canada's largest and longest running country, swing and line dance event and a points-registry event for the Country Two Step Tour (CTST). Keith Armbruster, UCWDC President, is this event's director of operations. In 2022, the Calgary Dance Stampede included performances from local Ukrainian dance teams.
- San Diego Dance Festival - The San Diego Dance Festival is an annual UCWDC dancesport competition and country/western dance festival held every April in San Diego, California. This event is one of two UCWDC events located in San Diego.
- Oklahoma Dance Rush - The Oklahoma Dance Rush is an annual UCWDC dancesport competition and country/western dance festival held every April in Oklahoma City, Oklahoma.
- Italian Country/Western Dance Classic - The Italian Country/Western Dance Classic is an annual UCWDC dancesport competition and country/western dance festival held every April in Rome, Italy.
- MidAtlantic Dance Classic - Dulles, Virginia
- German Dance Cup - The German Dance Cup is an annual UCWDC dancesport competition and country/western dance festival held every May in Düsseldorf, Germany. In 2002, the Deutschen Tanzsportverbandes (German Dancesport) officially recognized country western dancing a dancesport. The Deutschen Tanzsportverbandes and the UCWDC coordinate efforts on making country western dance more popular in Germany.
- Texas Classic - Austin, Texas
- Orange Blossom Dance Festival - Orlando, Florida
- Seoul International Line Dance Festival - Seoul, South Korea
- Colorado Country Classic - Denver
- Indy Dance Explosion - Indianapolis, Indiana
- Big Apple Country Dance Festival - Morristown, New Jersey
- New Orleans Dance Mardi Gras - New Orleans, Louisiana
- European Open Championships
- New England Dance Festival - Boston, Massachusetts
- Arizona Dance Classic - Phoenix, Arizona
- Chicagoland Country & Swing Dance Festival - Rosemont, Illinois
- Asia Pacific Line Dance Classic - Kuala Lumpur
- Nashville Dance Classic - Nashville, Tennessee
- South Bay Dance Fling - San Jose, California
- Benelux Open - The Benelux Open is an annual UCWDC dancesport competition and country/western dance festival held every September in Venray, Netherlands.
- New Mexico Dance Fiesta - The New Mexico Dance Fiesta is an annual UCWDC dancesport competition and country/western dance festival held every September in Albuquerque, New Mexico. Mike Haley, Patti Miller and Steve Stevens created this event in 1989. The New Mexico Dance Fiesta is the oldest dance competition in New Mexico.
- Global Dance Festival - Incheon
- Japan Country Dance Challenge - Tokyo
- Shamrock Western Dance Classic - Dublin
- Southern National Dance Competition - Panama City Beach, Florida
- Paradise Country Dance Festival - San Diego, California
- Philly Fall Fest - Philadelphia, Pennsylvania
- Dallas Dance Festival - Dallas, Texas
- China Cup International Line Dance Open Competition - Hangzhou, China
- South African Classic - Sun City, South Africa
- Lithuanian Open - Trakai, Lithuania
- Las Vegas Dance Finale - Las Vegas, Nevada
- Christmas in Dixie - Birmingham, Alabama

Defunct UCWDC events
Event name	Location
Utah Country Western Dance Challenge	Salt Lake City, Utah
Atlantic Seashore Dance Faire	Williamsburg, Virginia
Star of the Northland Dance Festival	Minneapolis, Minnesota
River City Country Western Dance Festival	Edmonton, Alberta
Gateway Country Classic	St. Louis, Missouri
Missouri Country Dance Rodeo	Joplin, Missouri
Firecracker Country Dance Festival	Dayton, Ohio
Sunshine State Country Western Dance Festival	Ft. Lauderdale, Florida
Derby City Championships	Louisville, Kentucky
Portland Dance Festival	Portland, Oregon
London Dance Classic	London, United Kingdom
Eastern Invitational Dance Challenge	Washington, DC
