= Anchor Step =

West Coast Swing dance move

The anchor step, or anchor, is a dance step at the end of a pattern in West Coast Swing dance that is used while maintaining a connection.

Although the beginners are taught it in a specific way, when danced by advanced dancers, the anchor is not a specific rhythm or foot position. Both partners place their center of gravity behind the heel of the forward foot on the last two beats (last of each basic step pattern. Partners feel an away force between them, and each is responsible for establishing their own anchor.

The anchor step is the terminating step pattern of nearly all main West Coast Swing dance moves. Together with the slot, it is the most distinguishing element of West Coast Swing when compared to other swing dances.

In its standard form, the anchor step consists of three steps with the syncopated rhythm pattern “1-and-2” (counted, e.g., as “5-and-6” in 6-beat dance moves) and the general directions of steps “back, replace, back (and slightly sideways)” danced almost in place. The leader dances R-L-R feet, the follower dances L-R-L.

At the end of the anchor step, the partners settle their weights on the back foot, the handhold is typically L-to-R, with leverage connection maintained throughout the step, and there is no urge to go in any direction in the end: the partners are “anchored” in this terminal position at their respective ends of the slot (hence the name of the step), ready to commence the next move according to the leader's lead.

== See also ==
- Coaster Step
