= Patti Ryan =

American singer-songwriter

- Also known as: Patty Ryan
- Born: Patti A. Ryan; Long Beach, Mississippi, U.S.
- Genres: Country, Americana
- Occupation: Singer-songwriter
- Years active: late 1970s–early 1990s

Patti Ryan (also known as Patti A. Ryan and Patty Ryan) is an American singer-songwriter best known as a co-writer of the country hit "Lookin' for Love", recorded by Johnny Lee for the 1980 film Urban Cowboy.

== Early life ==
Ryan grew up on the Mississippi Gulf Coast and was residing in Long Beach, Mississippi, during the early stages of her songwriting career. Prior to achieving success in the music industry, she worked as an elementary-school teacher in the Gulfport School District.

== Career ==
Ryan came to prominence as a songwriter through "Lookin' for Love", which she co-wrote with Wanda Mallette and Bob Morrison. According to contemporary accounts, Ryan and fellow Gulf Coast schoolteacher Wanda Mallette developed the song before it was completed with songwriter Bob Morrison in Nashville. The song was reportedly rejected by more than twenty artists before being selected by Johnny Lee for inclusion in the soundtrack of the 1980 film Urban Cowboy. Released in June 1980, "Lookin' for Love" reached No. 1 on the Billboard Hot Country Singles chart and No. 4 on the Billboard Top 100 Singles, becoming Johnny Lee's signature hit and one of the most successful country-pop crossover recordings of the year.

Ryan subsequently wrote songs recorded by artists including Anne Murray, Moe Bandy and Lorrie Morgan. She later worked in the Nashville songwriting community and has also been associated with the Americana group Inukshuk Pass.

== Urban Cowboy: The Musical ==
Ryan was among the composers and lyricists whose songs were incorporated into Urban Cowboy, the Broadway musical adaptation of the film. The production received a nomination for the Tony Award for Best Original Score (Music and/or Lyrics) Written for the Theatre at the 57th Tony Awards in 2003.

== Awards and nominations ==
The success of Urban Cowboy and "Lookin' for Love" resulted in several industry award nominations. Ryan was among the credited songwriters nominated for the Grammy Award for Best Album of Original Score Written for a Motion Picture or Television Special for Urban Cowboy at the 23rd Annual Grammy Awards. She also shared Academy of Country Music Award nominations for Song of the Year and Single Record of the Year for "Lookin' for Love".

Year	Award	Category	Work	Result
1981	Grammy Awards	Best Country Song	"Lookin' for Love"	Nominated
1981	Grammy Awards	Best Score Soundtrack for Visual Media	Urban Cowboy	Nominated
1981	Academy of Country Music Awards	Song of the Year	"Lookin' for Love"	Nominated
1981	Academy of Country Music Awards	Single Record of the Year	"Lookin' for Love"	Nominated
1981	Academy of Country Music Awards	Album of the Year	Urban Cowboy	Won
2003	Tony Awards	Best Original Score Written for the Theatre (Music and Lyrics)	Urban Cowboy	Nominated

== Selected songwriting credits ==
- 1981: "Lookin' for Love" (Johnny Lee)
- 1981: "Goodnight, Cowboy, Goodnight" (Tammy Wynette)
- 1984: "Just Another Woman in Love" (Anne Murray)
- 1988: "Americana" (Moe Bandy)
- 1989: "Out of Your Shoes" (Lorrie Morgan)
