= Western dance =

Western dance may refer to:

- Western dance (Europe and North America), dance styles from the Western world
- Country–western dance, dance styles associated with the American West
