= Urban Cowboy (soundtrack) =

Soundtrack for 1980 movie Urban Cowboy

Urban Cowboy: Original Motion Picture Soundtrack

Soundtrack album by Various artists
- Released: June 6, 1980
- Genres: Country; rock
- Length: 66:12
- Labels: Full Moon, Asylum
- Producer: Irving Azoff (exec.)

Singles from Urban Cowboy
- 1. "All Night Long" Released: May 1980; 2. "Stand By Me" Released: May 1980; 3. "Love the World Away" Released: June 1980; 4. "Lookin' for Love" Released: July 1980; 5. "Look What You've Done to Me" Released: August 1980; 6. "Could I Have This Dance" Released: August 1980

Urban Cowboy: Original Motion Picture Soundtrack is the soundtrack to the 1980 film Urban Cowboy. It spawned numerous Top 10 Billboard Country Singles, such as #1 "Lookin' for Love" by Johnny Lee, #1 "Stand by Me" by Mickey Gilley, #3 (AC chart) "Look What You've Done to Me" by Boz Scaggs, #1 "Could I Have This Dance" by Anne Murray, and #4 "Love the World Away" by Kenny Rogers. It also included songs that were hits from earlier years such as #1 "The Devil Went Down to Georgia" by the Charlie Daniels Band and "Lyin' Eyes" by the Eagles. In December 2018 the soundtrack was certified triple platinum by the RIAA for sales of three million copies.

Initially released as a double LP in 1980, the album was re-released on CD in 1995.

== Track listing ==
Side A
| No. | Title | Performer(s) | Length |
|---|---|---|---|
| 1. | "Hello Texas" | Jimmy Buffett | 2:33 |
| 2. | "All Night Long" | Joe Walsh | 3:50 |
| 3. | "Times Like These" | Dan Fogelberg | 3:02 |
| 4. | "Nine Tonight" | Bob Seger & The Silver Bullet Band | 6:35 |
| Total length: | | | 16:00 |

Side B
| No. | Title | Performer(s) | Length |
|---|---|---|---|
| 5. | "Stand By Me" | Mickey Gilley | 3:35 |
| 6. | "Cherokee Fiddle" | Johnny Lee | 4:06 |
| 7. | "Could I Have This Dance" | Anne Murray | 3:14 |
| 8. | "Lyin' Eyes" | Eagles | 6:23 |
| Total length: | | | 17:18 |

Side C
| No. | Title | Performer(s) | Length |
|---|---|---|---|
| 9. | "Lookin' for Love" | Johnny Lee | 3:41 |
| 10. | "Don't It Make Ya Wanna Dance" | Bonnie Raitt | 3:29 |
| 11. | "The Devil Went Down to Georgia" | Charlie Daniels Band | 3:35 |
| 12. | "Here Comes the Hurt Again" | Mickey Gilley | 2:41 |
| 13. | "Orange Blossom Special" / "Hoedown" | Gilley's "Urban Cowboy" Band | 2:06 |
| Total length: | | | 15:32 |

Side D
| No. | Title | Performer(s) | Length |
|---|---|---|---|
| 14. | "Love the World Away" | Kenny Rogers | 3:11 |
| 15. | "Falling in Love for the Night" | Charlie Daniels Band | 3:00 |
| 16. | "Darlin'" | Bonnie Raitt | 2:34 |
| 17. | "Look What You've Done to Me" | Boz Scaggs | 5:39 |
| 18. | "Hearts Against the Wind" | Linda Ronstadt and JD Souther | 2:58 |
| Total length: | | | 17:22 |

== Chart performance ==
| Chart (1980) | Peak position |
|---|---|
| Australia (Kent Music Report) | 26 |
| Canada Top Albums/CDs (RPM) | 21 |
| Canada Country Albums/CDs (RPM) | 2 |
| US Billboard 200 | 3 |
| US Top Country Albums (Billboard) | 1 |

== Chart singles ==
| Year | US BB | US CB | US AC | US Country | CAN | CAN AC | CAN Country | NZ | Title | Artist |
|---|---|---|---|---|---|---|---|---|---|---|
| May 1980 | 19 | 18 | -- | -- | 27 | -- | -- | -- | "All Night Long" | Joe Walsh |
| May 1980 | 22 | 22 | 3 | 1 | 51 | -- | 3 | -- | "Stand By Me" | Mickey Gilley |
| June 1980 | 14 | 17 | 8 | 4 | 25 | -- | 1 | -- | "Love the World Away" | Kenny Rogers |
| July 1980 | 5 | 4 | 10 | 1 | 54 | 20 | 18 | -- | "Lookin' for Love" | Johnny Lee |
| August 1980 | 14 | 13 | 3 | -- | 30 | 41 | -- | 39 | "Look What You've Done to Me" | Boz Scaggs |
| August 1980 | 33 | 53 | 3 | 1 | 19 | 1 | 1 | 2 | "Could I Have This Dance" | Anne Murray |
