= Americana (song) =

Single by Moe Bandy

from the album No Regrets
- B-side: "What Goes Around"
- Released: January 1988
- Genre: Country
- Length: 4:23
- Label: Curb
- Songwriters: Larry Alderman; Richard Fagan; Patti Ryan
- Producer: Jerry Kennedy

Moe Bandy singles chronology
"You Haven't Heard the Last of Me" (1987)	"Americana" (1988)	"Ashes in the Wind" (1988)

"Americana" is a song recorded by American country music artist Moe Bandy. It was released in January 1988 as the first single from his album No Regrets. The song peaked at number 8 on the Billboard Hot Country Singles chart, and to date is his last top 10 single.

== Content ==
The song is a salute to small-town America and a celebration of its values and camaraderie. Various observations – elderly men playing checkers, children playing hopscotch and teenagers going on a date at a local soda fountain – are observed first-person style from a traveling performer, whose vehicle had pulled off of a four-lane highway for a short break. The song was written by Larry Alderman, Richard Fagan and Patti Ryan noted Nashville songwriters.

== Charts ==
=== Weekly charts ===
Chart (1988)	Peak position
US Hot Country Songs (Billboard)	8

=== Year-end charts ===
Chart (1988)	Position
US Hot Country Songs (Billboard)	94
