= Country–western dance =

Dance genre originating in parts of the United States

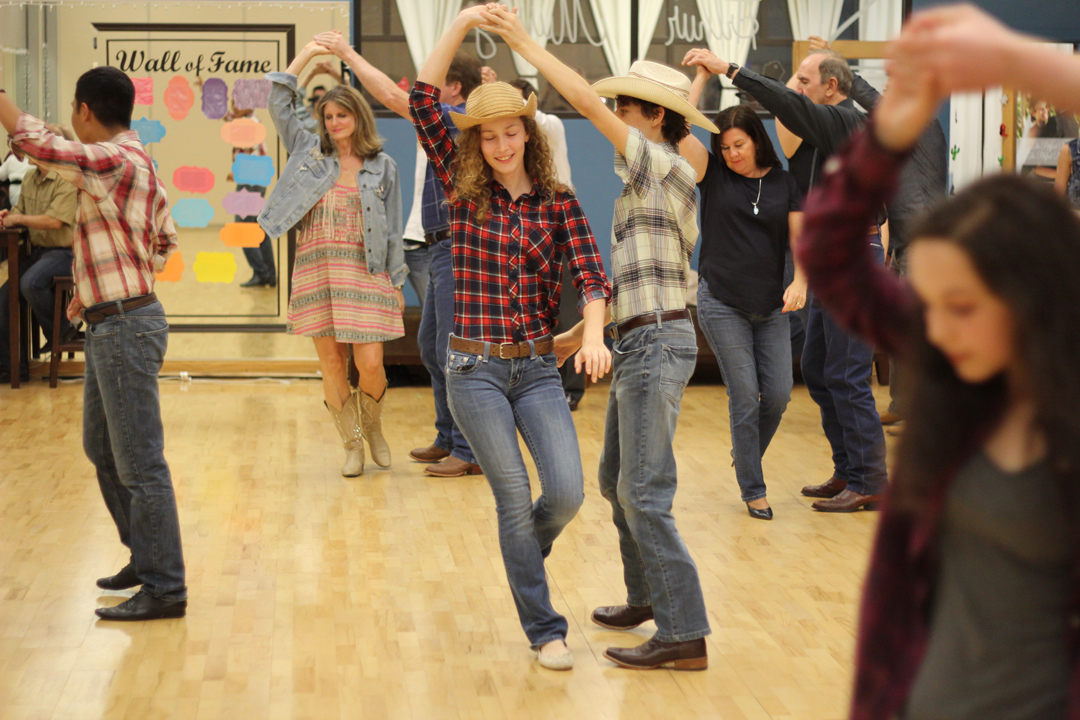
Country-western dancing in Texas, 2016

Country–western dance encompasses any of the dance forms or styles which are typically danced to country-western music, and which are stylistically associated with American country and/or western traditions. Many are descended from dances brought to the United States by immigrants from the United Kingdom and Europe as early as the 1700s, which became integrated into American popular culture. Country dancing is also known as "kicker dancing" in Texas.

== Dances ==
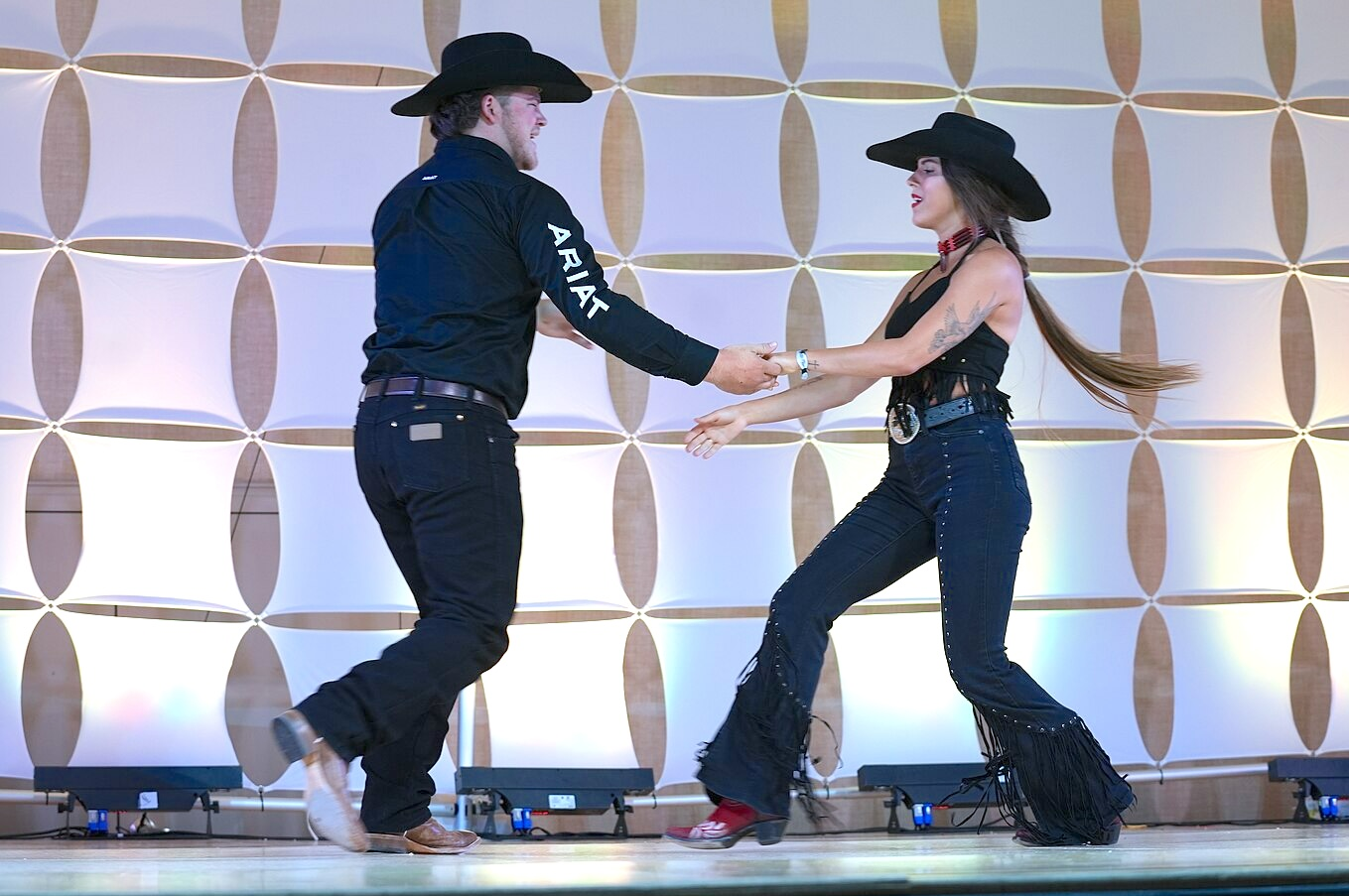
Western couple dancing in California, 2025

Western couple dancing is a form of social dance. Many different dances are done to country-western music. These dances include: Two Step, Waltz, Cowboy or Traveling Cha Cha, Polka Ten Step (also known as Ten Step Polka), Schottische, and other Western promenade dances, East Coast Swing, West Coast Swing, and Nightclub Two Step. The Two Step and various Western promenade or pattern couples dances are unique to country western dancing.

Western group dances include the following:

- Line dance
- Square dance
  - Traditional square dance
  - Modern western square dance

Country dancing is informal. Because of cowboy boots, country western dance is more likely to feature a flat-footed glide with some heel and toe touches rather than a lot of "toe type" dancing.

There are many versions of each dance, and many have no one "correct" set of steps. Individual dances may have different names in different areas of the United States. Some dances even have specific names local to particular dance venues. Cowboy, or "country" waltz consists of gliding steps that are consistent with wearing cowboy boots, rather than "on the balls of the feet" quick steps of the classic version. Neither foot is lifted completely from the ground. Steps should be a light footed glide rather than a flat footed shuffle.

== Lead and follow ==
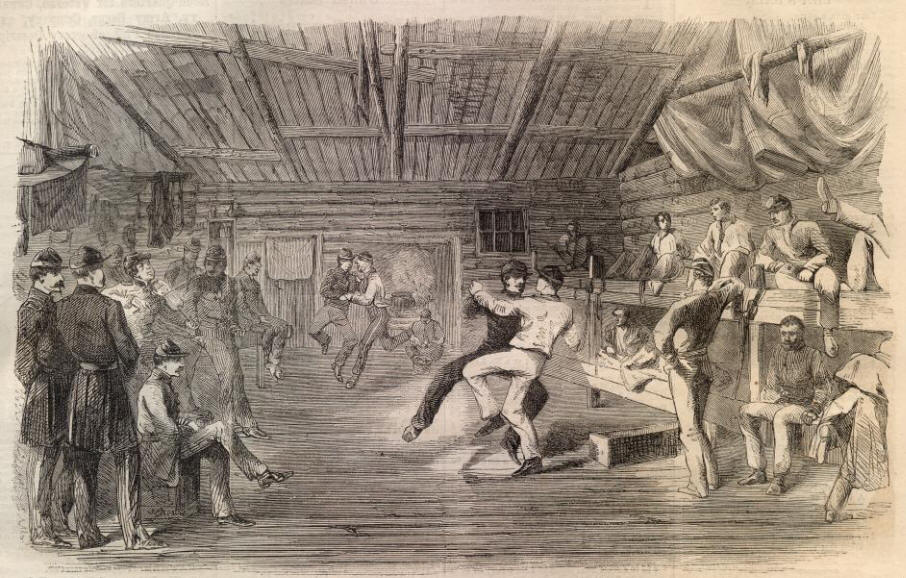
Civil War Harper's Weekly, February 6, 1864. "THE STAG DANCE. OUR soldiers believe in the literal interpretation of the dictum of the Wise Man that "there is a time to dance." But to put their faith into works is not the easiest thing in the world, owing to the lack of partners of the feminine persuasion. However, by imagining a bearded and pantalooned fellow to be of "t'other kind," they succeed in getting up what they call a "Stag Dance," which is better than none, as is shown by the intense interest evinced by the spectators."

In traditional country–western dance, the man leads the dance by establishing the pace and length of stride, as well as deciding when to change the step. He leads his partner, usually a woman, by assertively yet gently directing her movements. The partner is expected to synchronize with the man, performing her part of the dance at his pace. In cases where the woman knew the routine and the man did not, it was acceptable for her to subtly direct the man, although she would still be the following partner.

In frontier days men danced with each other when women were not available. According to an early settler in Texas, "The gentle sex were few in number at the dance... Two men had to dance together to make a set." Another account states that "due to the scarcity of young women, a number of young bachelors who were either smooth shaven or wore polished shoes were designated as ladies." There were also "stag" dances with no women. "Heifer branded" men, those dancing the woman's role, wore handkerchiefs tied around one arm. A photograph from one early "stag" dance shows a "closed" dance position, with the "man's" right arm around the back of the "woman". At other times men dancing the role of the woman wore aprons.

== History ==
=== Early history ===
Country–western dance originated in the dances and music brought to the United States by the people of the British Isles and continental Europe. In particular, there was a fad for French culture in the United States during the French Revolution of 1789–1799, and many French dances were absorbed into American popular culture. The American version of the Virginia Reel, for example, is based on the French dance called "Sir Roger de Coverly". French dancing teachers also brought quadrilles, dances which featured four couples dancing in a square. The cotillion appears to have originated from a quadrillion. These dances were particularly influential in the development of the square dance.

These dances soon developed into less formal dances, particularly the jig. One 1774 account states that "Betwixt the country dances they have what I call everlasting Jigs. A couple gets up and begins to cut a jig (to some Negro tune). Others come and cut them out, and these dances always last as long as the fidler can play." Another author wrote of whites doing "giggs". Southern wrote that "the whites themselves, and especially the younger ones, were apt to move into reels and jigs at their own dances after a few perfunctory bows in the direction of "society sets" such as minuets and cotillions.

Popular reels, danced with a partner, included Lady Walpole's Reel, aka Boston Fancy, Lady Washington's Reel and Speed the Plow. In the 1880s the "Devil's Dream", which bore a decided resemblance to the "Old Zip Coon", was a popular dance. In the late 19th century a type of country dance known as "swinging" appeared, which involved couples twirling around the dance floor together at high speed, much to the disapproval of many "etiquette experts".

In the early 19th century, large farmhouses were sometimes built with rooms intended for dancing. In smaller houses, the kitchen was used for this purpose. Town halls were also used for gatherings. House dances were called "junkets" or "heel-burners," and they were casual affairs. These dances would last from mid-afternoon through the next morning. In the early 19th century, Richmond, Virginia closed out yearly horse racing with a ball featuring reels, contradances, congos, hornpipes, and jigs.

Early solo dancing was composed mostly of extemporaneous jigging done by men. The term "jig" has been used to describe various forms of solo dance steps, as well as music, and has not been well defined. Jigs, clogs, shuffles, leaps, heel clicking, hornpipes, and other step dances may have come from various ethnic traditions, or nothing more than an individual improvisation. Other early terms used to describe either solo dancing or steps done as part of a circle or square dance were buck-and-wing, flat-footing, double shuffle, hoedown, and breakdown. Jigging was sometimes referred to as "making the splinters fly", and jig contests were sometimes held as side entertainment at dance parties. A Texan "stag dance" held in 1829 included jigs and hornpipes accompanied by patting juba. Music was often provided by fiddlers, many of whom were black, or with improvised "instruments": clevis and pin, scraping on a cotton hoe with a knife, patting of the foot, blowing on a comb through a thin piece of paper, tapping against drinking glasses, or even blowing on a peach leaf. Military bands and string bands were used in larger towns and/or on special occasions.

Dances on the prairie frontier included the scamperdown, double shuffle, western-swing, and half-moon.

"Frolics" were community events often associated with communal work such as corn shucking or house raising. When the work was complete, the participants celebrated with a feast and dancing. A fiddler, often a black man, was the main source of music for dances at these events. The banjo, too, derived from earlier African instruments, was also important. Reels, square dances, waltzes, polkas and other couple dances were performed with a spirit of freedom and improvisation, which music historian Bill C. Malone describes as "all so mingled that it is a dance without a name".

In West Texas, large dance events were a major community function. Those held at ranches were sometimes called "ranch dances". Dances for local people in smaller areas lasted for the evening, and the participants would go home after. Larger dances drew participants from a wider area, some of whom travelled by horseback or car to attend. Because it would be tiring to return the same day, these events could go on all night. While children slept, adults danced and socialized until morning. Unusually, the cooking at these events was handled by cowboys rather than women. They would serve a large midnight meal of barbecue and other country foods. When crowds were large, dancers would take turns dancing, paying a fee each time they danced so that the musicians could be paid.

=== 1920s onwards ===
Commercialization of country music ramped up in the 1920s. Despite that trend, dance parties in private homes were still popular in the American South, featuring popular music played by fiddlers. Although many of the songs they played, such as "The Sailor's Hornpipe", or "The Virginia Reel" were once associated with specific dances, these associations faded over the years until the songs were completely separated from their original dances.

From the late 1930s to the 1950s, Western swing was extremely popular at dance venues in the Great Plains. Popular steps for the dance-focused style included foxtrots, waltzes of the "Mexican" and "cowboy" varieties, and even simple one-step and two-steps.

The extensive movements of workers and troops within the United States and overseas as a result of World War II indirectly caused the spread of country music, as enthusiasts brought their favored music and dances to their new homes. During World War II, the Venice neighborhood of Los Angeles teemed with National Guardsmen keeping watch for enemy ships. As a result, Venice developed a bustling nightlife scene of dance halls and lounges that featured country western and swing music.

From 1951 to 1961, the largest barn dance in California was held in Compton. Broadcast on radio and television as the Town Hall Party, the Town Hall featured popular country and western musicians of the day.

During the 1970s and 1980s, the country and western dance club Gilley's Club in Pasadena, Texas was certified by the Guinness Book of World Records as the world's largest nightclub, with a capacity of 6,000 people and a floor space of 48,000 square feet (4,500 m^{2}).

One writer, Skippy Blair, noted in 1994 that, "At this writing, Country has become the dance of the decade." Blair lists Two Step, Waltz, East Coast Swing and West Coast Swing as the most popular couple country dances.

=== Clogging ===
Clogging is a step dance which is usually danced in groups to bluegrass music. It originates from the Appalachian region and is associated with the predecessor to bluegrass — "old-time" music, which is based on Irish and Scots-Irish fiddle tunes. It could be described as a more animated version of Irish step dance or a country version of tap dancing. There are dance competitions for clogging.

== See also ==
- List of basic dance topics
- Country dance
- United Country Western Dance Council
