= Colin Campbell and his Highland Band =

Scottish west coast swing band

Colin Campbell and His Highland Band were a west coast swing band in Scotland through the mid-1960s to the 1980s. Dressed in Ancient Campbell tartan jackets, they released several albums, EPs, singles and cassette tapes for both the Beltona/Decca and Lismor Recording Companies.

== Career ==
The band performed numerous shows and dances throughout their career, from Lewis to London. They played various venues included village halls, hotels, and theatres, including The Royal Albert Hall and The Festival Hall in London.

Colin Campbell and his Highland Band represented Scotland at the Welsh Eisteddfod for two years running playing with Alasdair Gillies, Jimmy Shand, Edinburgh City Pipe Band, The Corries and many others.

Colin Campbell and his Highland Band accompanied Alasdair Gillies in over sixty programmes with Scottish Television in the early seventies called "Alasdair Sings" and on many tours. Colin also worked with many other leading Gaelic singers including Donald Macrae, Calum Kennedy and Norman Maclean.

They were also invited to Canada three times to star on a series called Ceilidh which reached number one on the Canadian Network. The first visit was in 1973 with Calum Kennedy. The next visit was a year later in 1974, again with Calum Kennedy, also Helen MacArthur (soprano) and Campbell also played along with The Cape Breton Fiddlers. The third and final visit was in 1975 and joining them on this trip were, Alasdair Gillies, and Robin Hall and Jimmie Macgregor.

During the 1980s and 1990s, Campbell gave up touring with the band to concentrate on playing in local hotels and restaurants, such as McTavish's Kitchens and The Park Hotel in Oban, entertaining the summer tourists and locals. Campbell was also in the resident trio at the Strathspey Hotel in Aviemore for three years.

== Personal life ==
Colin retired and lived in Oban with his wife Lorna until his death in September 2015.
