= Coaster Step =

A Coaster Step is a term used in swing dancing which originated in Lindy swing. During the last two beats of a rhythm pattern, the follower rotated 90° to be perpendicular to the leader, then stepped back, together, and forward in triple-rhythm (three weight changes in two beats of music), then rotated back to face the leader and to be ready to step forward as the leader led the follower in to begin the next pattern.

Arthur Murray mistakenly codified the Lindy coaster step into its "Western Swing" curriculum as having the follower simply continue to face the leader and step back, together, and forward toward the leader during the last two beats of a pattern. In later years, this form of swing has been termed "Ballroom Swing" to distinguish it from other forms.

When dancing with a Lindy dancer using this form of the Coaster Step, the connection between leader and follower was broken on the last beat of the pattern as the follower stepped forward and the Lindy leader remained in place.

In the 1950s, West Coast Swing was popularized by Skippy Blair, who within time introduced the Anchor Step for use during the last two beats of each rhythm pattern for both leaders and followers.

Technically, Skippy Blair defined the anchor step as keeping the center-point-of-balance (solar plexus) behind the heel of the forward foot throughout the last two beats of each West Coast Swing pattern, providing wide latitude for dancers to express themselves. The most common version of the anchor step uses triple-rhythm. The forward foot remains in place and the rear foot remains in place in 3rd foot position. Weight is transferred from front to back on the first weight change, begins to transfer back to the forward foot but is "checked" on the second weight change, and is transferred back to the rear foot on the third weight change.

Skippy Blair measured movement using "rolling count" (&a1, &a2, etc.), which helps facilitate body flight in dance. Using this measurement technique learned from studying the movement of champion West Coast Swing competitors, the weight changes at the end of a six-count rhythm pattern (&a5&a6) occur on count '5', the 'a' count before count '6', and on count '6'. Most often it is the follower's step. As of 1994, the Coaster Step was still used in "Ballroom Swing", and is an identifying feature of that dance.

== Coaster Step used instead of Anchor Step ==
Note: The Anchor Step had not yet been created when Lindy dancers who used the original Coaster Step were dancing street swing, nor when Laure Haile defined what became a modified version of the Coaster Step for Western Swing at Arthur Murray dance studios.

The name "coaster step" denotes original function of the step, which was to gradually diminish a partner's momentum through the last two beats of any pattern until the body has slowed enough to change direction or velocity easily without exerting too much force on either the dancer or the partnership.

The Bronze Level syllabus for Western Swing included in the Dance Book written in the 1950s by Arthur Murray Dance Studios National Director, and Los Angeles basin resident, Lauré Haile, defined a "Coaster Step" as cross forward place, or back together side, or back forward back. Her written description of the step(s) does not include any swiveling. However, her written description variations of the second triple of the "Basic Throwout" includes the following, "On the 2nd 1-2-3 the girl can take a sharp turn LEFT... Her styling here is to be on the balls of both feet, with both knees bent and pointing to her LEFT."

Although Haile used the term "Twinkle" to refer to a "back-together-forward" triple step, the 1971 edition of the "Encyclopedia of Social Dance" defined "Coaster Step" as "back-together-forward" in its description of "Western Swing".
