= West Coast Swing =

Dance style

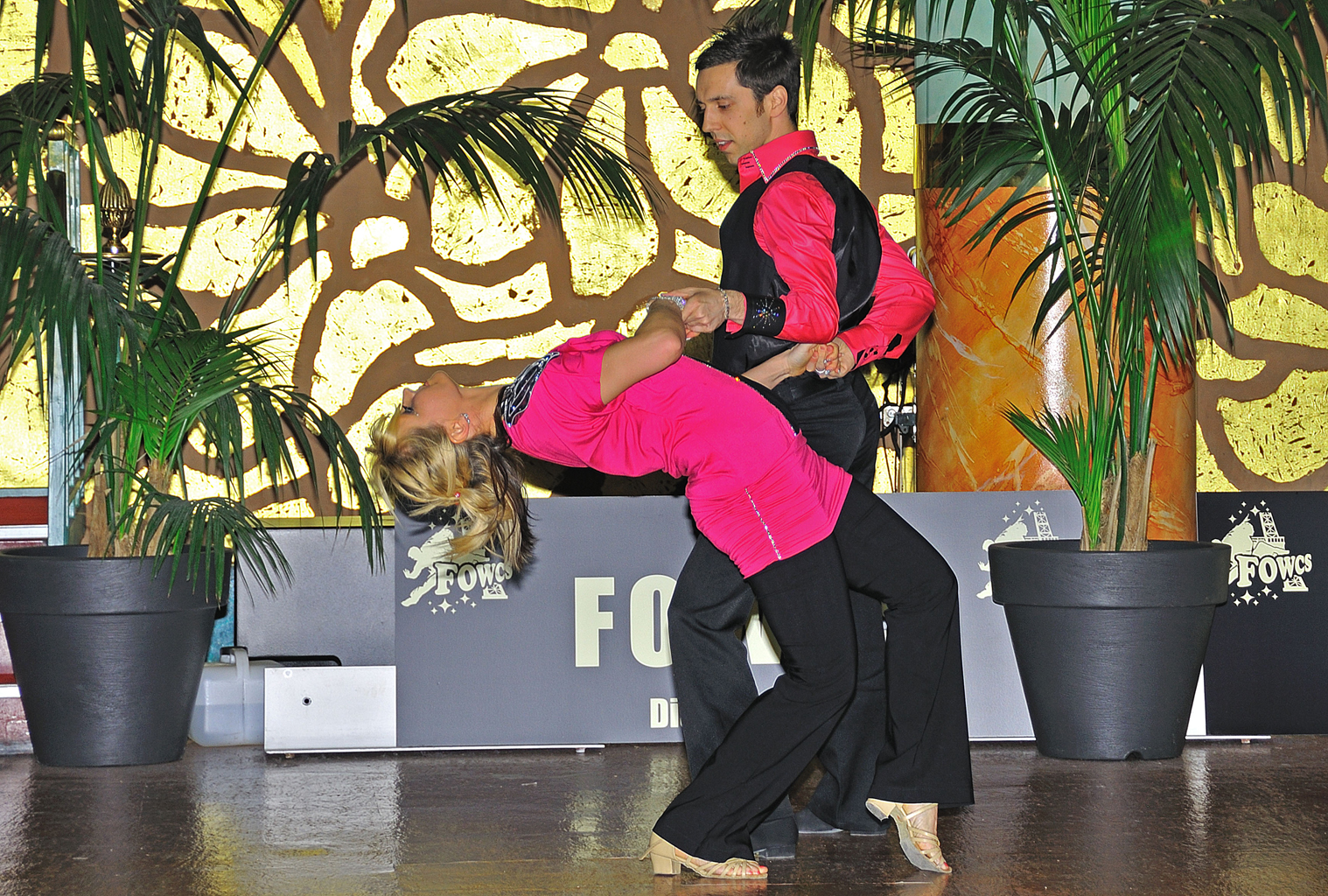
West Coast Swing

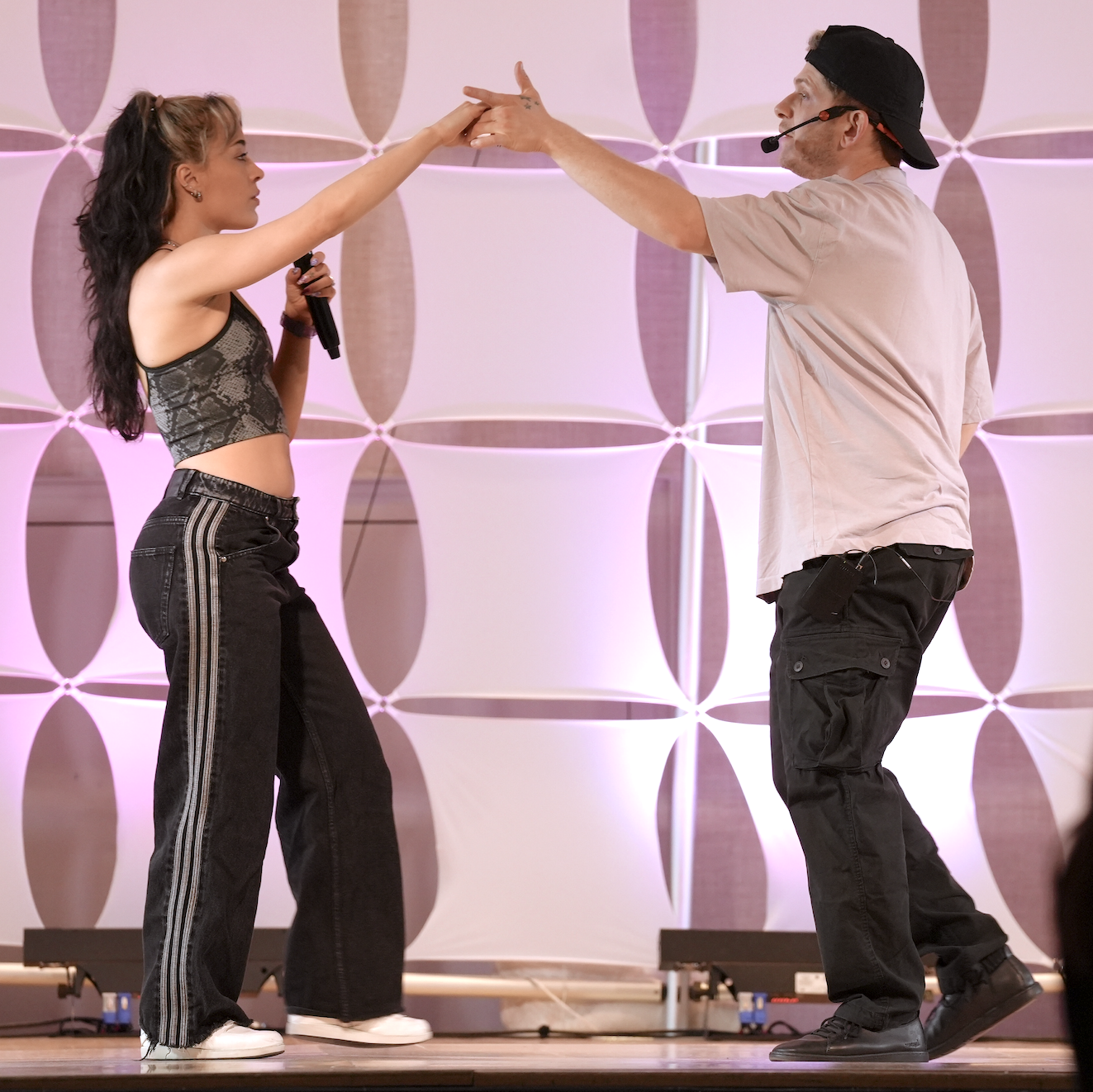
Nicole & Thibault Ramirez, West Coast Swing instructors

West Coast Swing is a partner dance with roots in Lindy Hop, characterized by an elastic look that results from its extension-compression technique of partner connection. It is danced primarily in a slotted area on the dance floor. The dance allows for both partners to improvise steps while dancing together, putting West Coast Swing in a short list of dances that emphasize improvisation.

== History ==
The origins of the West Coast Swing are in the Lindy Hop. Western swing, country boogie, and, with a smaller audience, jump blues were popular on the West Coast throughout the 1940s and into the 1950s when they were renamed and marketed as rock and roll in 1954. Dancers danced "a 'swingier' more smooth and subdued" form of jitterbug to Western swing music.

Dean Collins, a lindy hop dancer who arrived in the Los Angeles area around 1937, was influential in developing the style of swing dance on the West Coast of the United States as both a performer and teacher. Collins was humble about his contributions to the style. According to one of his former students, a member of his last dance troupe, Collins himself said that he had nothing to do with the West Coast Swing style.

Lessons in "The New West Coast Swing" were offered at the Arthur Murray Dance Studios in San Bernardino and Riverside, California in December 1948. By 1954 West Coast Swing was taught from Southern California to Vancouver B.C. and from Eastern Washington to Hawaii. By 1957 the dance had reached as far east as Missouri.

Laure' Haile, an Arthur Murray Dance Studio National Dance Director, documented the unique style of swing dancing in Los Angeles in 1951 using the name "Western Swing" to describe it. Arthur Murray Dance Studios developed a syllabus for West Coast Swing from her notes. The Arthur Murray style taught Western Swing beginning from a closed position and the possibility of dancing single, double, or triple rhythm. After "Throwout" patterns began with the woman "walking in" and the man doing a "rock step", or step together for counts one and two. Although the dance remained basically the same, the Golden State Dance Teachers Association (GSDTA) began teaching from the walk steps, counts 1 and 2. It replaced Laure Haile's Coaster Step with an "Anchor Step" around 1961.

"West Coast Swing" as a synonym for "Western swing" appears in a 1961 dance book. The name was used in an advertisement by ballroom dancer Skippy Blair circa 1958–1962. However, the term wasn't incorporated into mainstream swing circles until the late 1960s. Blair preferred the name "West Coast Swing" because of the ambiguous meaning of "Western" (in dance, usually referring to country and western), as distinguished from "West Coast," referring to California, where the style was actually developed. Blair credits Jim Bannister, editor of the Herald American newspaper in Downey, California, for suggesting the name West Coast Swing.

While teenagers preferred to dance freestyle through a constantly changing succession of discotheque social dance fads during the 1960s, adults kept swing alive. In the mid-1970s, the advent of disco music revitalized partner dancing. In California, West Coast Swing was one of the popular dances of the era. By 1978, "California Swing" had developed as a variation of West Coast Swing, with styling that Blair wrote was "considered more UP, with a more Contemporary flavor." By 1978 GSDTA had "some 200 or more patterns and variations" for West Coast Swing."

In 1988, West Coast Swing was pronounced the Official State Dance of California.

When Disco fell out of favor, West Coast Swing was one of the dances done in country western bars in Los Angeles. and an instructional booklet for the dance was advertised with a heading of "Cowboy Dancing!". By the 1990s country western dancers were dancing West Coast Swing to contemporary country western songs.

== Slot ==
West Coast Swing dancing in Maryland in December 2023

West Coast Swing is a slotted dance, which means that the steps of the dance are confined to an imaginary "slot" on the dance floor. For West Coast Swing, the slot is a long, thin, rectangular area whose length depends on the tempo of the music – it can be eight or nine feet long for slower songs, but will be shorter for faster music. The follower travels back and forth in the slot, while the leader moves only minimally. When the follower reaches the leader, the leader moves a minimal amount (at mid-way point) to the side, barely out of the follower's way. The follower in turn lightly brushes against the leader each time they pass.

The use of the "dance slot" for energetic and improvisational dances like the West Coast Swing allows for dancers to dance on a crowded dance floor without colliding with other couples; remaining within one's slot is considered proper etiquette. Couples usually establish their own slot parallel with dancers who have already established a space on the dance floor. If the dance floor is not crowded and the couple is afforded more space, such as during a competitive event, the dancers may move the slot around the floor more liberally.

There are urban myths regarding the origin of the slotted style. According to one version, it was an invention of Hollywood film makers who wanted "dancers to stay in the same plane, to avoid going in and out of focus".

== Associated musical styles ==
West Coast Swing can be traced to the swing era of jazz. During this period many jazz, blues, and country musicians incorporated swing in their music. Writing in the Arthur Murray Silver Dance Notebook, Laure Haile, who first described "Western Swing", listed the following songs as "Good Swing or Fox Trot Records":

- "Let's Dance" by Ray Anthony ((Capitol L-258)(1951))
- "Be-Bop's Spoken Here" by Les Brown Columbia 38499 (4/14/49)
- "One Mint Julep", Buddy Morrow, Victor 20-4869 (June/July 1952)
- "Dry Bones", Tommy Dorsey, Victor 20-3523 (1949?)

Western Swing was documented in the 1971 edition of the Encyclopedia of Social Dance, listing the "Coaster Step" (with a forward step as the last step of the second triple) rather than the Anchor Step. The one song that was listed for this dance was "Comin' On" by Bill Black's Combo (1964 Hi #2072).

West Coast Swing can be danced to almost any music written in 4/4 time. In the past, the ideal speed for West Coast Swing was cited as 32 measures per minute or 128 bpm, compared to the recommended 112 bpm for Western Swing. In its 2014–2016 rules, the United Country Western Dance Council (UCWDC) specified a range of 102–114 bpm with a preferred speed of 108 bpm "for all." West Coast Swing dancers have adopted music genres such as hip hop and blues, both of which often range well below 100 bpm.

== Basic guidelines ==
West Coast Swing is an evolving social dance that has gone through many changes throughout its short history, over time incorporating techniques from numerous dance styles. However, there are many guidelines that should be followed to maintain the true character of the dance. A dance's character is typically defined by a basic philosophy, principles of movement, and traditional steps and figures. While these guidelines can be violated, by committing too many violations one risks departing from the defining features of the dance.

Modern West Coast Swing is in large part defined by an emphasis on musicality and connection. Movement is based on a principle borrowed from ballroom and Latin dance in which the dancer moves their center of gravity immediately over the foot when a weight transfer is desired. Traditional figures include 6-count and 8-count patterns of one of the four basic varieties: (1) Starter Step, (2) Side Pass, (3) Push Break / Sugar Push, (4) Whip. Many common West Coast Swing figures are derived from simple variations of these basic figures. West Coast Swing is also a fundamentally improvised dance, and thus such defined figures are simply starting points for the skilled dancer. Additionally, West Coast Swing can be said to rely on the leader creating and redirecting the momentum of the follower in order to communicate how they wish to lead the dance. The follower's step is different from the leader's; partners do not mirror each other. The Anchor Step is a common ending pattern of many West Coast Swing figures.

For West Coast Swing, the leader in the dance uses body-leading, as opposed to arm-leading.

Dancing to different types of music gives a different feel and look. In writing about West Coast Swing, Skippy Blair said, "The only problem that exists in swing is when someone decides there is only one way to dance it. There is never only one way to do anything." In 1994 Blair noted that the posture for men had trended to be more upright than in previous years.

A 1998 summary of trends in West Coast Swing distinguished the traditional or classic style from modern variations as follows:

- Traditional/Classic: minimal extension of the free arm, the leader moves off and on the center of the track for most moves
- Modern: the free arm may be extended for style, emphasis on large number of spins and other flourishes

=== Basic figures ===
The following are some examples of basic West Coast Swing patterns. Most are performed with the same "step step tri-ple-step tri-ple-step" pattern equalling eight steps in six beats of music. The term "count" is used as a synonym for a "beat", usually a quarter note, of music.

- Underarm pass: Also called the right-side pass. A six-count basic where the follower is led to the other end of the slot, passing on the leader's right (right side pass), typically under the leader's arm (underarm pass).
- Left-side pass: A six-count basic where the follower is led to the other end of the slot, passing on the leader's left.
- Tuck pass: Similar to a left side pass in six counts, except that the leader creates a "tuck" action on the second count by turning the follower towards themselves and then reversing their direction back toward the slot on the fourth count. Then the follower turns under the leader's left arm – either a half turn or a turn and a half – on the final two counts.
- Sugar push: Also called the "push break" or "six-count basic". In this six-count move, the follower, facing the leader, is led from the end of the slot to a one- or two-hand hold, then led back to the same end of the slot. The deceptively simple pattern requires "compression" or "resistance" with firm but flexible arms, and no excessive pushing or pulling . While the arms remain firm but flexible, there should be no excessive pushing or pulling in the arms but in the body. The Sugar Push has been around since 1952.
- Whip: An eight-count basic with many variations. In a basic whip, the follower is led past the leader and then redirected (or "whipped") back towards the end of slot from which they started. The basic footwork for a whip extends the six-count pattern by inserting a pair of walking steps between the triple steps. The footwork is therefore "step step tri-ple-step step step tri-ple-step." The whip is an evolution of the Lindy Hop basic, but with a smoother and more grounded west coast swing interpretation.

== Competitions ==
West Coast Swing, though a social dance, has competitions that are organized at dance events. There are 2 main competitions:

Jack & Jill (J&J) is a West Coast Swing competition format in which leaders and followers enter separately and are randomly paired with partners during preliminary, semifinal and final rounds. Judges evaluate couples on criteria including connection, musicality and technique. The format requires dancers to adapt to different partners and improvise within the dance. Placements in Jack and Jill competitions can contribute toward World Swing Dance Council (WSDC) points.

Strictly Swing is a partner-registered competitive format where dancers sign up as a pre-formed couple rather than being randomly drawn. Partners typically rehearse together before the event. Unlike Jack & Jill, the same couple competes together through all rounds. It's a popular format for dancers who want to showcase polished partnering with someone they know well. Strictly Swing placements also award WSDC points.

There are other competitions like All European/American/... those are themes competitions mostly about who has the most fun and not based on technique.

== Global spread ==
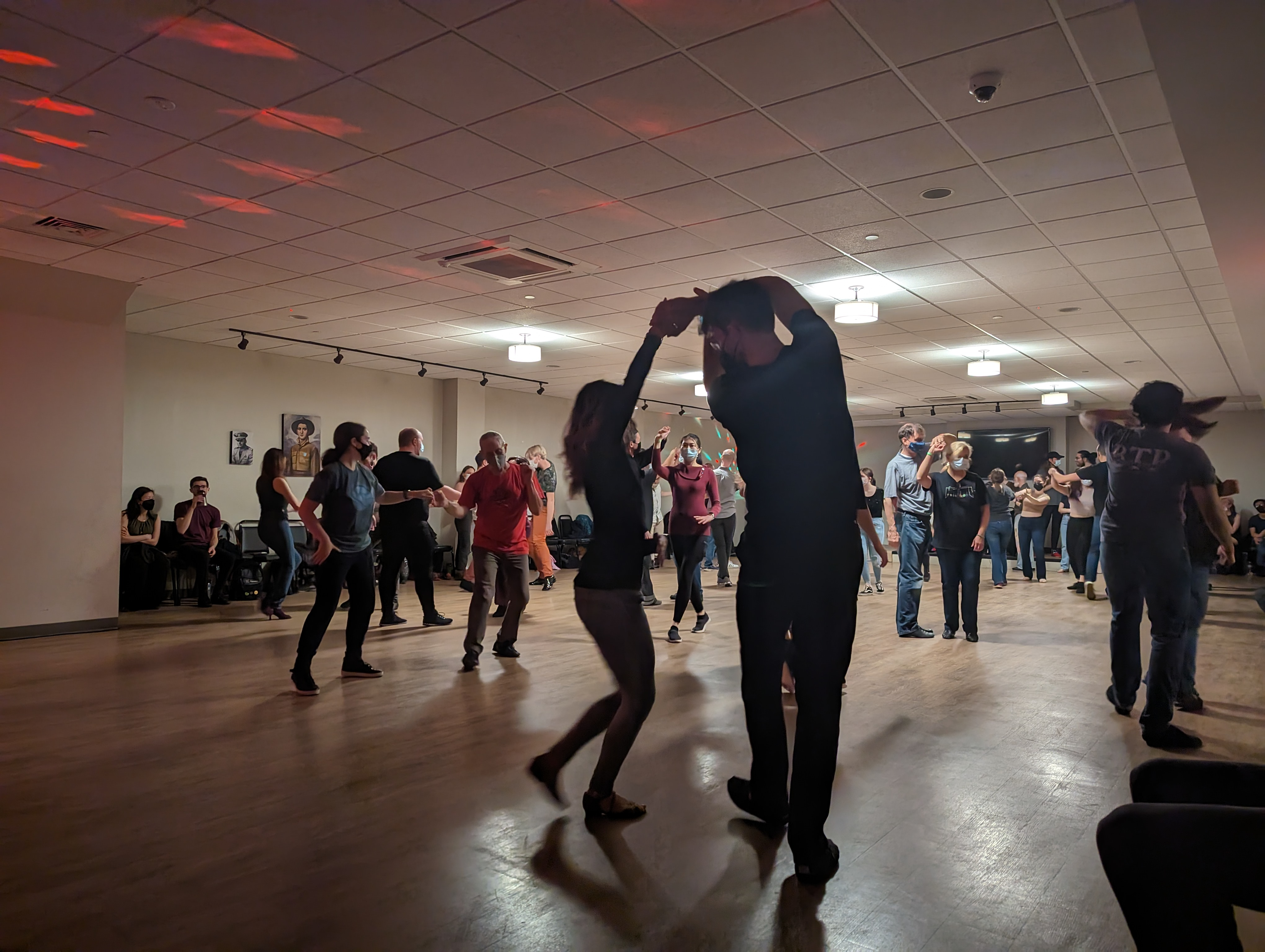
A West Coast Swing dance in Somerville, Massachusetts, in 2022

West Coast Swing is danced all over the world. It is most popular in the United States, and has spread across the country since its inception.

Internationally, West Coast Swing is popular in France, Russia, Germany, Switzerland, Israel, Iceland, New Zealand, Australia, Austria, Poland, Singapore, Hungary, Romania, Latvia, Spain, Sweden, Norway, Netherlands, Finland, Belarus, Panama City, Slovenia, and the United Kingdom.

In most countries there are classes and events happening throughout the year.

== See also ==
- Colin Campbell and his Highland Band
- East Coast Swing
- Lindy Hop
