= Aaron Latham =

American journalist (1943–2022)

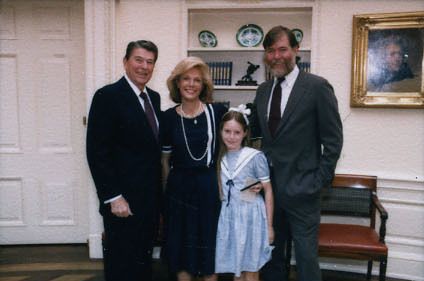
- Aaron Latham with his family and Ronald Reagan, 1986
- Born: October 3, 1943; Spur, Texas, U.S.
- Died: July 23, 2022 (aged 78); Bryn Mawr, Pennsylvania, U.S.
- Education: Amherst College (BA)
- Spouse: Lesley Stahl (m. 1977)
- Children: 1

Aaron Latham (October 3, 1943 – July 23, 2022) was an American journalist and screenwriter who was known for the films Urban Cowboy (1980), Perfect (1985), and The Program (1993).

== Biography ==
Latham was born on October 3, 1943, in Spur, Texas. He was raised in a Methodist family, the son of Annie Launa (Cozby) and Cecil Clyde Latham. Latham attended Amherst College, where he studied literature and served as an editor on the Amherst Student, the college newspaper, graduating in 1966.

== Career ==
He was a regular contributor to such publications as Rolling Stone, Esquire, Talk, and The New York Times. He wrote the article that inspired the 1980 movie Urban Cowboy and co-wrote its script with director James Bridges. He also co-wrote the book for the short-lived 2003 Broadway musical version. He also wrote novels and co-wrote the screenplays Perfect, also with Bridges, another film inspired by his articles, and The Program. He wrote "Crazy Sundays", published in 1971, which is a F. Scott Fitzgerald biography about his years in "Hollywood". It epitomizes the reality of life after fame in Hollywood.

== Personal life ==
Latham married CBS News and 60 Minutes correspondent Lesley Stahl in 1977. Their daughter is named Taylor. He died of complications from Parkinson's disease on July 23, 2022, at the age of 78.
