= Could I Have This Dance =

Single by Anne Murray

from the album Anne Murray's Greatest Hits and Urban Cowboy: Original Motion Picture Soundtrack
- B-side: "Somebody's Waiting"
- Released: August 1980
- Genre: Country
- Length: 3:16
- Label: Capitol
- Songwriters: Wayland Holyfield; Bob House
- Producer: Jim Ed Norman

Anne Murray singles chronology
"I'm Happy Just to Dance with You" (1980)	"Could I Have This Dance" (1980)	"Blessed Are the Believers" (1981)

"Could I Have This Dance" is a song recorded by the Canadian country music artist Anne Murray. It was used in the 1980 film Urban Cowboy and appeared on both the Urban Cowboy soundtrack album for that film, as well as on the Anne Murray's Greatest Hits compilation album, issued in late 1980. Later on, it also appeared on Murray's 2007 album Anne Murray Duets: Friends & Legends, performed as a duet with Amy Grant.

As a single, it was released in August 1980 and became Murray's fifth number one country hit as a solo artist. It went to number one for one week and spent a total of ten weeks on the country chart. "Could I Have This Dance" was also Murray's tenth Top 40 on the U.S. pop singles chart, peaking at number 33. The song was written by Wayland Holyfield and Bob House.

At the 23rd Annual Grammy Awards, Anne Murray won her second Best Country Vocal Performance, Female for this song. Murray won over the likes of Crystal Gayle, Emmylou Harris, Barbara Mandrell and actress/singer Sissy Spacek who was nominated for "Coal Miner's Daughter".

== Charts ==
Chart (1980)	Peak position
Canadian RPM Country Tracks	1
Canadian RPM Adult Contemporary Tracks	1
Canadian RPM Top Singles	19
US Cash Box Top 100	53
US Hot Country Songs (Billboard)	1
US Adult Contemporary (Billboard)	3
US Billboard Hot 100	33
