= Sherwood Cryer =

American entrepreneur (1927–2009)

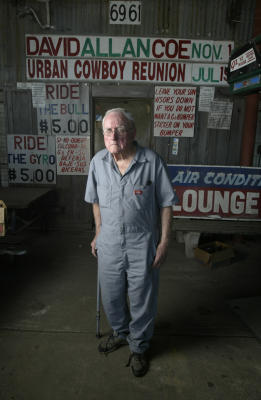
- Cryer in 2007
- Born: Charley Sherwood Cryer; September 2, 1927; Diboll, Texas, US
- Died: August 13, 2009 (aged 81); Pasadena, Texas, US
- Occupation: Entrepreneur

Charley Sherwood Cryer (September 2, 1927 – August 13, 2009) was an American entrepreneur. After forming a partnership with Mickey Gilley, Cryer became co-owner of Gilley's, a Pasadena, Texas-based western nightclub and bar.

== Early life ==
Cryer was born on September 2, 1927, in Diboll, Texas. He moved to Pasadena after World War II, where he worked as a welder for Shell Oil and bought a string of convenience stores, honky-tonks, and bars. In 1971, he hired Mickey Gilley to play piano at Shelly's, his club on Spencer Highway, six nights a week.

== Gilley's Club ==
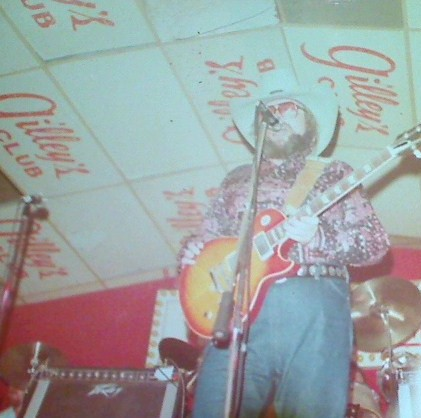
Charlie Daniels on stage at Gilley's Club, 1979

Cryer settled in Pasadena, where his large tent-style honky tonk concept developed into what became Gilley's in 1971, located on a sprawling parcel of land at 4500 Spencer Highway in Pasadena. It was named after country music artist Mickey Gilley. Cryer met Gilley in a bar where Gilley was performing and invited him to become a co-owner of Cryer's new club. Gilley, the cousin of Jerry Lee Lewis, was soon playing six nights a week, helping the new hotspot to attract entertainers like Willie Nelson, Charlie Daniels, Crystal Gayle, Hank Williams Jr., Jerry Lee Lewis, George Jones, Johnny Lee, Conway Twitty, Keith Whitley, and hundreds more.

=== Gilley's success and the mechanical bull ===
Gilley's fame spread in the early 1980s with the help of Cryer's patent-holding, the mechanical bull.

The bull became a huge nightly draw as cowboys from the area took turns testing their skill in front of large crowds. Cryer and Gilley expected lawsuits from patrons getting hurt on the bull but no one sought them. Rides were conducted with a sign posted nearby stating "Ride At Your Own Risk."

=== Urban Cowboy ===
The bull was prominently featured in the 1980 film Urban Cowboy, with actors John Travolta, Debra Winger, and Scott Glenn shown riding the bull in many scenes.

Journalist Aaron Latham became a frequent visitor of the club, and Cryer asked Latham to write about Gilley's. Latham captured the spirit of Gilley's in a cover story for Esquire magazine titled "The Ballad of the Urban Cowboy: America's Search for 'True Grit'" for the September 1978 issue. Music executive Irving Azoff took notice and secured rights to the story for a movie. Latham and director James Bridges co-wrote the screenplay, John Travolta was chosen for the lead role of Bud Davis, and Debra Winger was selected to play Sissy, Bud's romantic interest. The movie was filmed on-location in Pasadena, with all of the club interiors and exteriors filmed at Gilley's, and regular patrons and locals featured as extras. It was a box office hit in 1980, grossing over $50 million. The film's soundtrack showcased a collection of country music's top artists and songs, including the hit "Lookin' for Love" by Johnny Lee.

After the movie's release, the club's popularity skyrocketed. Gilley's launched its own beer brand, radio show, recording studio, and hundreds of merchandise items from drinking glasses and stickers to panties and jeans emblazoned with the Gilley's logo. Gilley's white-and-red bumper stickers were commonly seen on cars throughout the Houston area. Fans would steal tiles from the acoustical ceiling because they were stamped with the club's logo. With Gilley's indoor rodeo arena as an added attraction, the 48,000 square feet (4,500 m^{2}) club hosted a packed house of thousands every night. The space fielded oversized bars and dance floors to accommodate crowds, and the club was so big that visitors could not see from one end of the building to the other. With a capacity of 6,000, Gilley's was listed in the Guinness Book of World Records as the world's largest night club.

Open seven nights a week from 10 am to 2 am, Gilley's regularly featured a myriad of activities, contests, and food. The club offered dozens of pool tables, pinball machines, video arcade games, punching bag games, even strong-arm wrestling games. There were mechanical bulls, mechanical horses, and mechanical calves. Cryer supplied the mattresses that surrounded the mechanical bull, often driving around Pasadena collecting discards based on tips on where to find them. Gilley's staged everything from Dolly Parton look-alike contests to tricycle races, with cowboys often falling off of the trikes to the amusement of the crowd.

A lawsuit between Gilley and Cryer was decided in Gilley's favor in 1987 and the club closed soon after. It burned to the ground in 1990.

== Death ==
Cryer died on August 13, 2009, aged 83, in Pasadena.
