= Dance slot =

In slotted dances, the dance slot is an imaginary narrow rectangle within which the follower moves back and forth in relation to the leader, who is comparatively stationary.

Slotted dances include: West Coast Swing, Dallas Push, Houston Whip, Supreme Swing in Tulsa, Imperial Swing in St. Louis, Alcatraz in New Orleans, Carolina Shag, DC Swing, as well as variants of other dances, such as Salsa or Hustle, that may be performed in a slotted style as well.

As a rule, the leader mostly stays in the slot, leaving it only to make room for the follower to pass by. The leader almost never makes the follower circle around when passing by; they may go into a common rotational figure when the follower happens to come close, but such figures are usually in a tight position and do not change the overall "slotted" appearance.

Factors that have often been looked upon as contributing to the development of slotted dance style include:

1. Maximizing visibility for the audience, when a dance will be performed on the stage.
2. Coping with limited space for dancing.

Although most of the above-mentioned dances belong to the "West Coast Swing family" of dances, they may have developed independently. The differences have been both acknowledged and listed; Swing Dance Encyclopedia by CoupleDanceWorld lists the differences among the dances.

The most typical slotted dance is West Coast Swing. The origin of this style is uncertain. By one theory, the slotted style was born in Hollywood: film directors supposedly wanted to keep the performers in a straight line to keep the profiles of both dancers in sight, which also helps the camera to catch the most action, as opposed to rotational styles, in which much of the time one sees only the back of one dancer with the other dancer hidden completely. Another story is that during jazz concerts the fans were dancing in the aisles (which are essentially slots) and the style stuck. Still another is that this style emerged in densely packed nightclubs. None of the stories has a solid confirmation.
