= Lookin' for Love =

Single by Johnny Lee

from the album Urban Cowboy: Original Motion Picture Soundtrack
- B-side: "Lyin' Eyes"; (by The Eagles)
- Released: June 30, 1980
- Recorded: Spring 1980
- Studio: Sunset Sound Recorders, 6650 Sunset Blvd., Hollywood, California
- Genre: Country pop; soft rock
- Length: 3:37
- Label: Full Moon 47004
- Songwriters: Wanda Mallette, Bob Morrison, Patti Ryan
- Producer: John Boylan

Johnny Lee singles chronology
"This Time" (1978)	"Lookin' for Love" (1980)	"One in a Million" (1980)

"Lookin' for Love" is a song written by Wanda Mallette, Bob Morrison and Patti Ryan, and recorded by American country music singer Johnny Lee. It was released in June 1980 as part of the soundtrack to the film Urban Cowboy, released that year. The background vocalists are Marcy Levy, Rosemary Butler and Tom Kelly. "Lookin' for Love" was reissued as the lead song on Lee's October 1980 album of the same name. Johnny Lee also recorded a Spanish language version of "Lookin' for Love" titled "Buscando Amor".

== Background ==
Lee, whose biggest hit to date had been a 1977 cover of Ricky Nelson's "Garden Party", had been the main nightclub act (behind Mickey Gilley himself) at Gilley's Club, a nightclub owned by Sherwood Cryer and country music superstar Mickey Gilley. Record executive Irving Azoff offered Lee the chance to record "Lookin' For Love", a song that over 20 artists had rejected.

Critical reaction to the song has been mixed. The Boston Globe called it "a powerful new ballad," noting "Lee's rich southern baritone and thick phrasing." AllMusic determined that "the MOR country-pop of 'Lookin' for Love' is so appealing that one suspects it could have been a hit even without the publicity from Urban Cowboy." Country music historian Bill Malone once noted that "Lookin' for Love" – in his words, a "lilting little pop song" – became the featured song of Urban Cowboy and a huge commercial hit largely because "actor John Travolta (the movie's co-star) expressed a liking for it." Critic Kurt Wolff panned the song as an example of "watered-down cowboy music."

Public reaction was better. "Lookin' for Love" rose to No. 1 (for a three-week stay) on the Billboard Hot Country Singles chart, and was a No. 5 Billboard Hot 100 hit as well. On the US Cash Box Top 100, the song spent two weeks at No. 4. The song is now recognized as a standard in country music, praised by country music fans and critics alike.

"Lookin' for Love" was certified gold in 1980 for shipments of 1,000,000 units by the Recording Industry Association of America.

== Series ==
The song was performed by Johnny Lee in an episode of the TV series CHiPs. It could also be heard in episodes 274 and 275 of Dallas. It was also performed live on the episode Colt's Outlaws, of the TV series, The Fall Guy.

== Sawyer Brown version ==
Country music group Sawyer Brown recorded the song on the 2000 album The Hits Live. This version peaked at No. 44 on the Billboard Hot Country Singles & Tracks chart.

== Charts ==
=== Weekly charts ===
Chart (1980)	Peak position
Australia (Kent Music Report)	51
Canada Top Singles (RPM)	54
Canada Adult Contemporary Tracks (RPM)	20
Canada Country Tracks (RPM)	18
US Billboard Hot 100	5
US Adult Contemporary (Billboard)	10
US Cash Box Top 100	4
US Hot Country Songs (Billboard)	1

=== Year-end charts ===
Chart (1980)	Position
US Cash Box Top 100	37
US Hot Country Songs (Billboard)	14

== Sources ==
=== Other sources ===
- AllMusic – "Johnny Lee" entry by Tom Roland.
- Roland, Tom, "The Billboard Book of Number One Country Hits," Billboard Books, Watson-Guptill Publications, New York, 1991. (ISBN 0-82-307553-2)
- Whitburn, Joel, "Top Country Songs: 1944–2005," 2006.
