= Love the World Away =

Single by Kenny Rogers

from the album Urban Cowboy: Original Motion Picture Soundtrack
- B-side: "Sayin' Goodbye/Requiem: Goin' Home to Rock"
- Released: June 23, 1980
- Genre: Country
- Length: 3:11
- Label: Liberty
- Songwriters: Bob Morrison; Johnny Wilson

Kenny Rogers singles chronology
"Don't Fall in Love with a Dreamer" (1980)	"Love the World Away" (1980)	"Lady" (1980)

"Love the World Away" is a song written by Bob Morrison and Johnny Wilson, and recorded by American country music artist Kenny Rogers. It was released in June 1980 as the second single from the Urban Cowboy soundtrack. The song reached number 14 on the Billboard Hot 100, number 4 on the Billboard Hot Country Singles chart and number 8 on the Adult Contemporary chart.

In Canada, "Love the World Away" peaked at number 25 on the pop singles chart, and hit 1 on the RPM Country Tracks chart.

== Charts ==
Chart (1980)	Peak position
Canadian RPM Top Singles	25
Canadian RPM Country Tracks	1
US Billboard Hot 100	14
US Hot Country Songs (Billboard)	4
US Adult Contemporary (Billboard)	8
