= Urban Cowboy =

1980 film by James Bridges

- Theatrical release poster
- Directed by: James Bridges
- Screenplay by: James Bridges; Aaron Latham
- Based on: "The Ballad of the Urban Cowboy" by Aaron Latham
- Produced by: Irving Azoff; Robert Evans
- Starring: John Travolta; Debra Winger; Scott Glenn; Madolyn Smith; Barry Corbin
- Cinematography: Reynaldo Villalobos
- Edited by: David Rawlins
- Music by: Ralph Burns
- Distributed by: Paramount Pictures
- Release dates: June 5, 1980 (Houston); June 6, 1980 (United States)
- Running time: 135 minutes
- Country: United States
- Language: English
- Budget: $13 million
- Box office: $53.3 million

Urban Cowboy is a 1980 American neo-Western romantic drama film directed by James Bridges, based on the 1978 Esquire article "The Ballad of the Urban Cowboy" by Aaron Latham. The film takes place in Pasadena, Texas, and follows the turbulent marriage between young blue-collar couple Buford "Bud" Davis (John Travolta) and Sissy (Debra Winger). Their conflicts unfold against the country-western nightlife of Gilley's Club, a large honky-tonk where dancing, drinking, and mechanical bull riding dominate their social lives.

Urban Cowboy premiered on June 5, 1980, in Houston, and was given a wide theatrical release by Paramount Pictures the following day. The film received mixed to generally positive reviews from critics and was a box-office success, grossing $53.3 million worldwide against a $13 million budget. The film's influence contributed to the early-1980s "Urban Cowboy" movement, which brought country music, western fashion, and associated nightlife into greater mainstream popularity in the United States.

== Plot ==
Buford "Bud" Davis moves to Pasadena, Texas for a job at the oil refinery where his uncle, Bob Davis, works. Bud hopes to earn enough money to buy land near his hometown of Spur. While staying with Bob and his family, Bud embraces the local nightlife, including Gilley's, a popular Pasadena bar and nightclub.

Bud meets fellow Gilley's patron Sissy, and the two fall in love. They soon marry, buy a mobile home, and settle into a routine of working during the day and socializing at Gilley's at night. Bud enjoys riding the mechanical bull, but when Sissy wants to try it, he forbids her, insisting that women should not ride it.

Wes Hightower, a recently paroled bank robber and prison rodeo champion, is hired to operate Gilley's mechanical bull. One evening, a drunken Bud becomes enraged when Wes flirtatiously tips his hat at Sissy. A fistfight ensues, with Wes besting Bud. Wanting to impress Bud, Sissy secretly spends time at Gilley's, where Wes teaches her how to ride the mechanical bull.

While out at Gilley's, Sissy displays her bull-riding skills, but Bud becomes angry that she defied him. Attempting to match her, Bud gets on the bull, but Wes intentionally operates it erratically, causing Bud to fall off and break his arm. At home, Sissy argues that Bud is jealous because she rides the bull better, causing Bud to slap her and throw her out of the house. Several nights later, Bud sees Sissy at Gilley's and smiles at her, though she ignores him. Bud retaliates by dancing with Pam, a wealthy oilman's daughter, and makes sure that Sissy sees them leaving together. Sissy moves in with Wes, who lives in a run-down trailer next to Gilley's.

Unable to work while his arm is in a cast, Bud decides to compete in Gilley's upcoming mechanical bull-riding contest for the $5,000 prize. While Bud trains with his uncle, a former rodeo champion, Sissy stops by the mobile home to collect her belongings. While there, she cleans and leaves Bud a note saying she hopes they can reconcile. Pam finds the note and throws it away, while Bud later assumes that Pam did the cleaning. Meanwhile, Sissy catches Wes in bed with Marshalene, who works at Gilley's. When Sissy reacts angrily, Wes slaps her.

Bob urges Bud to reconcile with Sissy, citing how excessive pride once nearly ruined his own marriage. Soon after, Bob is killed by a refinery explosion, devastating Bud. Sissy arrives at the funeral, where she tells Bud that Wes was fired from Gilley's and that they plan to leave for Mexico after Wes wins the contest. A despondent Bud plans to skip the contest, but his Aunt Corene insists that Bob would have wanted him to compete.

Bud participates in the contest and narrowly beats Wes to win, but is disappointed that Sissy is not there to see him on the winner's podium. Realizing that Bud still loves Sissy, Pam tells him about Sissy's note and urges him to reconcile with her. Not wanting to move to Mexico, Sissy attempts to leave Wes at his trailer, but he strikes her in the face and forces her to accompany him. Before departing in Sissy's car, Wes sneaks into Gilley's main office armed with a pistol to steal the prize money.

Bud finds Sissy in the parking lot, tells her that he loves her, and apologizes for hitting her earlier. When Bud sees Sissy's bruised face, he runs to the bar's entrance and attacks Wes, causing his gun and the stolen money to fall from his jacket. After a bloodied Wes is apprehended by bystanders, Bud and Sissy reconcile and kiss inside Bud's truck.

== Cast ==
- John Travolta as Buford Uan "Bud" Davis
- Debra Winger as Sissy
- Scott Glenn as Wes Hightower
- Madolyn Smith as Pam
- Barry Corbin as Bob Davis
- Brooke Alderson as Corene Davis
- Cooper Huckabee as Marshall
- James Gammon as Steve Strange
- Mickey Gilley as himself
- Johnny Lee as himself
- Bonnie Raitt as herself
- Charlie Daniels as himself
- Ellen March as Becky
- Jessie La Rive as Jessie
- Connie Hanson as Marshalene
- Tamara Champlin as Gilley Background Vocalist
- Becky Conway as Gilley Background Vocalist
- Jerry Hall as Sexy Sister
- Cyndy Hall as Sexy Sister
- Howard Henson as himself

== Production ==
=== Writing ===
The film's screenplay was adapted from an article titled "The Ballad of the Urban Cowboy: America’s Search for True Grit", written by Aaron Latham and first published in the September 12, 1978, issue of Esquire. The original article centered on the lives and marriage of two Gilley's regulars, 19-year-old Donald Edward "Dew" Westbrook and 18-year-old Betty Helmer, who became direct inspirations for the film's characters Bud and Sissy, respectively. Two months after the article was published, producer Irving Azoff reportedly paid $200,000 to Esquire and Gilley's owner Mickey Gilley for the story rights.

=== Casting ===
Dennis Quaid was initially Latham's first choice to portray Bud, while Sissy Spacek and Michelle Pfeiffer were considered for the role of Sissy. John Travolta was the first actor cast; he had previously been attached to star in American Gigolo, but left before production and signed on to play Bud. Though producer Robert Evans sought someone other than Debra Winger for the role of Sissy, reportedly describing her as "unfuckable", director James Bridges threatened to quit if she was not cast.

=== Filming ===
Principal photography took place from July 2, 1979 to November 6, 1979, first in the Greater Houston area and then in Los Angeles. Hundreds of extras were drawn from Gilley's regular clientele, nicknamed "Gilleyrats", while some local refinery employees altered their work schedules to participate as background actors.

To prepare for the film, Travolta installed a mechanical bull and a dance floor at his ranch in Santa Barbara. Dance scenes were choreographed by Patsy Swayze, which launched her career as a film choreographer.

== Soundtrack ==
The film featured a hit soundtrack album spawning numerous Top 10 Billboard Country Singles, such as #1 "Lookin' for Love" by Johnny Lee, #1 "Stand by Me" by Mickey Gilley, #3 (AC chart) "Look What You've Done to Me" by Boz Scaggs, #1 "Could I Have This Dance" by Anne Murray and #4 "Love the World Away" by Kenny Rogers. It also included songs that were hits from earlier years such as #1 "The Devil Went Down to Georgia" by the Charlie Daniels Band and "Lyin' Eyes" by the Eagles. In December 2018, the soundtrack was certified triple platinum by the RIAA for sales of three million copies.

== Release ==
Urban Cowboy premiered at the Gaylynn Theater in Houston on June 5, 1980, followed by an afterparty at Gilley's attended by around 3,600 people, including cast members, Paramount executives, and regular club patrons.

The film was a box-office success, grossing $46.9 million in the United States against a budget of $13 million and becoming the thirteenth-highest grossing film of 1980.

== Reception ==
=== Critical response ===
The film received generally positive reviews from critics. On Rotten Tomatoes, the film holds a 71% "Fresh" rating based on 24 reviews, with an average rating of 6.6/10. On Metacritic, the film has a weighted average score of 61 out of 100 based on 12 critics, indicating "generally favorable" reviews.

Vincent Canby of The New York Times praised the film's commentary, stating "Urban Cowboy is not only most entertaining but also first-rate social criticism," and described Winger as "the most exciting new actress on the screen". Variety staff wrote: "Director James Bridges has ably captured the atmosphere of one of the most famous chip-kicker hangouts of all: Gilley's Club on the outskirts of Houston." Conversely, Gary Arnold of The Washington Post panned the film, stating that it "ends up as a counterfeit endorsement of the so-called simpler so-called values."

Many critics compared the film's depiction of country nightlife to the disco culture depicted in the 1977 film Saturday Night Fever, which also starred Travolta in the lead role.

=== Impact ===
The film's success sparked a mainstream revival of country music, along with increased interest in line dancing and western wear. The "Urban Cowboy Movement" was a term used to describe the pop-influenced country music of the early 1980s epitomized by Kenny Rogers, Dolly Parton, Johnny Lee, Mickey Gilley, Janie Fricke, and other artists who achieved commercial success during the era.

== Proposed TV series adaptation ==
On May 28, 2015, it was announced that 20th Century Fox Television had partnered with Paramount Television to adapt Urban Cowboy into a television series, with Craig Brewer set to write and direct the pilot and executive produce the series. Chris Levinson was set to serve as showrunner and executive producer alongside Robert Evans and Sue Naegle. In December 2015, Fox declined to move forward with the pilot.

On February 1, 2022, it was announced that another television adaptation was in development at Paramount+, with James Ponsoldt set to direct and co-write alongside Benjamin Percy.

== See also ==
- Country music
