= Round dance =

Type of ballroom dance

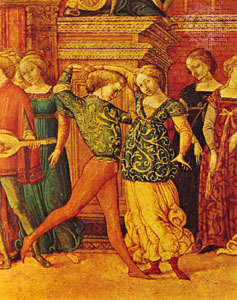
Ballroom dancing in Siena, Italy, 15th century painting

Modern social round dance, or round dancing, is a choreographed and cued ballroom dance that progresses in a circular counter-clockwise pattern around the dance floor. The two major categories of ballroom dances found in round dancing are the smooth and international ballroom styles (such as foxtrot and waltz) and the Latin dances (such as cha-cha-chá, salsa, and rhumba). It is not to be confused with circle dancing, which is a type of folk dance in which dancers are connected in a circular chain.

== Description ==
Round dancing differs from free-style ballroom dancing in that each round dance has been fully choreographed ahead of time, and a "cuer" or leader at the front of the ballroom tells the dancers, as they dance, what steps to do. As the music plays, and just ahead of the beat, so the dancers have time to respond, the cuer names each dance figure in the choreography. As a consequence, all the dancers on the floor are dancing the same steps at the same time.

To create a round dance, a piece of music is selected by the choreographer, and the different steps or figures are chosen to fit the music. If the music swells and pauses briefly, then a dance step that rises and stretches is put into that place. If there is a little syncopation in another part of the music, then a quick step is inserted. The creation of a piece of choreography is like engineering a machine, with every gear and lever in just the right place to give smooth and flowing motion. The step-by-step instructions on how to dance this choreography are written out in what is called a cue sheet.

== Types ==
Examples of social dances that may be danced in "round" fashion are bolero, cha-cha-cha, foxtrot, hustle, jive, mambo, merengue, paso doble, quickstep, rhumba, salsa, samba, single swing, slow two step, tango, two step, waltz, Viennese waltz and West Coast swing.

Roundalab, the International Association of Round Dance Teachers, Inc., has established a "Phase Rating System" of round dancing, in order to rate round dance figures according to difficulty and complexity.

Salsa rueda, also referred to as casino de rueda, is a kind of round dance in which there is no complete pre-choreographed sequence, and the dance patterns are called out in a random order.

== See also ==
- La Ronde (play)
- Rondeau (dance)
- Line dancing
- Romvong, a popular Cambodian round dance
