= Country-western two-step =

North American dance

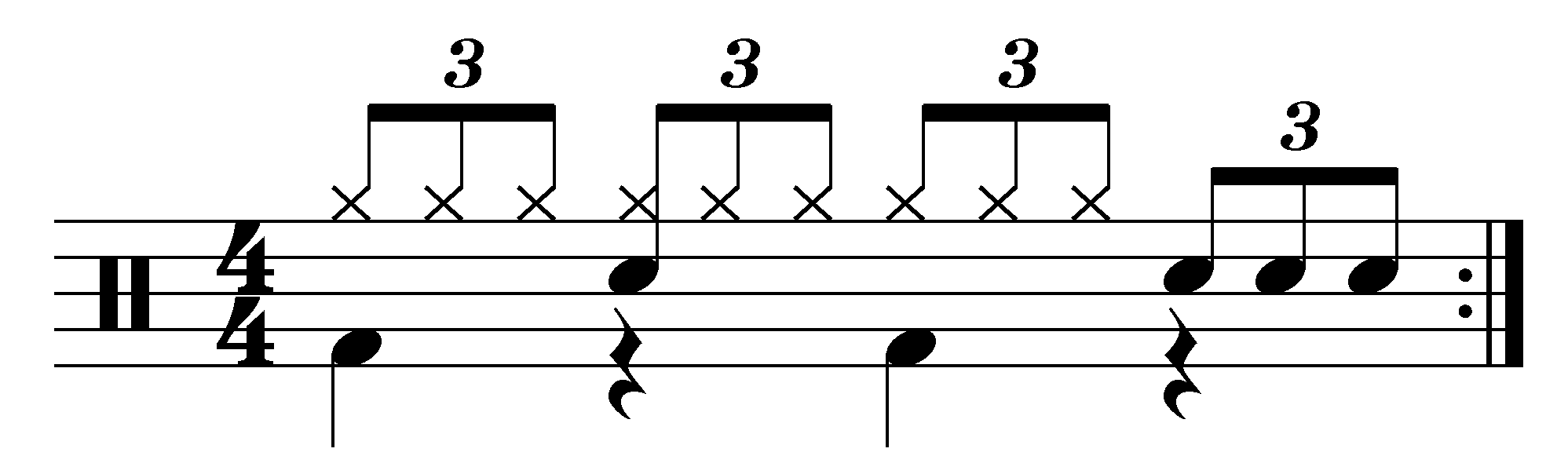
Drum pattern known as the "Texas three-step" due to its association with the dance step

The country/western two-step, often called the Texas two-step or simply the two-step, is a country/western dance usually danced to country music in common time. "Traditional [Texas] two-step developed, my theory goes, because it is suited to fiddle and guitar music played two-four time with a firm beat [found in country music]. One-two, one-two, slide-shuffle. The two-step is related to the polka, the Texas waltz, and the jitterbug.

The Texas two-step is the same step known to ballroom dancers as the international fox-trot. Except for the one-step, which is just that, most Texas dances are variations of a two-step, also called a half-step, which is simply a step-close-step. The Texas two-step is generally done with two long steps and a step-close-step to two-four time. Speeded up, it's a shuffle or double shuffle, but still a two-step.

As with other country/western dances, there are many versions of two-step across the United States, and there may be no one truly "correct" way to perform a particular dance. Even individual dance halls may have their own unique variations which they consider correct.

== QQS ==
The Deux Temp, also known as Two-Step, was described by Wilson in 1899. Her description can be read as step, together, change weight onto other foot.

Traditionally, Two-Step includes three steps: a quick step, a quick step, and then a slow step. In modern times, this is also known as Texas Polka. It can be danced to music with either a 2/4 or 4/4 time signature.

Older dance manuals specified the best effect is achieved when dancers have a smooth gliding motion in time to the music. For example, the 1939 book "Cowboy Dances" states that, "The real two-step should be smooth and beautiful to watch. But in a Western dance it is quite in kind to make it joyous and bouncy." Modern styles however continued with the smooth style and added a slight "lilt."

This same step pattern, step, close, step, with a timing of quick quick slow was given as the definition of Country-Western Two-Step in 1983.

This Two-Step was influenced by European and Mexican dances.

Dance positions include: an open position with the lead's right hand on the follower's left shoulder, a closed position with no space between the partners, and a closed overhand position in which the lead wraps their left forearm over the follower's right forearm and clasps their hand with the palm against the back of the follower's hand. A "side by side", "shoulder hold", "cape", or varsouviana position is also used.

== QQSS ==
Originally called the Texas Shuffle Step (or Foxtrot step), at some point this became better known as Texas Two-Step, in Texas, while just called, Two Step across the country which is now the most common dance with that name. Danced to music with 4/4 time signature, it consists of four steps with timing quick, quick, slow, slow, where the pattern of movement is often referred to as "Step-together, walk, walk." This Two-Step has been taught as early 1983.

The Two-Step can be danced over a fairly wide range of tempos, from 130 beats per minute (bpm) to over 200 bpm, with anything over 185 bpm generally considered advanced. The United Country Western Dance Council (UCWDC) lists competitive Two-Step at 180-210 bpm, while the Country Western Dance International (CWDI) lists competitive Two-Step at 160-192 bpm.

Basic two-step consists of two quick steps, followed by two slow steps (or alternately, two slow steps followed by two quick steps). Dancing may start with either the slow steps, or the quick steps, as the local custom dictates. However, patterns begin with the first quick and finish on the second slow.

The leader begins by stepping forward with his or her left foot. The follower begins by stepping backward with his or her right foot.

Formally, the quick steps are half strides, with one foot passing the other on each step while the slow steps are full strides. This allows dancers to move through space at the same rate while doing quicks and slows. However, many older dancers may close their feet on the second quick by bringing their feet together. This style has been passed down from generation to generation but does is not well suited for traveling turns and spins.

This style has roots with the first level of Foxtrot and basic two-step patterns are equivalent to those of many other progressive partner dances.

More advanced figures can be syncopated, following other patterns such as QQSQQS or QQQQSS (where Q represents a quick step and S a slow step).

== Variations ==
Other dance styles related to the two-step exist.

=== Shadow dancing ===
In shadow dancing, a variation found in some country/western venues, the follower stands in front of the lead and both face down the line of dance. The lead places their right hand over the follower's midsection or belt buckle, and the follower places their right hand over the lead's hand. The lead takes the follower's left hand in their own and holds it loosely out to the left in a position similar to the one used in standard two-stepping.

The count is the same as for the non-shadow two-step. The follower uses the same footwork as the lead in this case, beginning on the left foot. The lead propels the follower down the floor, with bodies touching or close together, as though the lead were the follower's shadow. The pair will normally turn and weave, and the lead may turn the follower before returning to standard position. The lead may also bring the follower behind him/her, giving the appearance of having swapped roles but with the lead still in control, and the lead may then bring the follower back in front.

The rhythm for the country shadow is not the same as that for the two-step. The shadow is done to a swing or shuffle step which has the same footwork as the two step, but the timing of the steps is different. In two-step, it's danced to a 4/4 time with one basic done in 3 counts (SSQQ) where each slow is 1 beat and each quick is half of a beat. The dancers end up on the same foot free each time so it takes 4 measures to get back to the first beat of the measure with the first dance step.

In shadow, the timing is more shuffle where the music is most often a 6/8 time. This is essentially a swing step beat. The shadow pattern is the same as the two step (2 slows and 2 quick steps), but it's not the same timing. It's more closely counted as "shuffle, step, step" where the shuffle is 3 counts of exactly the same timing. One could argue that the patter from the QQS is the same as the shuffle, but since it is done to a different music timing, that is incorrect. Many people count it as if it were a two step (SSQQ or QQSS), but that doesn't mean they don't alter the timing to match the music which then becomes a shuffle step.

== Other Two Steps ==
=== Double two-step ===
Double two-step, also referred to as triple two-step (and so designated by the UCWDC, which classifies it as a separate competitive dance style), is usually danced to slower music. The two slow steps are replaced by two sets of triple steps. By contrast, the two quick steps are now slow steps. One way to count double two-step is "1 and 2", "3 and 4", step, step. The count is the same as that of triple count East-coast swing.

The leader steps forward with their left foot to begin the dance. The follower steps backwards on their right. The partners embrace each other as in the basic two-step.

Double two-step is also referred to as "shuffle". Fort Worth Shuffle has the same pattern as double two-step, except that the first triple-step begins with the right foot.

=== Texas Two-Step or Progressive Double Two-Step ===
The two-step is a partner dance, consisting of a "leader" and a "follower." The leader determines the movements and patterns of the pair as they move around the dance floor. It is a progressive dance that proceeds counterclockwise around the floor. In the cases where they dance in the circle, the leader dances in the inside of the circle.

The Progressive Double Two Step is a type of country and western dance popularized in the Dallas/Fort Worth area. It typically consists of 6- and 8-count dance patterns. The basic 6-beat pattern consists of two shuffle steps (counted as "1 and 2", "3 and 4") with the follow being led by an arching one quarter semicircle clockwise then counterclockwise followed by two walking steps (counted "5, 6").

The partners generally begin in closed position with the leader facing the line of dance. The follower stands facing the leader. In a traditional "frame" the leader places their right hand over the partner's left shoulder. In the more contemporary styling, closed position is formed by placing the right hand under the follower's left arm, on their back. In either case, the leader holds the follower's right hand in their left hand at about shoulder height.

Other dance positions include:

- Sweetheart: side by side, the lead's right hand on the follower's right shoulder, and the left hands together near the left shoulder.
- Shadow: side by side, the follower's right hand on the back of their right hip, Lead's right hand placed in the Follower's, Lead's left hand at approximately hip level on the left side, Follower reaches their left hand across to place in the Lead's.
- Wrap (cuddle): side by side, follow's left arm crossing their body and holding lead's right hand. Follower's right arm crosses over their left and Lead places their left in it.
- Skater: side by side
- Promenade: both facing line of dance
- Reverse Promenade: both backing line of dance

=== Night Club Two Step ===
Nightclub two step is a partner dance initially developed by Buddy Schwimmer in the mid-1960s. The dance is also known as "Two Step" and was "one of the most popular forms of contemporary social dance" as a Disco Couples Dance in 1978. It is frequently danced to mid-tempo ballads in 4/4 time that have a characteristic quick-quick-slow beat. A classic example is the song Lady In Red.

=== San Francisco Style Two-Step ===
Another unique regional variant of the two-step comes from Northern California. According to San Francisco-based country dance club Sundance Saloon, the San Francisco style of two-step is distinguished by starting with two slow steps and then two quick (SSQQ), as opposed to QQSS, with partner turns taking place during the slow steps.
