= Bachata (dance) =

Social dance from the Dominican Republic

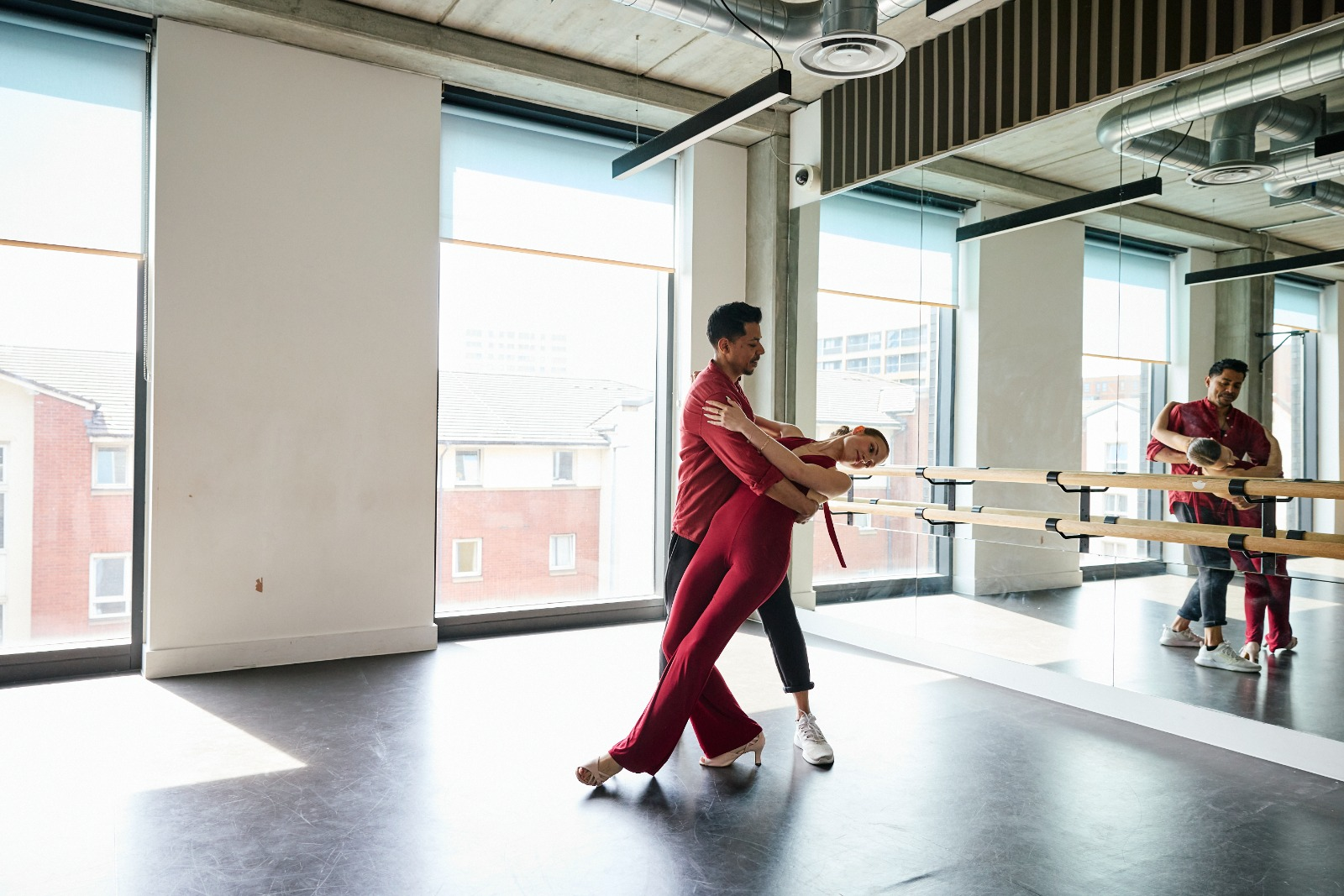
A couple dancing bachata (2025)

Bachata is a style of social dance from the Dominican Republic which is now danced all over the world. It is connected with bachata music.

== Description ==
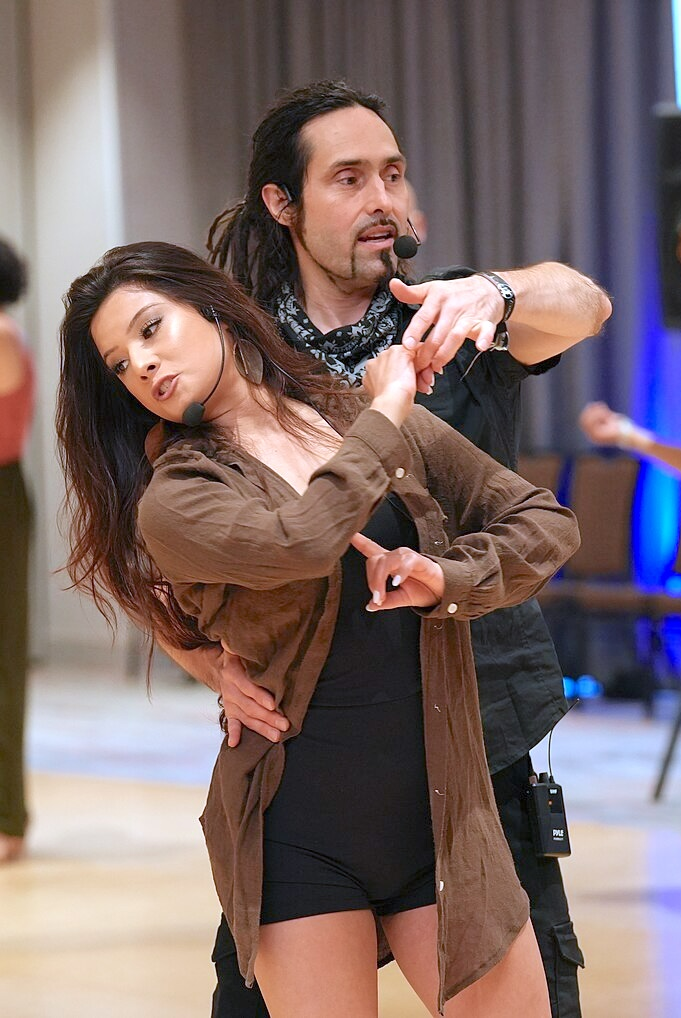
Bachata instructors at the California Dance Festival (2025)

Bachata is a social couple dance with a lead and follow that can be performed in open, semi-closed or closed position. The basic step involves an eight-count side-to-side movement, with many variations and styles that can be added. On counts 4 and 8, bachata includes an exaggerated hip check that gives it a characteristic look and differentiates it from bolero or son dancing. Counts 1 to 3 are moving to the lead's left, starting with the left foot, and counts 5 to 7 are moving to the lead's right, starting with the right foot. The hip check can be performed as a tap or slight lift of the foot for beginners.

The basic dance sequence can incorporate turns and hand movements from other ballroom dances like salsa or cha-cha.

== History ==
Often referred to in the West as "Dominican" bachata, the original social dance was created in the Dominican Republic during the 1960s and was danced only in closed position, like the bolero, often in a close embrace, often involving skin-to-skin belly-to-belly contact. Bachata basic steps are performed by moving within a small square (side, side, forward and then tap with your toes, then side, side, back and tap). This step was inspired by the bolero basic step, but evolved over time to include a tap and syncopations (steps in between the beats), helping dancers express the more dynamic music being commonly played. The hand placement can vary according to the position of the dances, which can range from very close to open to completely open.

In the late 20th century, Bachata gained wider international recognition. Today, Bachata is danced in the Caribbean and all over the world, and has been evolving for several decades. It is increasingly danced to faster music, adding more footwork, simple turns and rhythmic free-styling with alternation between close (romantic) and open position. Bachata is danced with soft hip movements and a tap or syncopation (1, 2, 3, tap/syncopation). It can also be danced with or without bouncing (moving the body up on the beats and down again in between the beats by adding slight spring to ones legs).

== The Four Styles ==
=== Dominican Bachata ===
Dominican bachata is a traditional social partner dance that originated in the Dominican Republic alongside bachata music during the mid-20th century. Influenced by rhythmic bolero and other Afro-Antillean musical traditions such as son, cha-cha-cha, and merengue, the dance is characterized by a simple eight-count step pattern, close partner connection, and expressive hip movements. It is commonly performed at family gatherings, community celebrations, and social events, where it plays an important role in Dominican cultural life.

=== Bachata Moderna ===
At some point in the late 1990s, dancers and dance schools in the Western world began using a side-to-side pattern instead of the box steps. The basic steps of this pattern move side to side, changing direction after every tap. Characteristics of this "early" dance school dance are the close connection between partners, soft hip movements, tap with a small "pop" of the hip on the 4th step (1, 2, 3, tap/hip), and not including many turns/figures. Most of the styling in this dance is from ballroom dance and show moves like dips are commonly used. This was the first novel dance to bachata music that was popularized by dance schools outside the Dominican Republic.

=== Bachata Sensual ===
The Sensual dance style was created in Cádiz, Andalusia, Spain, by Korke Escalona and Judith Cordero. Korke learned the basics of western "traditional" in 1998, but with no more information than the basic step (four steps to the side) and inspired by bachata music, he merged the traditional bachata dynamics with Brazilian zouk dances styles, developing his own dance style inspired by soft bachata songs of Juan Luis Guerra and natural "waving" movements in close position with a partner and by understanding how the leader (traditionally a man) could lead the body of the follower (traditionally a lady) to interpret the music. The result is a novel, independent dance form with strict principles of leading and following, with mostly circular movements and body waves similar to Brazilian Zouk, and with isolations and dips when the dancers feel the music calls for it.

=== Bachata Fusion ===
Bachata Fusion is where you take the base of bachata and mix it with another style of dance. There is no creator for this category as fusion means when you mix something with it. The fusion style would be where a bachata song is mainly bachata but has a hip-hop sound to it. This would be a bachata fusion song and one would dance in a fusion way - Bachata basic with hip-hop style movement.

== Sources ==
- Sellers, Julie A. (19 September 2014). Bachata and Dominican Identity. McFarland. pp. 26–27. ISBN 978-1-4766-1638-4.
- Sowell, Gary (18 November 2014). Afro Latin Rhythm Romance Dance. AuthorHouse. pp. 61–2. ISBN 978-1-4969-5397-1.
