= Graziano Di Prima =

Italian dancer and choreographer

- Born: 7 May 1994 (age 31); Riesi, Sicily, Italy
- Occupations: Dancer; Choreographer
- Known for: Strictly Come Dancing
- Spouse: Giada Lini

Graziano Di Prima (born 7 May 1994) is an Italian dancer and choreographer. Between 2018 and 2023, Di Prima was a professional dancer on the BBC's Strictly Come Dancing.

== Career ==
Di Prima was born in Sicily.

He toured with Burn the Floor, UK, in 2021, alongside other professional dancers, and the Strictly Come Dancing the Professionals Live Tour in 2022.

== Strictly Come Dancing ==
In 2018, the BBC announced that Di Prima would join the cast of professional dancers on the British television show Strictly Come Dancing. He was demoted the following year due to his height, as he personally announced that he was not getting a celebrity partner.

Di Prima has also appeared on a number of episodes of BBC Two's Strictly Come Dancing: It Takes Two with Zoë Ball. Di Prima is the current Guinness World Record holder for the most Botafogo steps, performing 90 steps in 30 seconds in a challenge held in December 2019. This record was achieved on It Takes Two with supervision by Guinness World Records.

Di Prima danced with singer Anne-Marie for the 2021 Christmas special, and won. He also participated in the 2023 Christmas special with news presenter Sally Nugent, and finished as a runner-up.

In July 2024, despite initially being confirmed to return for the twenty-second series, it was later announced that Di Prima would not be returning to the show, following allegations of misconduct against him. In a statement, Di Prima said that he "deeply regret[ted]" his actions that led to his departure from the show, which he later said included kicking his final celebrity partner Zara McDermott.

Series	Partner	Place	Average Score
16	Vick Hope	12th	24.2
19	Judi Love	10th	24.4
20	Kym Marsh	6th	31.1
21	Zara McDermott	10th	24.7

Highest and Lowest Scoring Per Dance

Dance	Partner	Highest	Partner	Lowest
American Smooth	Kym Marsh	31	Judi Love	24
Argentine Tango	Kym Marsh	37		
Cha-cha-cha	Kym Marsh	34	Zara McDermott	19
Charleston	Kym Marsh	33	Judi Love	24
Couple's Choice				
Foxtrot				
Jive	Kym Marsh	23	Vick Hope	18
Paso Doble	Kym Marsh	33	Zara McDermott	25
Quickstep	Vick Hope	29	Zara McDermott	23
Rumba	Kym Marsh	34		
Salsa	Vick Hope	27		
Samba	Kym Marsh	32	Judi Love	25
Showdance				
Tango				
Viennese Waltz	Zara McDermott	28	Kym Marsh	27
Waltz	Vick Hope	27	Judi Love	24

=== Series 16 ===
Di Prima's first celebrity partner was radio DJ Vick Hope.

Week №	Dance / Song	Judges' scores				Score	Result
Week №	Dance / Song	Horwood	Bussell	Ballas	Tonioli	Score	Result
1	Jive / "Feel It Still"	3	5	4	6	18	No Elimination
2	Waltz / "Somewhere"	7	7	6	7	27	Safe
3	Salsa / "Take A Chance on Me"	6	7	7	7	27	Safe
4	Quickstep / "You Can't Hurry Love"	7	7	7	8	29	Safe
5	Cha-Cha-Cha / "More Than Friends"	4	6	4	6*	20	Eliminated

- Score awarded by guest judge Alfonso Ribiero.

=== Series 19 ===
Di Prima's second celebrity partner was comedian & Loose Women panellist Judi Love.

Week №	Dance / Song	Judges' scores				Score	Result
Week №	Dance / Song	Horwood	Mabuse	Ballas	Du Beke	Score	Result
1	American Smooth / "Chain of Fools"	6	6	6	6	24	No Elimination
2	Samba / "Get Busy"	6	7	6	6	25	Safe
3	Charleston / "When You're Good to Mama"	4	7	7	6	24	Bottom two
4	Waltz / "Hero"	4	6	7	7	24	Bottom two
5	Cha-Cha-Cha / "Physical"	–	–	–	–	–	Given bye
6	Cha-Cha-Cha / "Physical"	4	7	7	7	25	Eliminated

=== Series 20 ===
Di Prima's third celebrity partner was actress & Morning Live presenter Kym Marsh.

Week №	Dance / Song	Judges' scores				Score	Result
Week №	Dance / Song	Horwood	Mabuse	Ballas	Du Beke	Score	Result
1	Jive / "Yes"	4	6	6	7	23	No Elimination
2	Viennese Waltz / "Runaway"	6	7	7	7	27	Safe
3	Charleston / "If My Friends Could See Me Now"	7	9	8	9	33	Safe
4	Samba / "Volare"	7	8	8	9	32	Bottom two
5	Quickstep / "Ballroom Blitz"	7	7	6	7	27	Safe
6	Rumba / "Frozen"	8	8	9	9	34	Safe
7	Argentine tango / "Assassin's Tango"	9	9	9	10	37	Safe
8	American Smooth / "Chasing Cars"	8	7	8	8	31	Safe
9	Paso Doble / "Only Girl (In the World)"/"We Found Love"	8	8	8	9	33	Safe
10	Couple's Choice / "I Feel for You"	–	–	–	–	–	Given bye
11	Cha-cha-cha / "Fame"	8	9	9	8	34	Eliminated

=== Series 21 ===
Di Prima's fourth celebrity partner was media personality and television presenter Zara McDermott.

Week №	Dance / Song	Judges' scores				Score	Result
Week №	Dance / Song	Horwood	Mabuse	Ballas	Du Beke	Score	Result
1	Cha-cha-cha / "Crush"	3	6	5	5	19	No Elimination
2	Quickstep / "Anyone for You (Tiger Lily)"	6	6	5	6	23	Safe
3	Paso Doble / "The Puss Suite"	6	6	6	7	25	Bottom two
4	Viennese waltz / "You Don't Have to Say You Love Me"	7	7	7	7	28	Safe
5	American Smooth / "Can't Fight the Moonlight"	7	7	7	7	28	Bottom two
6	Charleston / "Jeepers Creepers"	6	6	6	7	25	Eliminated
