= Counter promenade position =

Dance position

The counter promenade position (abbreviated as CPP in dance diagrams) is a dance position in ballroom and other dances. It is described differently in various dance categories, but essentially it is the opposite of the promenade position.

== Ballroom ==
In ballroom dances their common trait is that when in counter promenade position, the dance couple moves (or intends to move) essentially sidewise to the leader's right while the bodies form a V-shape, with leader's left and follower's right sides are closer than the leader's right and follower's left. Steps of both partners are basically sidewise or diagonally forward with respect to their bodies, in the direction of the open end of the "V". Normally the dancers look in the direction of the intended movement.

The closed CPP is when the couple is basically in the closed position used in Standard and Smooth dances (Waltz, Foxtrot, etc.).

The open CPP, either in double or single handhold, is an open position used in Latin and Rhythm dances (Rumba, Cha-Cha, etc.) and as open position is American Smooth dances.

=== Figures that involve CPP ===
- Progressive Chasse to Right (Waltz, Quickstep, Paso Doble)
- Tipple Chasse to Right (Quickstep)
- Promenade and Counter Promenade (Paso Doble)
- Traveling Spins from Counter Promenade Position (Paso Doble)
- Bota Fogos to Promenade and Counter Promenade (Samba)
- Promenade and Counter Promenade Runs (Samba, American Style Foxtrot, Waltz and Peabody)
- Travelling locks from CPP (Samba)
- Counter Promenade spins (Samba)
- Walks in CPP (Rumba)
- Spanish Line from CPP (paso Doble)
