= Botafogo (dance move) =

Botafogo, also sometimes spelt as Bota-fogo or Bota Fogo, is a dance step in Samba. Depending on relative positions and handholds, there are several versions of Botafogos while the basic footwork technique is the same. The name comes from Botafogo place in Rio de Janeiro, Brazil.

A generic Botafogo step pattern may start from either foot, either forward or backward, and its three steps are counted as "1..a2". During the dance the Botafogos are usually repeated several times, from alternating feet.

A sample footwork is as follows:

- Start facing, e.g., diagonally to the wall.
- On "1" step forward with the left foot slightly diagonally across the body (i.e., step in CBMP)
- On "a" step sideways with partial weight transfer. During this and the next steps, make a quarter turn to the left.
- On "2" replace the full weight onto the left foot.
- End the figure facing diagonally to the center.

The ballroom Samba has the following named variations of Botafogo:

- Travelling Botafogos Forward
- Travelling Botafogos Back
- Criss Cross Botafogos
- Shadow Botafogos
- Contra Botafogos
- Botafogos to PP and CPP (to promenade position and counter promenade position)

== TV show references ==
Botafogo dance moves are often mentioned various times on the British television show BBC One's Strictly Come Dancing, when the dancers perform various Latin dances. They were also used on the professional dancers' challenge during the Strictly Come Dancing: It Takes Two (a companion show to the main Strictly Come Dancing TV show) 2011 season. The dancers were challenged to perform the most botafogos in 30 seconds to set a new Guinness World Records. The winner was Artem Chigvintsev with 79 botafogos. Again it was featured on Strictly Come Dancing: It Takes Two in 2019 with Graziano Di Prima winning with a record 90 botafogos.
