= Tap dance technique =

Overview of tap dance steps

Tap dance makes frequent use of syncopation. Tap dance choreographies typically start on the eighth beat, or between the eighth and the first count.

== Styles ==
Tap was formed from other types of dancing, such as flamenco, ballet, jazz and contemporary clogging. Hoofers are tap dancers who dance only with their feet, making a louder, more grounded sound. This kind of tap dancing is also called "rhythm tap".

Another aspect of tap dancing is improvisation. This can either be done with music and follow the beats provided or without musical accompaniment, otherwise known as a cappella dancing. Tap dancers often work with musicians to weave rhythm and musical composition, usually jazz music, to create improvisation. Improv jams take place in communities around the world where tap dancers and musicians exchange and experiment with improv.

== Steps ==
There is no universal terminology for tap techniques and steps. The following includes descriptions of steps that are well known, although the names may vary.

Tap Dance Technique

=== Steps with one sound ===
- tap: tap the ball or pad of the foot against the floor, use your ankle not your whole leg.
- heel tap: strike the heel of the foot on the floor and release it immediately.
- step: place the ball of the foot on the floor with a change of weight.
- touch: place the ball of the foot on the floor without change of weight.
- stamp: place the flat foot on the floor with a change of weight. Foot stays on floor.
- stomp: place the flat foot on the floor, lift foot off floor (no change of weight).
- (heel) dig: place the heel on the floor, keeping the ball off the floor (with or without change of weight).
- heel (drop): standing on the balls of one or both feet, "drop" the heel on the floor, with or without change of weight.
- ball (drop):standing on the heels of one or both feet, "drop" the ball on the floor, with or without change of weight.
- toe: hit the floor with the tip of the foot, usually behind the other foot, without change of weight.
- toe stand: stand on one or both tips of the feet. This requires fairly stiff tap shoes.
- hop: standing on one foot, jump up and land on the same foot.
- leap: standing on one foot, jump up and land on the other foot.
- jump: standing on one or both feet, jump up and land on both feet.
- brush: standing on one leg sweep the opposite leg forward or backward from the hip striking the ball of the foot. (Backward aka "spank")
- scuff: as a brush, but striking the floor with the heel instead of the ball of the foot,
- chug: standing on one foot (flat or ball) with weight, move forward same foot into stamp.
- flam:

=== Steps with two sounds ===
- ball heel: strike the ball of the foot on the floor and drop your heel. (aka "step heel")
- shuffle: combine two brushes, one forward and one backward. A faster shuffle can be achieved by making smaller movements that are closer to the body. There are actually many different ways to perform a shuffle. Broadway-style shuffles use knee movement to swing the foot into a shuffle. Hoofers generally execute a shuffle from movement in the upper leg and hip. While a faster shuffle may seem to come from the ankle, it is actually much easier to get speed and clarity from the hip, which is why this method is preferred. (spoken "shuf-fle" to indicate two sounds)
- scuffle or paddle: combine a scuff with a backward brush. (spoken "scuf-fle" to indicate two sounds)
- flap: brush forward and a step (which is striking the ball of the foot on the floor with a change of weight; similar to a walking step, only done on the ball of the foot—the heel does not touch the floor). The flap is often counted as "& 1." It is similar to the shuffle, but instead of brushing the ball back after the brush forward, the dancer steps (i.e. brush step instead of brush brush, as in a shuffle). (spoken "fe-lap" to indicate two sounds)
- slap: brush forward and a touch, similar to the flap but without change of weight. (spoken "se-lap" to indicate two sounds)
- pickup: placing the heel of the foot on the ground and slapping the ball of the foot where the heel was in a picking up motion.
- pullback: standing on the balls of one or both feet, jump up, hitting the ground with the ball(s) of the foot/feet on the way up, and land on the same foot (or again both feet), slapping your feet while in the air and landing on the foot/feet. Notable variations are single pullback (two sounds), double pullback (four sounds), alternating pullback, and other variations including other steps.
- (two count) riff: standing on one leg, swing the other leg down, first hitting the ground with the ball of the foot, then with the heel.
- ball change: two steps on alternating feet. The first step does not get full weight.
- crawl: movement of one foot to one side with two sounds, e.g. heel - ball or ball - heel.

=== Steps with three sounds ===
- riffle: a riff combined with a backward brush.
- ripple: using only the toe tap of one foot, striking with the outer edge of the tap, followed by the inner edge, followed by the ball of the foot.
- slurp: one foot is placed on the floor with or without weight, first hitting with the ball, then with the heel, then again with the ball. This step is usually very fast with precision.
- three beat shuffle:the same movement as a two beat shuffle except with a heel
- (three count) riff: starting with a two count riff, followed by a heel dig of the now forward moving legs.
- press cramp roll: Weight is and basically remains on the ball of one foot at the end of any previous step, touch-heel with the other foot (no weight transfer), followed by the heel of the first foot.

=== Steps with four sounds ===
- cramp roll: Steps and heel drops can be combined to make a cramp roll which produces a rolling sound like a horse gallop or a drum roll. It is performed by doing two steps (right then left or vice versa), followed by two heel drops (right then left or vice versa), releasing the first heel immediately upon completion. In other words, it is performed as "ball (R) ball (L) heel (R) heel (L)" and is often counted as "1 and a 2." It may be preceded by a brush (counted as "& 1 & a 2" and known as a flap cramp roll or 5-cramp roll) or done double time, known as a "bite cramproll" and counted as "a & a 1.". I performed as "ball (R) ball (L) heel (L) heel (R)" it is called "around the world" or "C-shaped".
- paradiddle: a scuffle, followed by step heel, all on the same foot. (aka "paddle-and-roll")
- (four count) riff: starting with a three count riff, followed by a ball of the forward moving legs including weight transfer. (aka "riff walk"). Can be extended to a 5-sound riff walk by inserting a heel on the other foot between the riff and the dig-ball. Further extensions allow for 6-sound and 7-sound riffs.
- Four beat shuffle: a shuffle with four beats, with relaxed movement of the foot.
- Irish: Named for its resemblance to Irish jigs. A shuffle followed by a hop on the standing foot, then the working foot crosses either in front or in back.

All tap dancing steps are a combination of simple movements that build upon each other. Most movements, simple and complex, include "taps", "drops", "brushes" (including shuffles and flaps), and "steps". For example, "shuffle ball change" is a shuffle followed by a ball change. Tap dancing steps may be learned and mastered by children and adults alike and are a good way to express/learn rhythm, dance, and percussion.

== See also ==
- Maxie Ford
- Time step
