= Feather step =

The feather or feather step is a dance figure in the International Style foxtrot. Depending on a syllabus, it consists of three or four steps (man stepping basically forward), with the third step (right foot) done outside the lady (lady on the right side) with a slight turn in the body position to the right.

The step was first introduced in 1920 by G. K. Anderson.

The Imperial Society of Teachers of Dancing (ISTD) syllabus considers the fourth step that aligns the man with the lady into a normal dance position to be part of the feather step variation, while the International Dance Teachers Association (IDTA) syllabus does not.

The pattern and especially its distinctive part (steps 2 and 3) gave rise to several variations:

- Curved feather
- Overturned feather
- Back feather
- Hover feather
- Endings of more complex variations:
  - Feather finish (the first step is taken back; called continuity finish in American Style)
  - Feather ending (the first step is taken in promenade position)
