= Strictly Come Dancing: It Takes Two =

Companion weeknight show on BBC Two

- Also known as: Strictly: It Takes Two; It Takes Two
- Developed by: BBC Studios
- Presented by: Claudia Winkleman (2004–2010); Zoe Ball (2011–2020); Rylan Clark (2019–2022); Janette Manrara (2021–2025); Fleur East (2023–2025); Ellie Taylor (2026–present)
- Starring: Ian Waite; Vicky Gill; Gethin Jones (Note: Jones has guest presented the show a number of times; on 15–16 November 2017 and 2–3 October 2019, when Ball was unwell and on 12, 13, 19 and 20 November 2020 when Clark was self isolating.); Joanne Clifton; Kevin Clifton; Tasha Ghouri
- Composers: Dan McGrath; Josh Phillips
- Country of origin: United Kingdom
- Original language: English
- No. of series: 24
- No. of episodes: 1,062

Production
- Production locations: Riverside Studios (2021); Elstree Studios (2020, 2022–); h Studio (2004–2007, 2018–2019); Television Centre (2008–2012, 2017); The London Studios (2013–2016)
- Camera setup: Multi-camera
- Running time: 30 minutes

Original release
- Network: BBC Two
- Release: 25 October 2004 – present

Related
- Strictly Come Dancing: On Three; Strictly Come Dancing

Strictly Come Dancing: It Takes Two (also known as Strictly: It Takes Two or simply It Takes Two) is a British television programme, the companion show to the BBC One programme Strictly Come Dancing. It premiered on 25 October 2004, and it is broadcast from Monday to Friday during the run of the main show on BBC Two at 6:30 pm.

== History ==
It Takes Two premiered during the second series of the main show in Autumn 2004, replacing the companion show to the first series, Strictly Come Dancing: On Three, which had been broadcast on the digital channel BBC Three and hosted by Justin Lee Collins. Before the 2010 series, BBC Two Scotland did not broadcast the show on Thursdays, when locally produced Gaelic language programming aired in the slot instead, though during the 2008 and 2009 series the Thursday night show was carried as an alternative digital stream via BBC Red Button.

The show was originally hosted by Claudia Winkleman until 2010. In 2011, Zoe Ball replaced Winkleman as host. On 18 April 2019, it was announced that Rylan Clark would be joining the show as a co-host alongside Ball. On 17 May 2021, Ball revealed that she would be leaving the show after ten years. On 10 June 2021, it was announced on The One Show, that Janette Manrara would be replacing Ball, hosting alongside Clark. On 12 April 2023, it was announced that Clark would be leaving the show after four years. Fleur East was announced as his replacement in June 2023. In August 2026, the BBC announced that Ellie Taylor would take over the hosting role in a new version of the show, replacing Manrara and East.

== Format ==
The programme features interviews and training footage of the couples competing in the main Saturday night show, opinions from the judges on the previous Saturday show and the training footage for the next, and interviews with celebrities who have been watching the show. The show features half-hour episodes each Monday to Friday, with an extended one-hour episode for the final episode of the series. During the show, the presenters are joined each week by the contestants, professionals, judges and celebrity panellists.

== Presenters scheduling ==
For the 2019 series, it was announced that Rylan Clark would join the programme as a co-host. He would present on Mondays and Tuesdays, interviewing both the eliminated pair, and the other pair in the dance-off. Zoe Ball would then present the Wednesday and Thursday shows with Ian Waite and Vicky Gill. Clark and Ball co-presented on Friday, with Gethin Jones remaining as a roving reporter.

This schedule was changed in 2020, with Ball presenting on Mondays, Tuesdays and Wednesdays, and Clark presenting on Thursdays and Fridays. In the 2021 series, with Manrara replacing Ball, Clark was presenting on Mondays, Tuesdays and Fridays while Manrara did so on Wednesdays and Thursdays. In 2023, Fleur East replaced Clark and began hosting Monday and Tuesdays with Manrara continuing to host Wednesday and Thursday. The pair alternated duties on a Friday. In 2026, Ellie Taylor took over as full time presenter.

In 2025, Tasha Ghouri joined the team as a roving reporter, but in 2026 was replaced by Abi Clarke.

== Current segments ==
=== Studio segments ===
- Puttin' on the Glitz: On Thursday, the presenter chats with the show's head dress designer Vicky Gill about the costumes that the couples will be wearing that week.
- Friday Panel: On Friday, three or more celebrity fans of the show review music, costumes and training room footage of the celebrities ahead of the Saturday Show. From 2019 to 2025, they also predicted which couple will be eliminated that week.

=== Other recurring segments ===
- Strictly Pro Challenge

The professional dancers put various different dance techniques to the test against one another in a yearly competition.

| Year | Winner | Dance Step | Number achieved |
|---|---|---|---|
| 2011 | Artem Chigvintsev | Botafogos | 79 |
| 2012 | Flavia Cacace | Kick ball change | 76 |
| 2013 | Kevin Clifton | Drunken sailors | 77 |
| 2014 | Karen Hauer and Aljaž Skorjanec | New Yorkers | 39 |
| 2016 | Giovanni Pernice | Jive kicks and flicks | 55 |
| 2017 | Giovanni Pernice | Charleston swivels | 24 |
| 2018 | Oti Mabuse | Toe-heel swivels | 48 |
| 2019 | Graziano Di Prima | Botafogos | 90 |
| 2020 | Nadiya Bychkova | Fleckerls | 25 |
| 2021 | Nadiya Bychkova | Patacakes | 38 |
| 2022 | Amy Dowden | Back Charleston kick-steps | 19 |
| 2023 | Lauren Oakley | Quickstep pendulums | 15 |
| 2024 | Kai Widdrington | Cha-cha-cha time steps | 15 |
| 2025 | Neil Jones | Samba Whisks | 58 |

- Global Glitterballs: A look into the various different versions of Strictly Come Dancing from across the globe.
- Strictly CV: One of Strictly Come Dancing's cast members talks through their time on the show, including all of their highlights. Previous guests have included Oti Mabuse, Anton du Beke and Craig Revel Horwood.
- Strictly Pro Down: The professional dancers compete against each other in a series of fun challenges including building the largest marshmallow and stick house and painting with a very long paintbrush. The other pros all attempt to guess who will win.

== Previous segments ==
- Len's Masterclass: Head judge Len Goodman had a weekly spot with Claudia Winkleman, in which he demonstrated the dances to be performed on the following Saturday. This was discontinued when Ball replaced Winkleman as the show's presenter.
- Stat Man: Russell Grant appeared on the 2012 series with a guide to the numbers of winners of Strictly.
- Dance Mat Challenge: The Pro-Dancers were challenged to get on an electronic dance mat and try to top a leaderboard.

In 2013, a new feature was shown, where dancer Natalie Lowe was set a challenge to teach a normal couple, known only as Gordon and Mel from Southampton, how to dance ahead of their wedding.

In 2014, Robin Windsor was set a challenge to teach the teachers of a school to dance for a performance for the school.

A live phone-in segment featured during the autumn 2004 series of the main show, where viewers could speak to the contestants on air.

- Janette and Melvin's Cha Cha Chart Show: Professional dancer Janette Manrara and her 2016 partner Melvin Odoom host a chart-based countdown of various past performances and iconic Strictly moments.
- Ore's Overview: Former champion Ore Oduba gives his say on all the couple's journeys so far.
- Booth of Truth: The Strictly professional dancers each enter a booth and are individually asked questions the other pros' personal habits.
- Ballroom Bingo: Professional dancer Anton du Beke asks the pro dancers questions about the other pro dancers.
- Ballas Breakdown: Head judge Shirley Ballas explains and demonstrates steps from the dances.
- Dance Card: Zoe Ball chooses a dance for head judge Shirley to demonstrate.
- Craig's Rev-alations: Every Monday, Judge Craig Revel Horwood reviewed the celebrities previous choreography, performances and training room footage. Though this segment was removed, the chats with Horwood returned for the 2018 series, with him making regular appearances on the Friday show.
- Dance Master: Every Tuesday, renowned dance coach Carmen teaches Rylan the basic steps of one of the dances. As well as this, she explains the background and history of the different styles.
- Waite's Warm-Up: Every Wednesday (and Thursday earlier in the series), Ian Waite reviewed training room footage of the couples so far as they practiced their dances and suggested areas they needed to make improvements.
- It Takes Who: The pros play a game of guess who about each other, revealing some surprising, little-known secrets.
- Tunes on Tuesday: On Tuesday, there was usually a sneak peek of some of the songs.
- Clifton's Choreography Corner: Every Tuesday (and Monday earlier in the series), a former professional dancer on Strictly Come Dancing reviews the previous week's choreography. They also demonstrate the moves in a mini-segment called "Demo Time". Following Karen Hardy's departure in 2017, various former professionals co-hosted, including Camilla Sacre-Dallerup, Joanne Clifton, Natalie Lowe, Erin Boag, Kevin Clifton and Vincent Simone. In 2022, Joanne Clifton became permanent host, appearing every week. In the 2023 series, Joanne's brother Kevin guest hosted in her place on several episodes.
- Manrara's Masterclass: Every Wednesday, Janette is joined by a former celebrity contestant to teach viewers (and the It Takes Two crew) some steps from one of the dances on Strictly. So far, celebrity guests have included Ashley Roberts, Ranj Singh and Kimberly Walsh. Viewers are invited to send in clips of them attempting the steps to be shown at the start of the following week's masterclass.

== Series overview ==
| Series | Start date | End date | Presenters | | No. of weeks | Location(s) |
|---|---|---|---|---|---|---|
| 2 | 25 October 2004 | 10 December 2004 | Claudia Winkleman | —N/a | 7 | h Studio |
| 3 | 17 October 2005 | 16 December 2005 | Claudia Winkleman | —N/a | 9 | h Studio |
| 4 | 7 October 2006 | 22 December 2006 | Claudia Winkleman | —N/a | 12 | h Studio |
| 5 | 8 October 2007 | 21 December 2007 | Claudia Winkleman | —N/a | 12 | h Studio |
| 6 | 22 September 2008 | 19 December 2008 | Claudia Winkleman | —N/a | 13 | TC11, BBC Television Centre |
| 7 | 20 September 2009 | 18 December 2009 | Claudia Winkleman | —N/a | 13 | TC11, BBC Television Centre |
| 8 | 4 October 2010 | 17 December 2010 | Claudia Winkleman | —N/a | 11 | TC11, BBC Television Centre |
| 9 | 3 October 2011 | 16 December 2011 (Note: The final episode of Series 8 was broadcast live from Blackpool Tower Ballroom on Friday 16 December 2011) | Zoe Ball | —N/a | 11 | TC11, BBC Television Centre |
| 10 | 8 October 2012 | 21 December 2012 | Zoe Ball | —N/a | 11 | TC3, BBC Television Centre |
| 11 | 29 September 2013 | 20 December 2013 | Zoe Ball | —N/a | 12 | Studio 7, The London Studios |
| 12 | 28 September 2014 | 19 December 2014 | Zoe Ball | —N/a | 12 | Studio 7, The London Studios |
| 13 | 27 September 2015 | 18 December 2015 | Zoe Ball | —N/a | 12 | Studio 7, The London Studios |
| 14 | 26 September 2016 | 16 December 2016 | Zoe Ball | —N/a | 12 | Studio 7, The London Studios |
| 15 | 25 September 2017 | 15 December 2017 | Zoe Ball | —N/a | 12 | TC2, Television Centre |
| 16 | 24 September 2018 | 14 December 2018 | Zoe Ball | —N/a | 12 | h Studio |
| 17 | 23 September 2019 | 13 December 2019 | Zoe Ball | Rylan Clark | 12 | h Studio |
| 18 | 26 October 2020 | 18 December 2020 | Zoe Ball | Rylan Clark | 8 | Stage 6, Elstree Studios |
| 19 | 27 September 2021 | 17 December 2021 | Janette Manrara | Rylan Clark | 12 | Studio 2, Riverside Studios |
| 20 | 26 September 2022 | 16 December 2022 | Janette Manrara | Rylan Clark | 12 | Stage 6, Elstree Studios |
| 21 | 25 September 2023 | 15 December 2023 | Janette Manrara | Fleur East | 12 | Stage 6, Elstree Studios |
| 22 | 23 September 2024 | 13 December 2024 | Janette Manrara | Fleur East | 12 | Stage 6, Elstree Studios |
| 23 | 29 September 2025 | 19 December 2025 | Janette Manrara | Fleur East | 12 | Stage 6, Elstree Studios |
| 24 | 28 September 2026 | 18 December 2026 | Ellie Taylor | —N/a | 12 | Stage 6, Elstree Studios |

=== Presenters ===
Main cast members
| Presenters | Main series accompanied | | | | | | | | | | | | | | | | | | | | | | | |
| Presenters | 1 | 2 | 3 | 4 | 5 | 6 | 7 | 8 | 9 | 10 | 11 | 12 | 13 | 14 | 15 | 16 | 17 | 18 | 19 | 20 | 21 | 22 | 23 | 24 |
|---|---|---|---|---|---|---|---|---|---|---|---|---|---|---|---|---|---|---|---|---|---|---|---|---|
| Justin Lee Collins | | | | | | | | | | | | | | | | | | | | | | | | |
| Claudia Winkleman | | Main | Main | Main | Main | Main | Main | Main | | | | Guest | | Guest | Guest | Guest | Guest | Guest | Guest | Guest | | | | |
| Zoe Ball | | | Guest | Guest | Guest | | | Guest | Main | Main | Main | Main | Main | Main | Main | Main | Main | Main | | | | | | |
| Rylan Clark | | | | | | | | | | | | | | | | | Main | Main | Main | Main | | | | |
| Janette Manrara | | | | | | | | | | Guest | Guest | Guest | Guest | Guest | Guest | Guest | Guest | Guest | Main | Main | Main | Main | Main | |
| Fleur East | | | | | | | | | | | | | | | | | | | | Guest | Main | Main | Main | |
| Ellie Taylor | | | | | | | | | | | | | | | | | | | | Guest | | | | Main |

== Studio ==
The show has been presented from many venues. In 2017, the programme returned to the newly refurbished Studio TC2 at the Television Centre complex in West London. For the 2018 series, the show was broadcast from The Hospital Club TV Studio in London's Covent Garden, due to ITV Daytime programmes now occupying the Television Centre studios. In 2020, The show moved to Stage 6 at Elstree Studios, the first time It Takes Two has been broadcast from the same studio complex as the main show since 2012.

== Ratings ==
The show averages between two and three million viewers each evening and is regularly the most watched show of the day on BBC Two.
