= Hustle (dance) =

Type of dance

The Hustle is a catch-all name for some disco dances which were extremely popular in the 1970s. In the late 1970s, Bump, Hustle, Watergate and Spank were popular. It mostly refers to the unique partner dance done in nightclubs to disco music. Hustle has steps in common with Mambo and Salsa and basic steps are somewhat similar to Euro dance style Discofox, which emerged at about the same time and is more familiar in various European countries. Modern partner hustle is sometimes referred to as New York hustle, however, its original name is the Latin hustle.

A source for research on the origins of the Hustle is a book written by Willie Estrada, one of the original pioneers of the Latin Hustle, The Dancing Gangsters of the South Bronx (Rise of the Latin Hustle).

== History ==
=== Latin Strut ===
Joe Bataan recorded a song called "Latin Strut" after visiting a Bronx Club called the "310 1/2" in 1973 and seeing the first version of a 6-step dance called "The Hustle." This new Latin rhythmic sound helped young Latino Teenagers develop a faster more robust version of the original slower paced six-step dance which was also a bit robotic. However, with the introduction of songs with faster rhythmic tempos young hustle dancers started doing the dance with fancier gyrations which is when it became known as the Latin Hustle. Other variations of the Hustle would soon be developed by the Black and White communities who also helped spread the Hustle throughout New York City, and eventually the world.

=== James Brown and Fatback ===
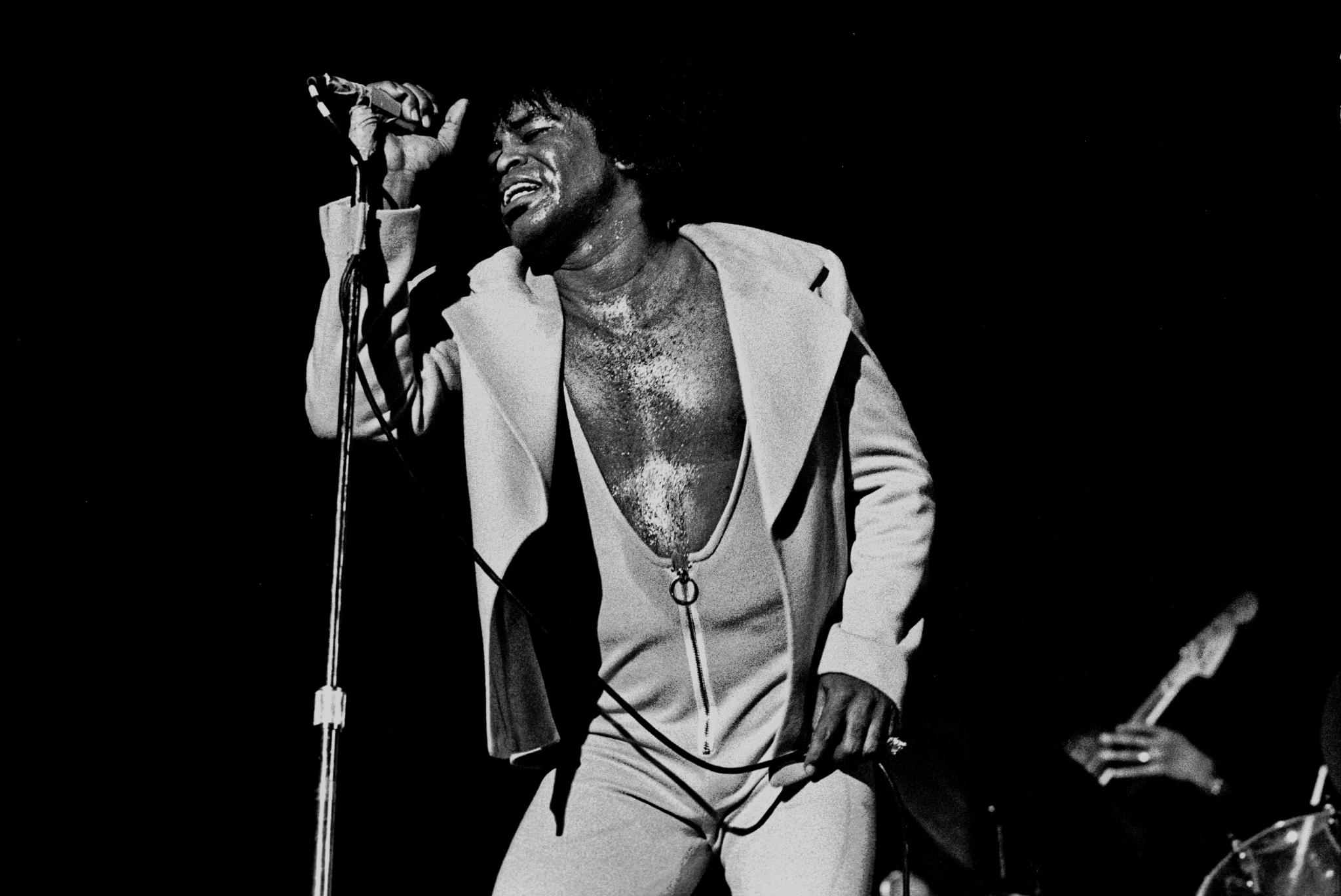
James Brown

The original early hustle was a 5-step count with no turns, created by Puerto Rican teenagers in late 1972 as a direct result of Puerto Rican elders objecting to young teenagers doing a grinding slow dance known as the 500. Created in the South Bronx among Puerto Rican teens it was originally done at house parties, hooky gigs, and basements club dances in the South Bronx. It became known as "Spanish hustle"; from 1975 to 1976, funk band the Fatback Band made a song with that name. It was also known as the "Latin hustle"; and was a 6 step count to the beat of the music. And James Brown released Everybody's Doin' the Hustle & Dead on the Double Bump album in 1975. Same year The JB's released Hustle with Speed album. Around 1976 it became known as the "New York hustle". Later, known as just "the hustle", when the dance became commercialized after the release of Saturday Night Fever in 1977. The early Latin hustle Pioneers were Willie "Marine Boy" Estrada and many other members. Some of them were members of a gang called the Imperial Bachelors, who used the Latin hustle as a way to bring peace into a violent South Bronx. They hosted hustle parties at St. Mary's Recreation Center on 145th St. and St. Ann's Ave, in 1974. Those parties ended in October 1974. However, it was the venue that produced some of the best hustle dancers in New York City, who would help spread the dance in nightclubs throughout New York City in late 1974.

In 1975 music business entrepreneur, Marty Angelo created the first all hustle dance television show entitled, Disco Step-by-Step. Each one-hour show featured top hustle dancers and two 10-minute instructional segments that allowed viewers to learn how to hustle dance in the privacy of their own living rooms. One of the first shows featured a young Billy Fajardo and the Disco Dance Dimensions. Many of the show's video clips can be found on YouTube. Marty Angelo also created the Hustle Hall of Fame online list of dancers in 2000 that he eventually turned over to Ron Bess and Mark James.

=== Van McCoy's song ===
The original Latin Hustle started being developed in late 1972 by Puerto Rican Teenagers in the South Bronx and by 1974 was being done all over New York and the Tri-State area, and by 1976 became an International Dance Sensation. Van McCoy and the Soul City Symphony's song "The Hustle" became a hit in 1975, reaching the #1 spot on both the Billboard Hot 100 and Hot Soul Singles charts. Tipped off by DJ David Todd, McCoy sent his partner Charlie Kipps Jr.to the Adam's Apple discotheque in New York City's East Side. And "The Hustle" reached the top of the Billboard Pop Singles chart the week ending July 26, 1975. Van McCoy with The Stylistics got disco songs such as "Disco Baby", "Can't Give You Anything", "Love is the Answer" and "Funky Weekend". Van McCoy and Charlie Kipps produced David Ruffin also.

=== Depiction in Saturday Night Fever ===
The 1977 disco movie Saturday Night Fever (the sound track includes Tavares, Yvonne Elliman, Bee Gees, Kool & the Gang, KC & the Sunshine Band, The Trammps) showed both the line and partner forms of hustle, as well as a dance referred to as the "tango hustle" (invented for that film by Deney Terrio, according to the DVD commentary). Although the popularity of the movie faded quickly as the hype of the movie died down, the hustle and the step-by-step dance has continued even after the Disco Sucks movement and is still a "global social dance" and it took its place beside swing, salsa, mambo, cha-cha-cha, tango, rumba, bolero, nightclub two-step and other partner dances in America.

== New York hustle ==
The couple dance form of hustle is usually called The Hustle but is frequently referred to by other names including "The Latin hustle" or "New York Hustle". It has some resemblance to, and steps in common with, Mambo and Salsa. As in the Latin dances, couples tend to move more on the dance floor, as opposed to following a line of dance as in foxtrot.

One similarity between hustle and swing is that the lead takes the back-forward steps from his left foot; however it is not exactly a rock-step (there is no rocking action because of speed) and if the dance is taught by counting, the steps happen at the beginning of the count – "and-one, two, three" rather than at the end of the count as in swing – "left, right, rock-step". However, those who originally developed this dance never used step counts, everything was developed by sight and sound starting in 1972.

The dance is somewhat unusual rhythmically because of the syncopation it is associated with. Most dances are danced with either 4/4 or 3/4 music with counting to match, with either a triple or duple base depending on the dance. The Latin Hustle is generally danced to 4/4 music but counted as a six-beat pattern. The most common Latin Hustle counting pattern is "&1 2 3 &1 2 3", meaning "LR L R LR L R" in the leader's pattern and the natural opposite of the follower's pattern. However, the syncopation in three-count hustle also be danced: 1&23, 12&3, or 123&.

=== Common steps ===
- Basic – similar to the basic from single-step swing, except rock-step is at beginning
- Turn – 180 degrees clockwise turn taken after rock-step, between 2 and 3 counts, followed by a rock-step
- Left Turn – 180 degrees counterclockwise turn taken after rock-step, between 1 and 2 counts, followed by a rock-step
- Side Break – lead sends follow out still holding her left hand, then picks her back up
- Wheel – couple in double hand-hold, pumps arms like a bellows; couple as a whole rotates 180 degrees clockwise
- Inside Turn or Loop Turn – similar to the loop turn from swing; follower twirls 360 degrees counterclockwise
- Wrap – similar to wrap from the western swing but the footing is the same as a half turn for the hustle
- Two hand turn – uses 180 degrees turn footing, before the step the lead takes the followers right hand in his, then proceeds as if completing a wrap but changes back to mirror two hand position halfway through the step.

== See also ==
- The Commodores

== Video clips ==
- Clip (in WMV format) showing some of the basic step variations of today's hustle
- Partner dance video (in MOV format) showing a very smooth hustle; and two men and one woman dancing hustle (in AVI format); both from Hustle Dance Club
