= Roundalab =

US educational organization

The International Association of Round Dance Teachers, Inc. (ROUNDALAB) is an American educational non-profit organization established in 1976 for round dance cuers and teachers.

== Background ==
The organization publishes a manual that standardizes round dance figures in over a dozen Smooth and Latin rhythms. It sponsors an annual convention, organizes a variety of educational seminars and laboratories, and offers teaching manuals, educational videos, and guidelines for all aspects of the activity. The association also provides a comprehensive bodily injury and property damage liability insurance policy for its U.S. members' teaching and cueing activities.
