= Weight transfer (disambiguation) =

Weight transfer, or load transfer, are effects in the context of automobile and motorcycle dynamics.

Weight transfer may also refer to:

- Weight transfer (dancing)
- Transfer of weight in other contexts
