= Footwork (dance) =

Dance technique involving foot position and action

Footwork refers to dance technique aspects related to feet: foot position and foot action.

The following aspects of footwork may be considered:

- Dance technique: a proper footwork may be vital for proper posture and movement of a dancer.
- Aesthetic value: some foot positions and actions are traditionally considered appealing, while other ones are ugly, although this depends on the culture.
- Artistic expression: a sophisticated footwork may in itself be the goal of the dance expression.

Different dances place different emphasis on the above aspects.

In a narrow sense, e.g., in descriptions of ballroom dance figures, the term refers to the behavior of the foot when it meets the floor. In particular, it describes which part of the foot is in contact with the floor: ball, heel, flat, toe, high toe, inside/outside edge, etc.

== See also ==
- Glossary of partner dance terms
- Glossary of ballet terms
- Rises and falls
