= Abi Clarke =

English comedian and presenter (born 1996)

- Born: Abigail Louisa Clarke; 28 May 1996 (age 30); Henbury, Bristol, England
- Occupations: Comedian; social media personality; actress; presenter
- Parent(s): Julia Hills; Paul Clarkson

Comedy career
- Medium: Stand-up; social media videos

Abigail Louisa Clarke (born 28 May 1996) is an English comedian, social media personality, actress and presenter. After beginning her career in stand-up comedy, she joined TikTok and began posting videos which went viral. In 2026, she began hosting the Strictly Come Dancing online spin-off Strictly: Lights Up, and has made appearances on the companion show, Strictly Come Dancing: It Takes Two.

== Life and career ==
Abigail Louisa Clarke was born on 28 May 1996 in Henbury, Bristol, one of three children born to actors Julia Hills and Paul Clarkson. Her older brother, Stewart, is also an actor. She began her career in stand-up comedy in 2019 and joined TikTok soon after, on which she began posting video sketches during the COVID-19 pandemic, several of which went viral. In 2021, she appeared in several episodes of the ITV2 series The Emily Atack Show. In 2024, she appeared as Kate Potts in an episode of the BBC series Beyond Paradise and embarked on her debut show (Role) Model at the Edinburgh Festival Fringe in 2024. Clarke has hosted the podcasts Worst Case Scenario with Abi Clarke and Julia Stenton and Abi Clarke: Zookeeper in Training, the latter of which is about her training to be a zookeeper.

In 2026, Clarke was announced as the co-host of Strictly: Lights Up, an online spin-off of Strictly Come Dancing which she fronts alongside Tyler West. The premise of the series sees Clark and West catch up with the contestants and judges after an episode has finished filming. She has also contributed to the nightly spin-off series, Strictly Come Dancing: It Takes Two. In 2027, she will embark on a comedy tour, titled Just Tell Me When It's Over.

== Filmography ==
Year	Title	Role	Notes
2021	The Emily Atack Show	Various	3 episodes
2024	Beyond Paradise	Kate Potts	1 episode
2026	Strictly: Lights Up	Herself	Co-presenter
2026	Strictly Come Dancing: It Takes Two	Herself	Regular contributor

== Stand-up shows ==
- (Role) Model (2024)
- Just Tell Me When It's Over (2027)

== Podcasts ==
- Worst Case Scenario with Abi Clarke and Julia Stenton (2023–2025)
- Abi Clarke: Zookeeper in Training (2025)
