= Maxie Ford =

Tap dance step

The Maxie Ford is a tap dance step consisting of four movements: step, shuffle, leap, toe. The Maxie Ford is famous for its use of the pullback (or graboff) after the shuffle and best known as the Maxie Ford Break: 2 executions of the basic Maxie Ford and a stamp:

- The Standard Maxie Ford Break (see the Nicholas Brothers, Henry LeTang and almost every tap teacher)
- The Professional Maxie Ford Break (This form provides an additional pullback after the toe and was a favourite of many dancers (Gene Kelly, the Nicholas Brothers, Coles & Atkins, The Four Step Brothers, Tip, Tap & Toe etc.) Maxie Fords may also be done turning across the floor, such that each one is performed in a single rotation (with or without the pullback)).
