= Triple step (music) =

Dance rhythm used in music

Triple step, in music, represents a rhythmic pattern covering three dance steps done on music.

1977, British-American rock band Fleetwood Mac's released single, "Don't Stop", penned by musician and keyboardist Christine McVie from their Rumours album integrated rhythms influenced by triple step dance rhythmic patterns incorporated into the song featuring both traditional acoustic and tack piano, the second of these instrumental sounds achieved by affixing nails to the hammers' striking points on the strings, resulting in a more percussive sound.

== Gqom (3-Step) ==
The term "three-step" distinct from triple step was first coined in the mid-2010s by gqom record producers Sbucardo and Citizen Boy to describe the South African music genre gqom, named for its beat structure associated with triple metre . As the genre became more mainstream and evolved, incorporating various production techniques and styles, other gqom producers such as Emo Kid, DJ Lag, Ben Myster, and Menzi pioneered as well as developed a distinct variation of gqom music known as "3-step" (also referred to as 3 step, three-step, and other spelling variations) between the late 2010s and early 2020s. The gqom subgenre 3-step is defined by its blend of traditional gqom elements with triple metre and broken beat characteristics. Producers often fuse 3-step with other production styles and musical genres.

== Waltz (music) ==
A waltz, referred to as "Walzer" in German, "Valse" in French, "Valzer" in Italian, "Vals" in Spanish and "Walc" in Polish, is a style of dance music recognized for its triple metre, typically notated in a 3/4 time signature. The waltz likely originated from the German, Ländler. In typical waltz compositions, each measure is associated with a single chord.

== Yoruba music ==
In Yoruba music, triple metre, among other rhythmic patterns, creates a distinctive, flowing quality through a repeating cycle of three beats per measure. This rhythmic structure is prevalent in traditional Yoruba drumming and significantly influences dance movements and ceremonial performances. Additionally, triple metre is present in oríkì praise poetry, where it enhances the lyrical delivery.

== See also ==
- 2-step garage
- 2-step (breakdance move)
- Duple and quadruple metre
- Triple step
- Waltz
