= Nightclub two step =

Type of dance

Nightclub two step (NC2S, sometimes disco two step or California two step) is a partner dance initially developed by Buddy Schwimmer in the mid-1960s. The dance is also known as "Two Step" and was "one of the most popular forms of contemporary social dance" as a Disco Couples Dance in 1978. The dance, often described as floaty, mainly consists of rock steps and glides (sliding). It is frequently danced to mid-tempo ballads in 4/4 times that have a characteristic quick-quick-slow beat. A classic example is the song "The Lady In Red".

== Description ==
The nightclub two step basic step can be counted as one & two - three & four -. This timing is also known as a quick-quick-slow tempo. There is also a slow-quick-quick timing that can be used depending on the song.

The dance position for nightclub two-step is in a relaxed closed position. The footwork between the two timings (quick-quick-slow and slow-quick-quick) is identical and differs only in the first step. Using the slow-quick-quick timing as an example, the lead takes a side step with their left foot while the follower mirrors them with their right foot. On beat 2, both partners perform a rock step with the lead's right foot and the follower's left placed behind them. On the 2nd, both partners place their weight on the foot in front of them. This same pattern is repeated for beats 3 - 4 , but on the other side. This timing puts the slow on beat 1, which can be a preference depending on the music. The same footwork can be applied to the quick-quick-slow timing, but with the first step being the rock step.

The quick rock steps should be matched with the quick drum beats in the music. The "slow" drum beat and slow step can occur on either the second and fourth, or the first and third beats of a measure. Although other rhythmic interpretations of the music are possible, including the use of "breaks" in the music, they are beyond the scope of this article.

Another pattern in NC2S is the side-cross-side move. Typically, the lead starts this move by stepping to the side with their left foot and then crosses in front with their right foot. This is followed by another step to the side with the left foot. The rhythm, here, is quick, quick, slow. The following does the same thing but starts with their right foot. Both partners cross in front. In an interview with Phil Seyer Buddy said he created this move by modifying something that was popular in the 60s called the "Surfer Stomp." The surfer stomp was simply, side, together, side, touch. In the DVIDA Nightclub Two-Step syllabus, this action is called a Traveling Cross.

UCWDC lists a narrow range of 54-64 beats per minute for the dance, but historic and contemporary dance teacher Richard Powers claims that 72 to 92 beats per minute works with this dance.

=== Styling ===
On the rock step, "The toe is to the heel, but not further. Don't twist your hip. If your hip opens up, you have gone too far." A gentle but noticeable resistance should be maintained.
