= Rises and falls =

Ballroom dance technique

Rises and falls is a category of the ballroom dance technique that refers to rises and falls of the body of a dancer achieved through actions of knees and feet (ankles).

This technique is primarily recognized in International Standard and American Smooth dance categories. Rises and falls are important in waltz, foxtrot, quickstep, and Viennese waltz. Tango is described the "level" or "flat" dance, and its basic technique specifically eliminates rises/falls in the overall motion, with the exception of certain advanced figures and styles.

The expression "rises and falls of the body" is a rather vague one, and in attempts to be more precise some texts refer to center of gravity, rather than body. This may also be misleading if taken out of context: the center of gravity may be lowered, e.g., by bends and sways. In addition, a certain amount of body rise and fall may be achieved by hip action, used in Latin dance, but absolutely proscribed in Standard and Smooth.

Rises and falls of the body is a natural phenomenon during casual walking: when feet are apart the body is closer to the ground than when the feet are together. Some dances, e.g., Charleston, exaggerate this natural "bobbing", while in many others bobbing at each step is considered to be bad style or lack of proper technique.

== Actions ==
Foot rise refers to the rising of the body by pushing up onto the balls of the feet through the flexing of the ankles.

Body rise sometimes refers to the rise without foot/ankle action, therefore the meaning of the expression should be understood from the context.

No foot rise: In descriptions of the footwork of step patterns it is abbreviated as NFR and means that the heel of the support foot remains in contact with the floor until the weight is transferred onto the other foot. Most often this description is applied to a step backwards in turning figures when the person is on the inside of the turn.

Falls, i.e., returns from the position of rise, are often separated into three actions.

- Lowering refers to returning to the normal position of flat feet and "soft" i.e., lightly flexed knees.
- Compression refers to further lowering through the bending of the knees in preparation of pushing off the foot into the next step. It is not to be confused with "compression", which refers to hip action in Latin dances. The term "compression" is used to emphasize the fact that this lowering is not simply "dropping down", but rather the straining of the leg muscles (in an analogy with the compression of a spring) simultaneously with going down. This serves both smooth arrival onto the next support foot and preparation of the next step.

== See also ==
- Glossary of partner dance terms
