= Single-time swing =

Single Swing is a slower dance rhythm in the larger swing family of dances.

East Coast Swing or Jive are danced to rock-and-roll or jitterbug music that has 4 beats per measure and a tempo of 35-46 measures per minute. Most figures are written to span a measure and a half of music with a rock, recover, and two triples at the slower tempos: eight steps over six beats of music. When the tempo gets faster, it becomes more difficult to fit those triples in, and "single swing" is more comfortable. Each 6-count figure becomes, rock, recover, step, step, or slow, slow, quick, quick: four steps over the six beats of music.
