= East Coast Swing =

Type of dance

East Coast Swing (ECS) is a form of social partner dance. It belongs to the group of swing dances. It is danced under fast swing music, including: big band, rock and roll, rockabilly, and boogie-woogie.

Yerrington and Outland equated East Coast Swing to the New Yorker in 1961. Originally known as "Eastern Swing" by Arthur Murray Studios, the name East Coast Swing became more common between 1975 and 1980.

== History ==
The dance was created by dance studios including the Arthur Murray dance studios in the 1940s, based on the Lindy Hop. Lindy Hop was felt by dance studios to be both too difficult and too unstructured to teach to beginners, but there was market demand for training in swing dance. The dance studios had initially dismissed Lindy Hop in particular as a fad. East Coast Swing can be referred to by many different names in different regions of the United States and the world. It has alternatively been called Eastern Swing, Jitterbug, American Swing, East Coast Lindy, Lindy (not to be confused with Lindy Hop), and Triple Swing (or Triple-step swing). Other variants of East Coast Swing that use altered footwork forms are known as Single Swing or "Single-step Swing" (where the triple step is replaced by a single step forming a slow, slow, quick, quick rhythm common to Foxtrot), and Double Swing (using a tap-step footwork pattern).

East Coast Swing is a rhythm dance that has both 6 and 8 beat patterns. The name East Coast Swing was coined initially to distinguish the dance from the street form and the new variant used in the competitive ballroom arena (as well as separating the dance from West Coast Swing, which was developed in California). While based on Lindy Hop, it does have clear distinctions. East Coast Swing is a standardized form of dance developed first for instructional purposes in the Arthur Murray studios, and then later codified to allow for a medium of comparison for competitive ballroom dancers. It can be said that there is no right or wrong way to dance it; however, certain styles of the dance are considered correct "form" within the technical elements documented and governed by the National Dance Council of America. The N.D.C.A. oversees all the standards of American Style Ballroom and Latin dances. Lindy Hop was never standardized and later became the inspiration for several other dance forms such as: (European) Boogie Woogie, Jive, West Coast Swing and Rock and Roll.

In practice on the social dance floor, the six count steps of the East Coast Swing are sometimes mixed with the eight count steps of Lindy Hop, Charleston, and less frequently, Balboa.

== Basic Positions/Moves ==
The 5 basic positions/moves are:

1. Semi-closed Position (normal starter position)
2. Open Position (most common position used between moves)
3. Crossovers (most common move)
4. Wraps (waist wraps or neck wraps)
5. Hammerlocks

== Basic technique ==
=== Single-time Swing ===
East Coast Swing has a 6-count basic step. This is in contrast to the meter of most swing music, which has a 4-count basic rhythm. In practice, however, the 6-count moves of East Coast Swing are sometimes combined with 8-count moves from Lindy hop, Charleston, and Balboa.

Depending on the region and instructor, the basic step of single-step East Coast Swing is either "rock step, step, step" or "step, step, rock step". In both cases, the rock step always starts on the downbeat.

For "rock step, step, step" the beats, or counts, are the following:

Steps for the "lead" (traditionally, the man's part)

Rock	Beat 1 - STEP back with your LEFT foot
Step	Beat 2 - STEP forward with your RIGHT foot (to where you first started)
Step	Beat 3 - STEP to the left with your LEFT foot
	Beat 4 - Begin to shift your weight back to your right foot
Step	Beat 5 - STEP to the right with your RIGHT foot
	Beat 6 - Begin to shift your weight to the left and back

Steps for the "follow" (traditionally, the woman's part which mirrors the lead's part)

Rock	Beat 1 - STEP back with your RIGHT foot
Step	Beat 2 - STEP forward with your LEFT foot (to where you first started)
Step	Beat 3 - STEP to the right with your RIGHT foot
	Beat 4 - Begin to shift your weight back to your left foot
Step	Beat 5 - STEP to the left with your LEFT foot
	Beat 6 - Begin to shift your weight to the right and back

For "step, step, rock step," the rock step occurs on beats 5 and 6, but the overall progression remains the same.

=== Standard ECS (Lindy Swing) ===
The normal steps can be substituted with a triple step or double step "step-tap" or "kick-step" instead of a single step. This is commonly used during songs when a slower tempo makes the single step difficult (an example progression would be "rock step, triple step, triple step").

== Timing ==
Because East Coast uses a six-step pattern with music employing four beats per measure, three measures of music are required to complete two sets of steps, as shown in the following table.

Music beats (in fours):	1	2	3		4	1		2	3	4	1		2	3		4
Music beat incremental:	1	2	3		4	5		6	7	8	9		10	11		12
East Coast Triple Step Timing: (1 and 2, 3 and 4, rock step)	R	S	3	a	4	5	a	6	R	S	3	a	4	5	a	6
East Coast Single Step: (1 2 rock step)	R	S	3			5			R	S	3			5

The rock step starts on 1, 2 the first triple step starts 3a4 and the second on 5a6.

In single time style (used with faster music) the triple steps are replaced by single steps, so two beats of music are used for each single step while each step in the rock (R) step (S) is still completed in one beat, finishing the cycle in six musical beats. Some instructors will teach vocalizing the single time style as" "Quick. Quick. Slow. Slow. " or "Back Step. Slow. Slow."

There is the choice to start with triples or with a rock step, however if you check the above chart where a triple step starts on a 1, 2 you can see that the pattern progresses and wraps back around. The choice of starting with a triple or a rock step does have musical consequences as music has phrasing with hits that often happen on 12, or 24 or 36... This means that dancers who choose to start with a rock step will probably find themselves on a rock step on every new phrase. Those who start with a triple will start with a triple on each new phrase. An advantage of starting with the triple step is that dancers can more easily change their foot work right at the start of the musical phrase.

== See also ==
- Lindy hop
- Charleston
- West Coast Swing
- Balboa
- Jive
- Hand dancing
- Jitterbug - another name used for the Single Time East Coast Swing
