= Triple step =

Dance step rhythmic pattern

Triple step (also three-step or 3-step) is a generic term for dance step patterns that describes three steps or rhythms for instance done on two or four main beats of music. Usually they are two quick steps and one slow one (i.e., often they are counted as "quick-quick-slow", "one-and-two", "three-and-four", etc.)

In specific cultural contexts, "triple step" could signify a distinct dance move or style linked to a particular music genre. For instance, in line dancing or folk dances, there exists a step sequence referred to as the "three step".

== Dance ==
Some dances have a pattern known as such: "triple step". In some other dances it is referred to as the shuffle step. Some triple steps are performed in a chassé-like manner: "side step, together, side step". The "cha-cha chassé" is an example of this kind of a triple step. In some other cases the steps may be done in place. Some dances such as swing dances have several variants of triple step. The 3rd part i.e., cued as step usually uses half the time of the whole pattern, e.g. one quarter note The tri-ple part may be danced evenly, e.g., two eighth notes or unevenly (on swung notes), e.g., the first part taking up 2/3s of a beat and the second part 1/3, or the first part taking up 3/4 of the beat and the 2nd part 1/4. The pattern may also be syncopated so that the first step is shorter than the second.

=== Arará dances ===
Arará dances, characterized by emphasized triple metre and distinctive shoulder movements are deeply rooted in the cultural traditions of the Arará nation (Arará Nación), an ethnic group in Cuba, originating from the Yoruba-speaking regions of West Africa.

== See also ==
- Triple step (music)
- Waltz
- Two-step (dance move)
