= Ball change =

Ball change is a dance move that consists of two steps: a partial weight transfer on the ball of a foot (placed e.g., behind), followed by a step on the other foot.

== Kick ball change ==
Kickball change is a dance move that consists of a kick followed by the ball change. Normally it uses a split-beat count: 1&2 or 1a2 and has a syncopated feeling, i.e., the accent of the motion is on "two".

The move consists of three distinct actions and can be started with any foot.

- "One": A kick or flick with the left foot. After the kick the foot naturally swings back.
- "And": Slightly push off the floor by the ball of the left foot behind or by the right foot (partial weight transfer).
- "Two": Step with the right foot.

Details of each of the three actions vary depending on dance and styling preferences.

== Heel ball change ==
Heel ball change is a dance move popular in line dances. On count "1" the heel touches the floor forward. On count "&2" the ball change is done starting with the same foot. The whole move is done in place.
