= Open position =

Dance position

In partner dancing, an open position is a position in which partners are connected primarily at the hands. The connection is through the hands, wrists, and fingers, and relies heavily on frame and the compression and tension of both partners' arms. This is as opposed to a closed position, where partners are in closer body contact.

Many forms of dancing use the open position. Modern Jive, East Coast Swing, West Coast Swing, Lindy Hop, and Latin are primary examples, but an open position is used in waltz, country, and other styles at times.
