= Weight transfer (dancing) =

A weight transfer or weight change is dancer's movement so that their weight is moved from one supporting foot (or supporting limb/body part) to another one fully or partially.

Walking, for example, involves shifting of the body's weight from one foot to another, so freeing the first so that it may be lifted and moved forward. This process is a 'natural' movement in humans and other animals, but is in effect a complex process of biomechanics.

In the full weight transfer, the center of gravity becomes vertically projected onto another body part (e.g., foot) freeing the first one so that it may be freely lifted or moved. (In fact, lifting the foot off the ground is a simple test often suggested for the beginners to ensure that they have completed the practiced dance move and their weight is on the proper foot.)

In partial weight transfer the center of gravity is shifted to project between the old and new support body part. In some dance moves, such as ball change, the force produced by pushing with the new supporting foot at the moment of the partial weight transfer makes it possible to lift the previous support foot for a short time, followed by the drop back onto the first supporting foot subject to the gravity force.

== Partner dancing ==
Control of weight transfers is an important part of the partner dance technique. In general, important components of foot action during a dance step are foot movement, foot placement, and weight transfer.

Weight transfers of the leader are important cues in leading and following.
