= Dance figure =

Term

In the context of dance, a figure is a named pattern of movement that is bigger than a step and smaller than a phrase. Figures were a widespread feature of Western social dances in the 17th, 18th and 19th centuries, and typically involved multiple dancers creating formations and patterns.

== History ==
Dances were documented using a variety of notations, which would graphically represent the ballroom floor and the ways dancers would travel through space on that floor. Figures remain a feature of popular group social dances derived from these older forms, including Contra dancing, Irish dancing and American square dancing.

== Example figures ==
Common figures taught in Irish Ceili dance today include "Advance and Retire," "Figure of Eight," "Hands Round Four," etc. Irish stepdances are often built around a single figure, which alternates with steps, similar to the repeating theme in a musical Rondo. Dances constructed in this way are called figure dances.

== Calling and skating ==
Some forms of figure dancing, such as square dancing, feature a caller who tells the dancers which figure to perform next; dancers are expected to learn a shared vocabulary of figures and perform them upon request by the caller. English Style Skating works in a similar manner, except dancers are working on a sheet of ice instead of a dance floor.
