= Rock step =

Dance move

Rock step (also called break step) may refer to one of several similar dance moves. The name refers to the rocking action during the move: the weight is transferred from one foot to another and then back. It is used in a number of dances, such as East Coast Swing, Zydeco, Lindy Hop, Tango.

Most often it is a two-step dance move executed in two beats of music. There are two basic versions: rock back and rock forward. They may start with any foot.

== Basic rocks ==
In rock back, the dancer steps backwards with full weight transfer then transfers the weight back to the front foot while keeping it in place. In rock forward, the dancer steps forward with full weight transfer then transfers the weight to the back foot while keeping it in place.

In some dances, e.g., East Coast Swing or Lindy Hop, the partners rock from opposite feet in opposite directions, i.e., both are doing rock back, e.g., during the basic step sequence: "triple step, triple step, rock step". In others the rocks are done from opposite feet, but in the same direction, i.e., when the leader rocks back, the follower rocks forward.

== Turning rocks ==
In some dances (Tango, Argentine tango) the rock step is used to change the direction of travel. In such cases a one or both steps the dancer may perform a certain amount of pivot turn.

In Lindy Hop, the turning rock step is also known as a rotational rock step, due to the rotation of the body's center to change direction or prep for a move. The degree of rotation in the turning rock step varies with how far the dancer wants to change direction. When used as a prep for a move, the degree of rotation depends on how much tension must be built up in the connection between the dancers in order to properly execute the move.

== Rock step vs break step ==
Sometimes the terms rock step and break step are used interchangeably e.g., Forward Rock and Forward Break. The stylistic difference is that in the rock step the emphasis is in the rocking action during the step, while the term break carries the meaning of the change of the direction into the opposite, i.e., the forward break changes the direction of the movement from forward to backward.

== Dance variations named "Rock Step" ==
- In Zydeco, the Rock Step is the name of a pattern obtained from the Zydeco's Basic Step if the leader on count 6 makes a little push for the follower to rock back (on 7,8) and rocks himself back.
