= Closed position =

Category of positions

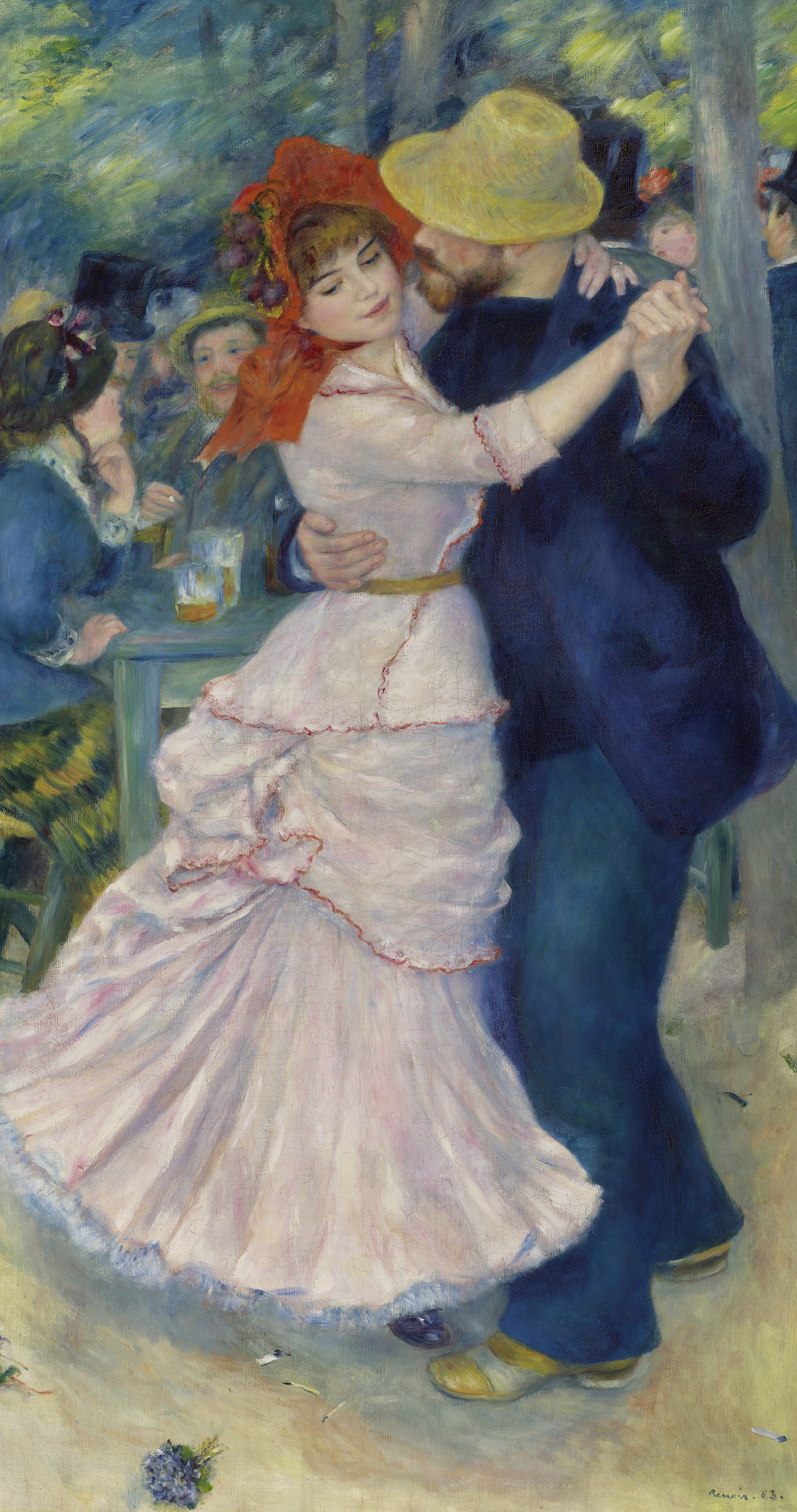
Dance at Bougival, by Pierre-Auguste Renoir, 1883

In partner dancing, closed position is a category of positions in which partners hold each other while facing at least approximately toward each other.

Closed positions employ either body contact or body support, that is, holding each other is not limited to handhold. If the partners are comfortable with each other and the dance style allows it, body contact increases the connection between the partners. Some dances, such as Balboa and Collegiate Shag are only done in body contact.

== In waltz ==
The most commonly used kind of closed position comes from the waltz, and is very commonly used in ballroom dance. The leader's right hand is on the follower's back (or, rarely, on the left upper arm near the shoulder); its exact placement on the back ranges from the waist to the left shoulder blade. The follower's left hand is on the leader's right shoulder, or the upper arm near the shoulder. The other two hands are clasped together at or near chest or shoulder height.

Unlike the ballroom style, in social fast turning (or Viennese-style tempos) waltz, the follower's left hand usually is completely around the leader's right shoulder in a firm mutually supporting close or contact embrace. Each partner alternately but smoothly assists in the half turn with body leads while continuously right turning in line of direction in a "V" position. A similar close embrace position but with both hands around each other can be seen in smooth turning polka and other folk dances.

== Similar dances ==
Some specific varieties of this kind of closed position are used in specific categories of ballroom dance. For instance, in the American tradition and the older European traditions, the joined hands are usually held lower than the shoulder, with the elbows low and often sharply bent. In the international standard ballroom dances the joined hands are held at or just above shoulder height, with the arms outstretched and the elbows bent at obtuse angles. In the latter style the leader's right hand stays on the left side of the follower's back and (except in the tango) is placed on the shoulder blade, while the follower's left hand is placed on the leader's right upper arm (or, in the tango, underneath the upper arm).

Many other kinds of closed positions are used in folk dance. In closed shoulder-waist position the leader holds the follower's waist with both hands, while the follower places both hands on the leader's shoulders. In Scandinavian folk dance (e.g. the polska, pols, and hambo) there are variations on shoulder-waist position in which the leader's left hand is on the follower's shoulder, upper arm, or elbow, and in the latter case the follower's right arm is outstretched with the hand just above the leader's sharply bent elbow.

The lavolta, one of the more famous Renaissance dances, used a distinctive kind of closed position in which the follower faced to one side from the leader and put the near hand on top of the leader's shoulder, while the leader used both hands to hold the follower under the busk.

== See also ==
- Slow dance
- Open position
- Close embrace
- Frame
- Connection
- Ballroom dance for a list of partner dances, including non-ballroom styles.
