= Foxtrot =

Dance

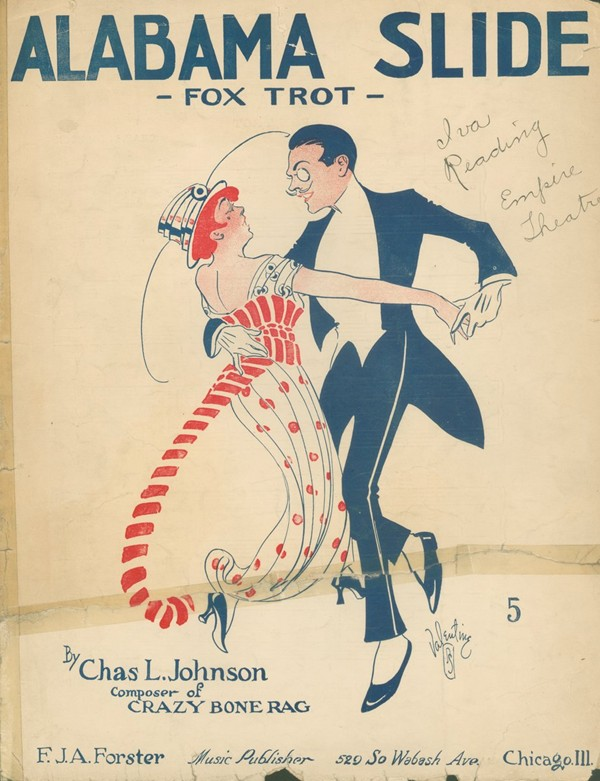
- Genre: Ballroom dance
- Time signature: 4/4
- Year: 1914

The foxtrot is a smooth, progressive dance characterized by long, continuous flowing movements across the dance floor. It is danced to big band (usually vocal) music. The dance is similar in its look to waltz, although the rhythm is in a 4/4 time signature instead of 3/4. Developed in the 1910s, the foxtrot reached its height of popularity in the 1930s and remains practiced today.

== History ==
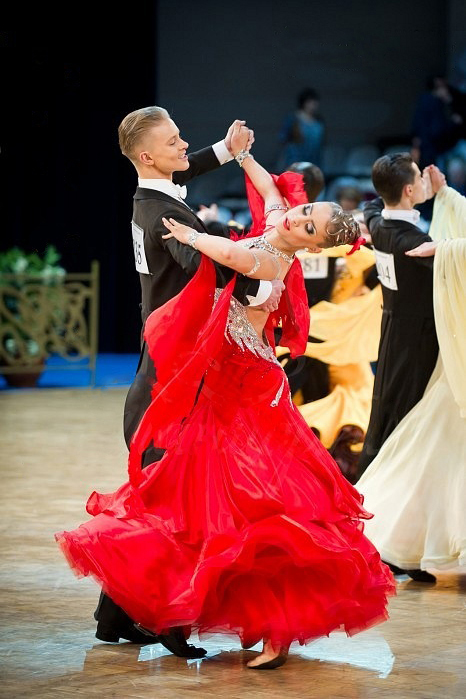
Dancesport version of foxtrot

The dance was premiered in 1914, quickly catching the eye of the husband and wife duo Vernon and Irene Castle, who gave the dance its signature grace and style. The origin of the name of the dance is unclear, although one theory is that it took its name from its popularizer, the vaudevillian Harry Fox. Two sources, Vernon Castle and dance teacher Betty Lee, credit African American dancers as the source of the foxtrot. Castle saw the dance, which "had been danced by negroes, to his personal knowledge, for fifteen years, [at] a certain exclusive colored club".

W. C. Handy ("Father of the Blues") notes in his autobiography that his "The Memphis Blues" was the inspiration for the foxtrot. During breaks from the fast-paced Castle Walk and One-Step, Vernon and Irene Castle's music director, James Reese Europe, would slowly play "The Memphis Blues". The Castles were intrigued by the rhythm, and Jim suggested they create a slow dance to go with it. The Castles introduced what they then called the "Bunny Hug" in a magazine article. Shortly after, they went abroad and, in mid-ocean, sent a wireless to the magazine to change the name of the dance from "Bunny Hug" to "Foxtrot." It was subsequently standardized by Arthur Murray, in whose version it began to imitate the positions of tango.

At its inception, the foxtrot was originally danced to ragtime. From the late 1910s through the 1940s, the foxtrot was the most popular fast dance, and the vast majority of records issued during these years were foxtrots. The waltz and tango, while popular, never overtook it. Even the popularity of the Lindy Hop in the 1940s did not affect the foxtrot's popularity, since it could be danced to the same records used to accompany the Lindy hop.

When rock and roll first emerged in the early 1950s, record companies were uncertain as to what style of dance would be most applicable to the music. Notably, Decca Records initially labeled its rock and roll releases as "foxtrots", most notably "Rock Around the Clock" by Bill Haley and His Comets. Since that recording, by some estimates, went on to sell more than 25 million copies, "Rock Around the Clock" could be considered the biggest-selling "foxtrot" of all time. Today, the dance is customarily accompanied by the same big band music to which swing is also danced.

Over time, the foxtrot split into slow and quick versions, referred to as "foxtrot" and "quickstep" respectively. In the slow category, further distinctions exist between the International or English style of the foxtrot, and the American continuity style, both built around a slow-quick-quick rhythm at the slowest tempo, and the social American style using a slow-slow-quick-quick rhythm at a somewhat faster pace. In the context of International Standard category of ballroom dances, for some time the foxtrot was called "Slow Foxtrot", or "Slowfox". These names are still in use, to distinguish from other types of foxtrots.

== Styles ==
Three distinct styles of slow foxtrot are in common use among ballroom dancers today: the American Social Style, the American Continuity Style, and the International Style. All three are partner dances in which the dancers progress around the dance floor in a counter-clockwise direction and are danced to much the same music. However, they differ significantly in technique, positions, and figures.

=== American Social Foxtrot ===
The American Social Style was, and to some extent still is, widely employed in the United States as a social and party dance. It is particularly well suited to dancing in a crowded room, by partners who may or may not know each other well, and who may or may not have had much formal training in dance. Its defining feature is that the dancers close their feet at the end of almost every figure, as opposed to passing their feet as in the other two styles. As a result, the dancers progress fairly slowly around the room, and some figures can even be danced in place. Furthermore, almost every figure begins in much the same position, with the two partners facing each other squarely in the closed position and the man starting on his left foot. Since each figure leads so easily and consistently in the next, it is fairly easy for the leader to string multiple figures together on the fly in an ever-changing sequence. Body contact is unnecessary and not generally expected; all figures can be led through the frame formed by the arms. Hence, the potential social awkwardness of body contact between partners who do not know each other well is avoided. As American Social Style is the only style allowed in bronze (beginner) level American Style dance competition, this style is sometimes also known as "American Bronze Foxtrot".

The American Social style uses both six-count and eight-count figures. The rhythmic alteration between the two is one of the few potential difficulties in the dance. Syncopation is generally avoided.

The six-count figures extend across one and a half measures of music, and use the rhythm slow (two counts), slow (two counts), quick (one count), quick (one count). Examples include: the basic movement forward and back, the alternating quarter turns (zig-zag), the rock turns right and left, the promenade, the promenade twist (12 counts), the promenade pivot (12 counts), and the sway step. Social dancers generally use the alternating quarter turns to progress in a zig-zag pattern around the room, alternating for variety with the promenade. Rock turns are used for changes of direction in corners and to avoid collisions. Both the rock turns and balance step can be danced entirely in place, if necessitated by crowded conditions. Many of these figures can be further embellished by underarm turns.

The eight-count figures extend across two measures of music and use the rhythm slow (two counts), quick (one count), quick (one count); slow (two counts), quick (one count), quick (one count). Most of them can be further decomposed into two four-count figures, although this would break the convention that every figure begins in closed position with the man stepping on his left foot. Examples include: the forward and reverse box, the left and right box turns, the closed twinkle with promenade close ending, the fallaway twinkles (16 counts), the promenade twinkles (16 counts), and the serpentine (progressive twinkles) with closed footwork. A few, such as the grapevine, utilize a faster rhythm consisting of four quicks. Most of these eight-count figures resemble corresponding figures in the waltz, with the rhythm modified by extending the first step of each figure to occupy two counts. Again, many of these figures can be further embellished by underarm turns.

The only common syncopated figure is the chassé. It is a four-count figure with the rhythm slow (two counts) quick-and-quick (two counts), that may be inserted between a closed twinkle and its promenade close ending.

=== American Continuity style ===
The American Continuity Style is widely employed in the United States as a competitive dance and as a base for formation dance and the performing arts. It is the style generally seen in American musical theater productions and in film. It differs from the social style in that the dancers pass their feet at the end of each figure, rather than closing them. Consequently, dancers progress much more rapidly around the room, in a smooth, continuous manner that gives the style its name. It differs from the International Style in that body contact is optional. This permits the dance partners to assume a much wider variety of positions and, therefore, to execute many types of figures that are not possible in the International Style. As American Continuity Style is expected in Silver Level American Style dance competitions and above, this style is sometimes also known as "American Silver Foxtrot".

Transitions from one dance position to another are an important aspect of the American style. Commonly employed dance positions include normal (closed) position, in which the dancers face each other squarely with the man's right hand around the woman's back; promenade position, in which the partners open slightly in a vee; open position (a two-hand hold with the arms extending forward sideways); and shadow position (in which both partners face the same direction, rather than each other). Partners may even separate completely for short periods of time. "Lines", in which the partners form and hold a special shape for a short period of time, also play an important role. Examples include the oversway, the chair, the check.

In the American Continuity Style, most figures are based upon four-count units with the rhythm slow (two counts), quick (one count), quick (one count) repeating in each measure. A basic dance sequence progressing around the room in a straight line might consist of an open left box turn (eight counts), an open twinkle (four counts), an open right turn (four counts), an open impetus (a/k/a hairpin) (four counts), and a continuity ending (four counts), returning to the start of the sequence. Other figures based upon the same rhythm include the serpentine (a/k/a progressive twinkles) with open footwork; the curved running steps; the outside swivel; the pivot from promenade; and the natural fallaway. Many of these figures may be executed in a variety of positions: for instance, the serpentine may be executed in closed position, open position, or shadow position, with the man facing either forwards or backwards. Many of these figures may be further embellished by underarm turns, especially when changing from one dance position to another. Variations upon this basic rhythm may employ four quick steps (quick, quick, quick, quick) as in the grapevine and the second measure of the weave, or syncopation (slow, quick-and-quick quick) as in the chassé.

Many Continuity-Style Foxtrot figures are similar to those of American Continuity Style Waltz, with the rhythm modified by extending the first step of each figure to occupy two counts. Some, like the open twinkles, are direct developments of the corresponding Social Foxtrot figures in which the footwork has been modified by passing the feet at the end of the figure instead of closing the feet; others are entirely different.

=== International style ===
The International (British) Style is widely employed in Europe and Great Britain as a social and competitive dance. Its defining characteristic is that partners must maintain body contact at all times. Consequently, the variety of possible figures and positions is much more limited than in the American style. Dancers concentrate on creating an image of a smooth, gliding motion around the dance floor. The use of body contact makes it possible to execute very tight turns, which is further enhanced by the extensive use of heel turns. This use of heel turns, and the effort required to produce the desired gliding motion, give International Style Foxtrot a reputation as being perhaps the most difficult of all ballroom dances to execute well.

Most figures are based upon four-count units with the rhythm slow (two counts), quick (one count), quick (one count), repeating in each measure. A basic dance sequence progressing around the room might employ a feather step (four counts), reverse turn with feather finish (eight counts), three step (four counts), natural turn (four counts) with impetus (four count) and feather finish (four count), connecting again to a reverse turn. However, rhythmic variation is used to make up for the loss of variety in figures and positions: thus, for example, the weave uses four quick steps in a single measure, while the change of direction uses a two-measure sequence of four slow steps.

'True Blue' Foxtrot (1920)
by Albert Bokhare Saunders (1880–1946)

==== Figures ====
International Style Foxtrot is the most tightly defined of all the Foxtrot styles, with instructional and competitive syllabi that are controlled by the Imperial Society of Teachers of Dancing. Below is a (non-exhaustive) list of International or English style foxtrot figures.

Basic Figures
- Three Step
- Feather Step
- Natural Turn
- Reverse Turn
- Closed Impetus
- Feather Finish
Standard Figures
- Natural Weave
- Basic Weave
- Closed Telemark
- Open Telemark
- Hover Feather
- Hover Telemark
- Hover Cross
- Open Impetus
- Reverse Wave

== Competition ==
International Foxtrot is one of the five Standard dances that form the backbone of International Style Dance competitions held around the world under the auspices of the International Dance Sport Federation, its local affiliates, and other organizations. Competitions are generally held at six successive levels of difficulty: Bronze (beginning), Silver (intermediate), Gold (advanced), Novice, Pre-Championship, and Championship. The Bronze, Silver, and Gold levels are syllabus levels: that is, for each level there is a prescribed syllabus of figures from which the competitor is expected to select. The Novice, Pre-Championship, and Championship levels are open levels at which novel, original choreography is permitted and even encouraged. The competitive dance syllabi are defined and tightly controlled by the Imperial Society of Teachers of Dancing.

Likewise, American Foxtrot is one of the four Modern Smooth dances that form the backbone of American Style Dance competitions held in the United States under the auspices of the National Dance Council of America and USA Dance, and in some other countries. Competitions are again generally held at six successive levels of difficulty: Bronze (beginning), Silver (intermediate), Gold (advanced), Novice, Pre-Championship, and Championship. The Bronze, Silver, and Gold levels are restricted levels in which the permitted set of figures is restricted by rules – very similar but not identical – published by the sponsoring organization. The Novice, Pre-Championship, and Championship levels are open levels at which novel, original choreography is permitted and even encouraged. At the Bronze level, only American Social Style is allowed; this is enforced by rules that require closing the feet at the end of each figure. Either Social or Continuity Style may be employed at the Silver level and higher, but Continuity Style is generally expected. There are multiple, alternative instructional and competitive syllabi published by various organizations, which are compatible to varying degrees with the competitive rule sets.

== See also ==
- Peabody
- Quickstep
