= African-American dance =

Type of dance

Blues dance at a juke joint, early 20th century.

African-American dance is a form of dance that was created by Africans in the Diaspora, specifically the United States. It has developed within various spaces throughout African-American communities in the United States, rather than studios, schools, or companies. These dances are usually centered on folk and social dance practice, though performance dance often supplies complementary aspects to this. Placing great value on improvisation, these dances are characterized by ongoing change and development. There are a number of notable African-American modern dance companies using African-American cultural dance as an inspiration, among these are the Whitey's Lindy Hoppers, Alvin Ailey American Dance Theater, Dance Theatre of Harlem, and Katherine Dunham Company. Hollywood and Broadway have also provided opportunities for African-American artists to share their work and for the public to support them.

African American dance has had many waves of ingenuity, especially in the 20th century. The Harlem Renaissance was an especially important time for this artform and greatly influenced modern dance.

African American dance has been an important part of competition, tradition, and cultural expression, and plays an integral role in African American culture. Many of these dance moves have also been co-opted by White dancers and entered mainstream media.

== History ==
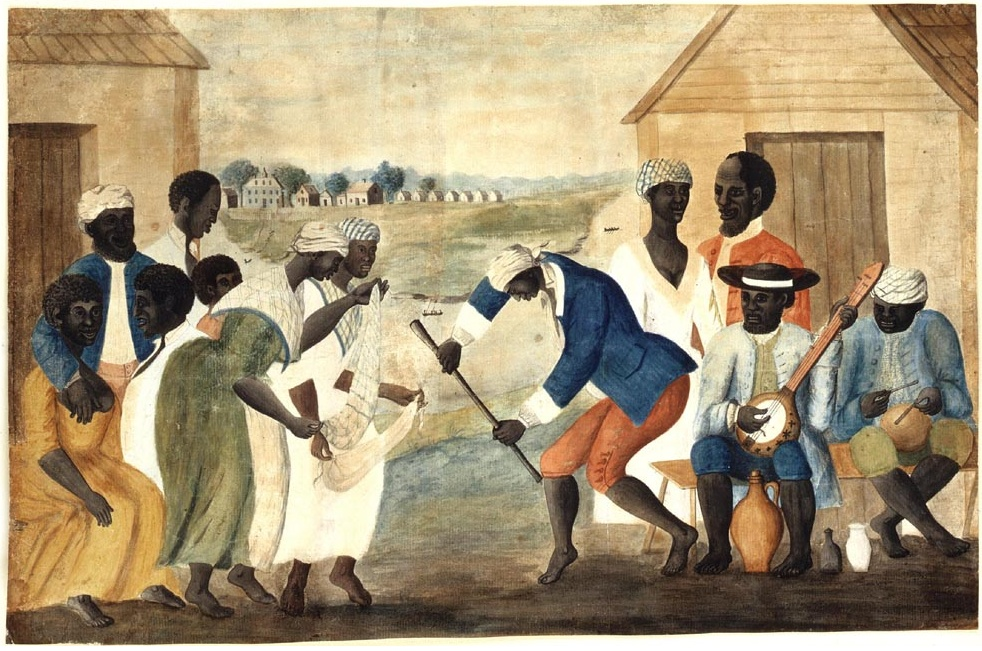
Slaves dancing

After the start of the slave trade in the 1500s, Africans brought their dances to North, Central, and South America, along with the Caribbean islands. Slaves would often dance to entertain their white slave masters.

=== Development during slavery ===
The Greater Chesapeake area encompassing Virginia, Maryland, and much of North Carolina was the earliest and perhaps most influential location of the black-white cultural interchange that produced "African-American" dance. Given their cultural differences, particularly with music and dance, they most likely learned to dance together by creating brand-new dances to draw on their traditions without replicating them precisely. Throughout the America, slaves blended tribal rhythms from their roots in Africa with ballroom rhythms of the US to create a distinctive African-American form of dance. The tribal rhythms frequently originated from East and West Africa. The call and response dance forms that are popular among modern African-American dancers can trace their roots back to these locations. Elements of European dances were also absorbed into these creolized dances, and by the late 18th century, the area had developed a recognizable dance style.

Dance and music were a big part of African society, and that tradition carried on in the diaspora. African American slaves also used dance and music as part of their religious ceremonies and other social events in their community. Other times, dance was forced on slaves as a way to entertain slave masters, but this was reclaimed as a way for slaves to entertain themselves and pass the time while working, or at night when spending time with each other.

The limited pictorial record indicates that the original African movements, which emphasized bending at the waist and hips, eventually faded away in favor of a more upright style, similar to European dances. However, it has been argued that this change was not an adoption of the European style, but actually reflected the African practice of carrying heavy loads on the head, which requires a straight, upright spine. Black dancing continued to reflect other African characteristics such as angularity and asymmetry of body positions, multiple body rhythms or polyrhythms, and a low center of gravity.

Katrina Thompson found that the evolution of black music and dance emphasizes dance as a form of release. In some instances, slaveholders forced slaves to sing and dance to entertain them while they worked. The act of singing and dancing for themselves thus became an act of reclamation. The cakewalk, for example, developed on plantations as a subtle mockery of the formal, mannered dancing practiced by slaveholding whites. The slaves would dress in handed-down finery and comically exaggerate the poised movements of minuets and waltzes for their own amusement. A 1981 article by Brooke Baldwin concludes that the cakewalk was meant "to satirize the competing culture of supposedly 'superior' whites. Slaveholders were able to dismiss its threat in their own minds by considering it as a simple performance which existed for their own pleasure".

Black slaves would often dance after a day of picking cotton.

=== Black Vaudeville ===
(main article: Black Vaudeville)

Early performances of African American dances in mainstream spaces were not done by Black performers, but rather White dancers in black face. These dance performances were interpreted more as a satirical comedy or "slapstick burlesque" as opposed to genuine artistry.

But at the end of the 19th century and the beginning of the 20th, all-Black Vaudeville shows with chorus line dancers started popping up, including The Creole Show and Isham's Octaroons. Black entrepreneurs like Sherman Dudley, Pat Chapelle, and the Griffin Sisters developed Vaudeville touring companies and theater circuits to showcase African-American talent, paving the way for African-American Musical Theater. Notable entertainers included dancer/choreographer Aida Overton Walker, "The Queen of Cakewalk", and The Whitman Sisters, who ran a touring company considered 'an incubator for Black Talent,' especially dancers. Tap dance, a fusion of Irish and African American movements, was made popular at this time by Black dancers, including Bill Bojangles Robinson, John Bubbles, and the Nicholas Brothers. Shows from this era introduced dances like the Cakewalk, Juba, Pigeon Wing, and Possum Walk to more audiences. This era also included a large migration of Black performers from the US to Europe to escape the intense racism that was prevalent, not just in the performance scene, but everywhere.

=== New York City and the Harlem Renaissance ===
Just as the Harlem Renaissance saw the development of art, poetry, literature and theater in Harlem during the early 20th century, it also saw the development of a rich musical and dance life: clubs (Cotton Club), ballrooms (Savoy Ballroom), the home rent party and other black spaces as the birthplaces of new dances, theaters and the shift from vaudeville to local "shows" written and choreographed by African-American artists; theaters as public forums for popularizing African-American cultural dances. The Harlem Renaissance was the first time that an all-black production found itself on Broadway, with Shuffle Along debuting in 1921. Florence Mills was the first Black woman to headline a Broadway venue, and her work helped to eradicate racial stereotypes of black people, both in the performance industry and in society.

Following the release of The Great Gatsby in 1925, African American dance terms began to enter mainstream American slang. Terms like "jazzin' it", "goose bumps", "in the groove", and "swing" began to be used not just by the African American performance community, but average Whites too. With the move of these terms to the mainstream, the people that originated them soon followed suite. The first professional African American dance company, Hampton Institute Creative Dance Group, was created in 1928. Soon after in 1931, Katherine Dunham created Ballet Negre, later renamed Chicago Dance Group. Dunham also choreographed a show entitled Rites de Passage in 1943, which detailed the story of her life in Haiti. This performance was one of the first of its kind that told a specifically Black story that detailed an experience White audiences would not be able to relate to. This was very new for its time, as the majority of the shows at that time were performances filled with White dancers, telling White stories.

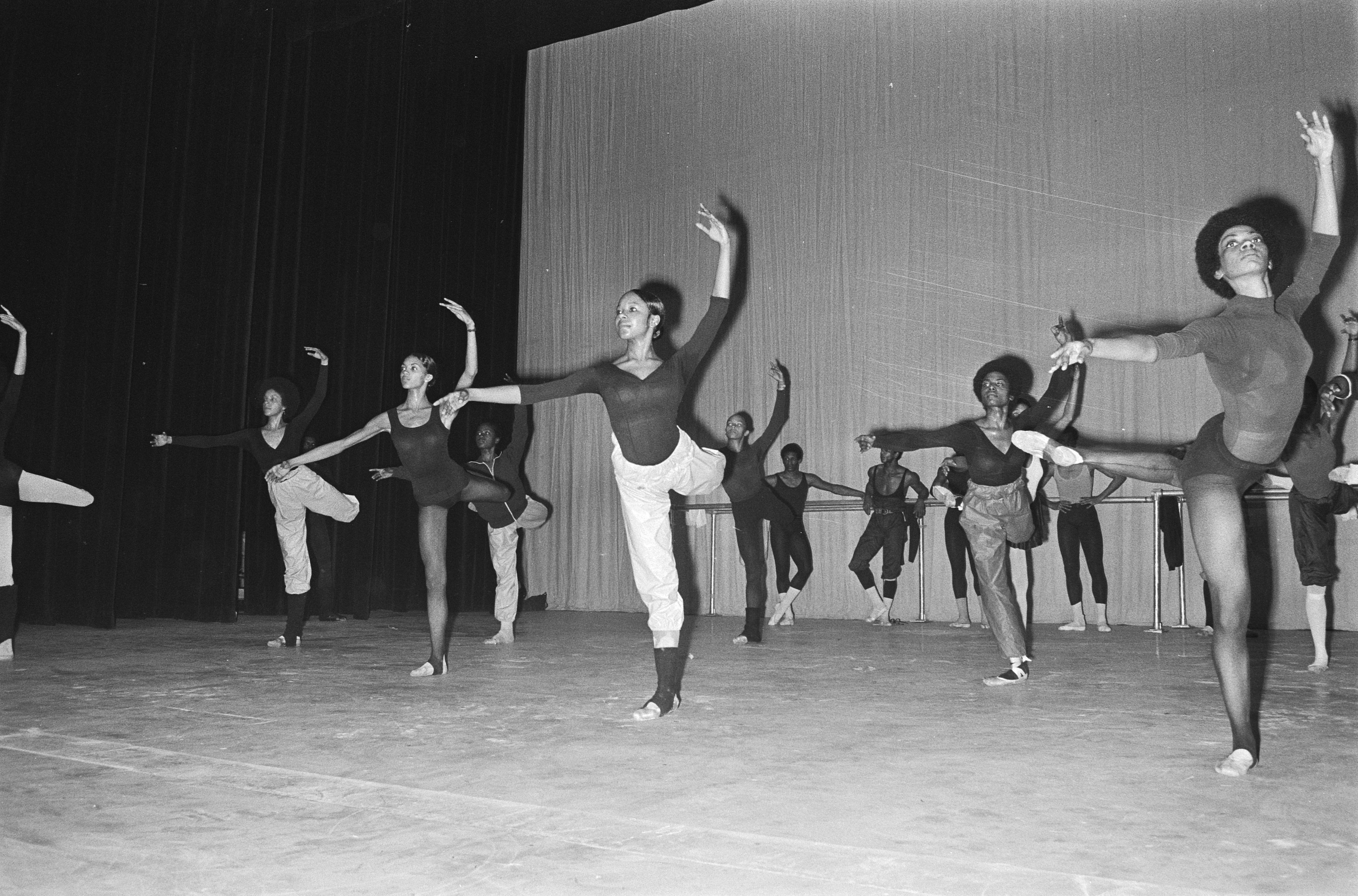
Ballet rehearsal at the Dance Theater of Harlem, 24 July 1971

In the late 1960s, Arthur Mitchell and Karel Shook created the Dance Theater of Harlem, and it quickly became a world-renowned African American ballet company. They taught both classical ballet and modern ethnic dance, so there was a blend of dance types in their performances that was uniquely African American. The studio toured both nationally and internationally, going so far as to perform at the White House and the 1984 Olympic Games. They were the first dance studio that was catered towards black dancers with the goal to give these dancers the change to learn all kinds of dance. Their efforts made great strides in erasing the color barrier in the field of dance, and especially in classical ballet.

In the 1980s, Voguing was a popular type of performance at events known as Balls. Ball culture was a way for black people, mostly LGBTQ+ performers and women, to come together and compete, to show off, and have a chance to be seen. Paris Is Burning is a documentary about ball culture and its evolution shown through the eyes of the drag mothers (leaders of the drag houses). It discusses how they started, how they came to be, and the culture of them.

=== The Bay Area ===
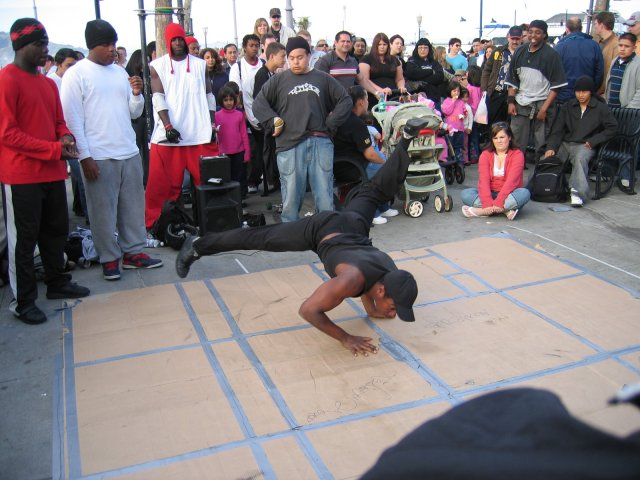
Hip hop street dancing, aka break dancing, in San Francisco.

San Francisco's Bay Area was also a big contributor to the art of Hip-Hop, both in the music and the dance aesthetics. As Hip-Hop grew in popularity in New York, the West Coast funk movement was also thriving, and the two had influences on the style of the other. KMEL was a radio station in San Francisco that was very popular throughout the different neighborhoods in the Bay Area, and they played music that was not super mainstream. The station was one of the first to play Hip-Hop music, and helped it get the outreach it needed to become popular throughout the large city. Hip-Hop dance became such an integral part of these communities, that different neighborhoods in the area would each have signature styles or techniques, and one could tell where someone was from just based on their moves.

=== African-American modern dance ===
Breakdancing is a central part of African-American modern dance, as it is the base for many more specific types of dance to stem from. It is also considered one of the pillars of Hip-Hop, and is essential to that music community and aesthetic.

Breakdancing was created in the South Bronx, New York, in the 1970s, beginning as an underground dance movement. It started as a result of Hip-Hop music, as a physical performance during the interlude of a DJ's set. The vocals would die out and it would be just instrumental music. This "break" in the song would then have a dance performed during it, and the term "Breakdance" was coined. Improvisation plays a key role in Breakdancing, as it lets people express themselves and their gut impulses, similar to the moves found in Spiritual African dance, as well as compete with others and show off their skills in the spur of the moment. Being able to think on one's feet is crucial for Hip-Hop and Breakdancing, and impulsivity is part of the art style.[5] Part of the crowd aspect of Breakdancing is the concept of cypher. Cypher refers to the group of onlookers that gather around the breakdancing performers to cheer, diss, and just generally react to the competition.

Breakdancing became mainstream in the 1980s, following the release of the movie Flashdance that portrayed Breakdancing dance moves to the world. Since then, it has become an international art form and phenomenon, stretching to other countries like Germany, South Korea, Japan, and France. It has also found its way into many more professional dance areas, like the competition show So You Think You Can Dance. Hollywood's depictions on Breakdance have been slightly harmful though, because it has reduced the Hip-Hop dance movement to just Breakdance, and ignored many other types of dance.

== Performance, competition and social dance ==
Milwaukee United Steppers giving a glimpse of Milwaukee Style stepping and bopping

Competition has long played an important role in social dance in African-American social dance, from the "battles"' of hip hop and lindy hop to the cakewalk. Performances have also been integrated into everyday dance life, from the relationship between performance and socializing in tap dancing to the "shows" held at Harlem ballrooms in the 1930s.

=== Social dance spaces ===
- Juke joint, street parties, rent party and the importance of the front porch
- Ballrooms, cabaret clubs and church halls

=== Competitive dance ===
- Cakewalks, described as a dance which derived from slaves before the civil war; originally called "the prize walk". Accompanied the "ragtime" style of music in the late 19th century, which as well as the dance itself came to form from African Americans.
- The Harvest Moon Ball
- Breakdance
- Lindy Hop

=== Protest and activism ===
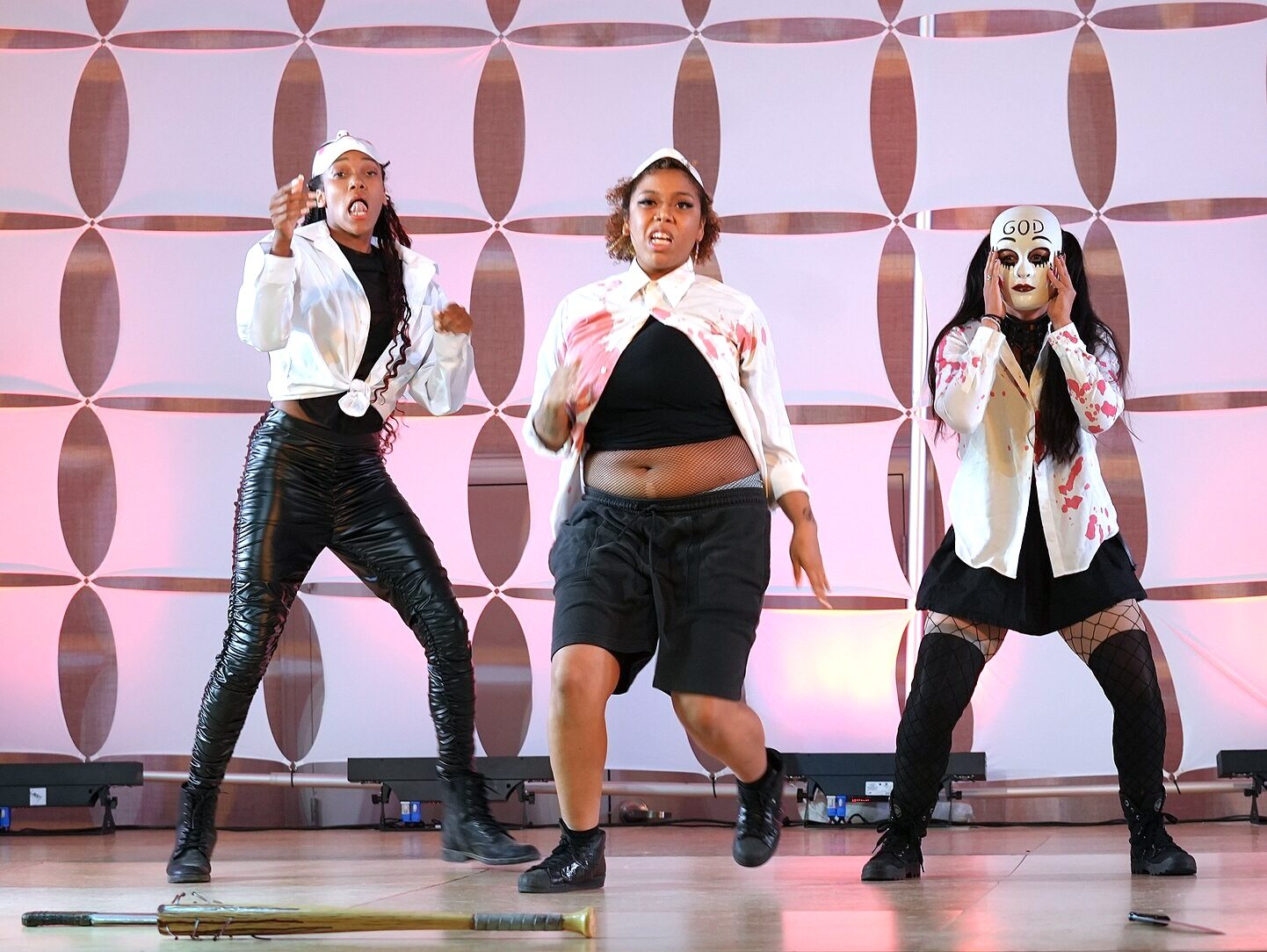
Performance at the California Dance Festival (2025)

African-American dance is often used as a way to combat colonialism and white supremacy. These performances can be seen as a commentary on society at present, or in the past. Oftentimes, dance is used in a way to combat stereotypes, empower the dancers by breaking free of western and Eurocentric beauty standards, and help them work through generational racial trauma.

Dance is used in this case to tell stories that are personal to those of African descent and the African diaspora. It incorporates dance moves that stem from Africa itself, as well as other diaspora populations like those found in Haiti and the Caribbean. This fusion style of dance, a combination of the flexibility and flow of European style dances with the African style of isolated and vivid movement, can be used to create modern techniques that better represent their history. As we see in classical ballets, where a story is being told through dance, this fusion style of dance also serves to tell the stories of African-American dancers and their ancestors.

Dance can also be used to bring African-American populations together. In urban settings that face a lot of gang violence, Breakdancing could be found as an alternative form of settling disputes. It utilized the mind and body to compete against each other, and a clear winner could be found based on audience reactions, but it did not require any violence. Gangs could settle arguments with solo or crew performances, without any weapons or bloodshed.

== Tradition and cultural expression ==
In most African-American dance cultures, learning to dance does not happen in formal classrooms or dance studios. Children often learn to dance as they grow up, developing not only a body awareness but also aesthetics of dance which are particular to their community. Learning to dance – learning about rhythmic movement – happens in much the same way as developing a local language 'accent" or a particular set of social values. Children learn specific dance steps or "how to dance' from their families – most often from older brothers and sisters, cousins or other older children. Because cultural dance happens in everyday spaces, children often dance with older members of the community around their homes and neighborhoods, at parties and dances, on special occasions, or whenever groups of people gather to "have a good time". Cultural dance traditions are therefore often cross-generational traditions, with younger dancers often "reviving" dances from previous generations, albeit with new "cool" variations and "styling". This is not to suggest that there are no social limitations on who may dance with whom and when. Dance partners (or people to dance with) are chosen by a range of social factors, including age, sex, kinship, interest and so on. The most common dance groups are often comprised by people of a similar age, background and often sex (though this is a varying factor).

Lee Ellen Friedland and other authors argue that to talk about cultural dancing without talking about music or art or drama is like talking about fish without talking about water. Music and dance are intimately related in African-American cultural dance, not only as accompaniments, but as intertwined creative processes.

"African American Cultural Dance" was a description coined by National Dance Association author and researcher Frank R. Ross, who correctly replaced the old stereotyped "vernacular" (native or natural) definition of African-American dance with its correct definition as "cultural" (sanctioned by the National Dance Association and International Dance Council).

Some African-American dances of today are the Detroit Ballroom and Social – Chicago Steppin & Walking, D.C. Baltimore, Hand Dance, Calypso & The NAACP Sanctioned Grand March – National Black Wedding & Reunion Dance. Black dance organizations include Gentlemen of Ballroom of Cleveland Master Dancers of Akron, OH. Dance Fusion, World Class-Detroit, Majestic Gents – Chicago Smooth & Easy D.C. Tri – State – Love to dance – Sugarfoot of Baltimore, MD. The new American dance art form of African-American cultural dance and music was accepted into the New York City Schools dance education curriculum.

Jacqui Malone describes the relationships between tap dancers who traveled with bands in the early 20th century, describing the way tap dancers worked with the musicians to create new rhythms. Much has been written about the relationship between improvisation in jazz and improvisation in jazz dance – the two are linked by their emphasis on improvisation and creative additions to compositions while they are in process – choreography and composition on the spot, in a social context – rather than a strict division between "creation" and "performance", as in the European middle class ballet and operatic tradition. African Dance is supposed to be about a person getting connected to the ground and telling their story and struggles using dance. It also allows people to feel the vibrations of their dance beneath their feet, allowing them to dance how they please, utilizing the space that they have so they can express themselves freely.

It is equally important to talk about the relationship between DJs MCs, b-boys and b-girls and graffiti artists in hip hop culture, and John F. Szwed and Morton Marks have discussed the development of jazz and jazz dance in America from European set dances and dance suites in relation to the development of musical artisanship.

== African-American modern dance ==
African America modern dance blends modern dance with African and Caribbean movement (flexible torso and spine, articulated pelvis, isolation of the limbs, and polyrhythmic movement). Notable people included:

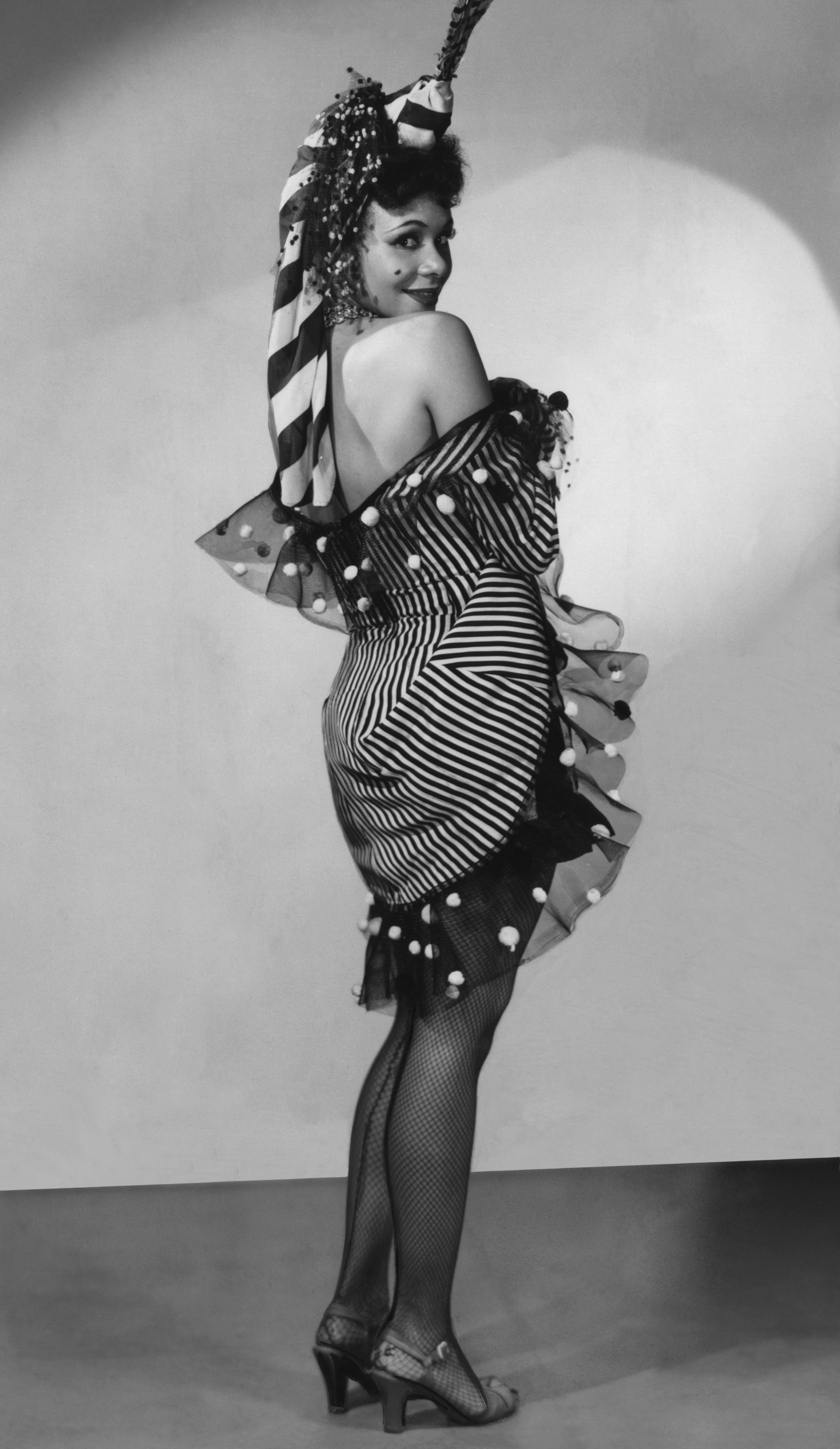
- Katherine Dunham in "Tropical Revue". October 16, 1943
  Katherine Dunham (1909–2006) trained in ballet, founded Ballet Negre in 1936 and then the Katherine Dunham Dance Company based in Chicago. In 1945, she opened a school in New York City, teaching Katherine Dunham Technique, African and Caribbean movement integrated with ballet and modern dance.
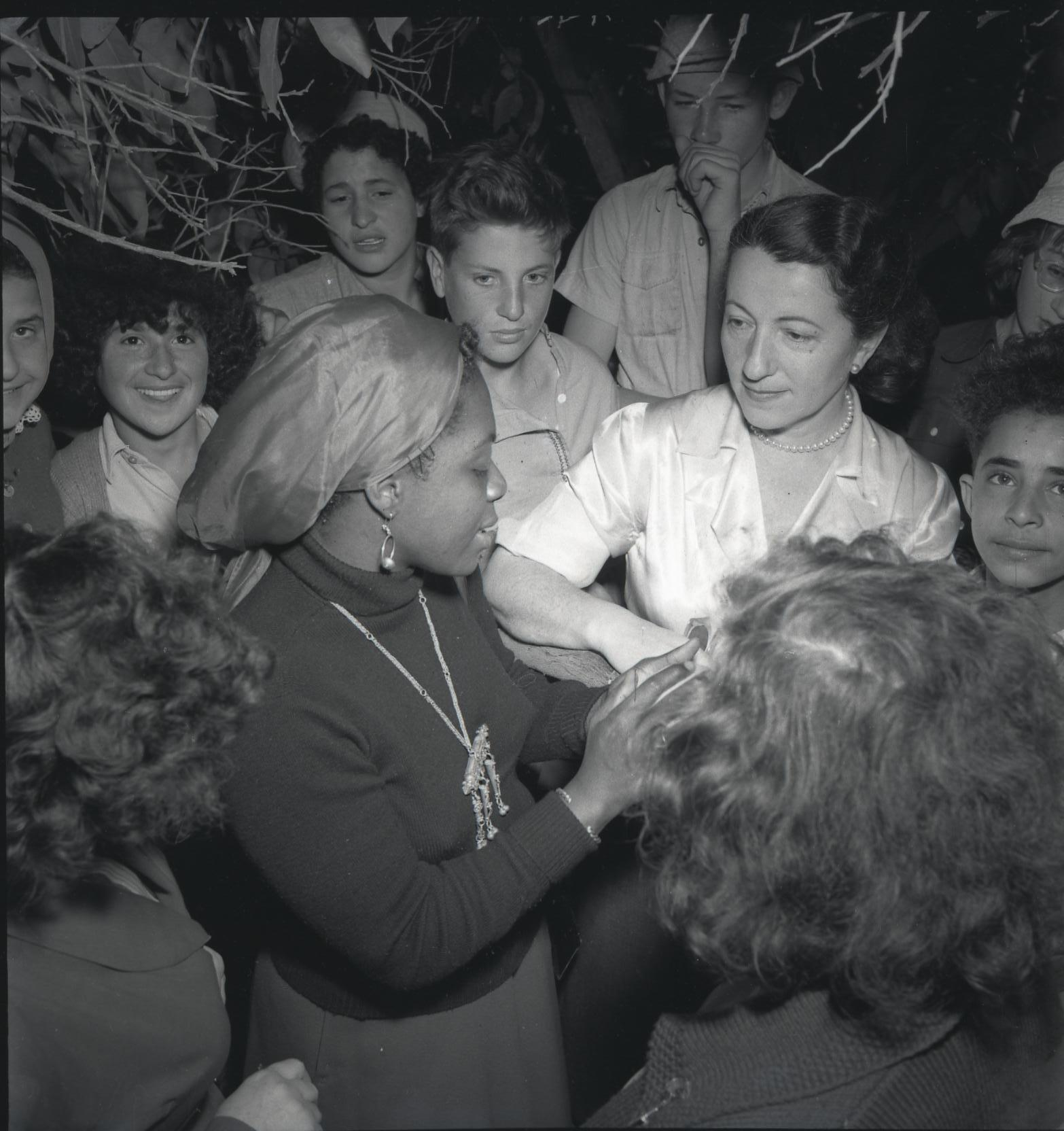
- Pearl Primus on a visit in Israel from the National Library of Israel. 1952
  Pearl Primus (1919–1994), born in Trinidad, drew on African and Caribbean dances to create strong dramatic works characterized by large leaps. She often based her dances on the work of black writers and on racial issues, such as Langston Hughes's 1944 The Negro Speaks of Rivers, and Lewis Allan's 1945 Strange Fruit (1945). Her dance company developed into the Pearl Primus Dance Language Institute.
- Alvin Ailey (1931–1989) studied under Lester Horton, Bella Lewitzky, and later Martha Graham. He spent several years working in both concert and theater dance. In 1958, Ailey and a group of young African-American dancers performed as the Alvin Ailey American Dance Theater in New York. He drew upon his "blood memories" of Texas, the blues, spirituals and gospel as inspiration. His most popular and critically acclaimed work is Revelations (1960).
- Eleo Pomare (1937–2008) was born in Colombia, but moved to New York as a child, and later founded the Eleo Pomare Dance Company. With Carole Johnson, Rod Rodgers, Gus Solomon and Pearl Reynolds, he co-founded the Association of Black Choreographers, which was the predecessor to the Modern Organization for Dance Evolvement, or MODE. His work had a profound impact on many dancers and choreographers, including Indigenous Australians.
- Carole Johnson (born 1940) danced with Pomare's company, contributed to the definition of "Black Dance", and leaves a huge legacy in Australia in the form of the NAISDA Dance College and Bangarra Dance Theatre.

== African-American sacred and liturgical dance ==
Dance was and is an integral part of West African communal religious expression. This tradition, to the extent permitted by slave holders, continued in the antebellum worship of slaves and other African Americans. One example was the ring shout in the early church. Dancing, especially as a group, became less frequent when African Americans joined more liturgical denominations such as Methodist and Catholic but was more likely maintained in Holiness, Baptist and Pentecostal churches. Individuals often rose to dance when moved to do so. Since the 1970s, liturgical dance has become more accepted as and element of worship even among Methodist and other liturgical churches. The black consciousness movement of the 1960s and 1970s as well as efforts by groups such as The Sacred Dance Guild fostered this dance form, which draws on modern dance and jazz dance. Since the late 1980s gospel mime, in which texts and lyrics are acted out, has found some acceptance in black churches.

== Genres by period ==
=== Pre-19th century ===
- Buck dance
- Patting juba
- Stick dance (African-American)
- Pigeon Wing
- Possum Walk
- Black Bottom
- Itch

=== 19th century ===
Dance genres:

- Tap dancing
- Cakewalk
- Set de flo'

=== 1920s through 1940s ===
Dance genres and moves:

- Swing
- Lindy hop
- Charleston
- Texas Tommy
- Jitterbug
- Big Apple
- One Step
- Buzzards Lope
- Suzie Q
- Camel Walk

=== 1950s ===
- Stepping
- The Bus Stop
- The Stroll

=== 1960s ===
Music genres:

- Funk
- Northern Soul
- Motown
- Rapping
- Adult African American Dance

Dances and moves:

- Set de flo'
- Monkey
- James Brown
- The Twist
- Strand
- Hand dance
- Detroit Social

=== 1970s ===
Music genres:

- Disco
- Go-go
- Hip-hop music
- Minneapolis sound
- Philadelphia soul

Dance genres and moves:

- Boogaloo
- Popping
- Locking
- The Robot
- The Worm
- Electric Slide
- Strut

=== 1980s and 1990s ===
Music genres:

- Rap (+ beatboxing)
- House music
- New jack swing
- Pop rap

Dance genres and moves:

- Break-dancing
- Hip Hop
- Moonwalk
- Hammertime
- Voguing
- Crip Walk
- Primetime
- Cabbage Patch
- Running Man
- Chicago stepping
- Detroit Ballroom
- Gangsta Walking

=== 2000s and 2010s ===
Music genres:

- Crunk
- Trap music

Dance genres and moves:

- Krumping
- Turfing
- Jerkin'
- Harlem shake (popularized in the 2000s)
- Cat Daddy
- Dougie
- Jookin
- Twerking, part of a larger set of moves unique to the New Orleans style of hip hop known as "bounce", especially post-[Hurricane Katrina after 2005]
- Dab
- Milly Rock
- Whip and Nae Nae
- Hit the Quan
- The Shmoney Dance
- Stanky Leg
- Crank That Soulja Boy

== See also ==
- African-American culture
- African-American history
- African-American music
- Dance in the United States
  - Modern dance in the United States
- Get down
- Jazz dance
- Hip-hop dance
- Street dance
- African dance
