= List of District of Columbia symbols =

Location of the District of Columbia in the United States

This is a list of symbols of the District of Columbia.

== Insignia ==
Type	Symbol	Adopted	Image	Ref.
Flag	Flag of the District of Columbia	1938	Flag of the District of Columbia	
Seal	Seal of the District of Columbia	1871	Seal of the District of Columbia	
Coat of arms	Coat of arms of the District of Columbia	1871		
Motto	Justitia omnibus (Latin for "Justice for all")	1871	—N/a	

== Species ==
Type	Symbol	Description	Adopted	Image	Ref.
Bird	Wood thrush (Hylocichla mustelina)	The Wood Thrush is a medium-sized songbird found in eastern North American forests. It has a reddish-brown head and back with a white chest covered in dark spots. The bird is famous for its beautiful, flute-like song that echoes through the woods. Wood Thrushes spend summers in the United States and southern Canada and migrate to Central America for the winter. They usually search for insects, worms, and berries on the forest floor. Their population has declined because of habitat loss and forest fragmentation.	1967	Wood thrush	
Crustacean	Hay's Spring amphipod (Stygobromus hayi)	The Stygobromus hayi is a tiny crustacean that lives underground in Washington, D.C. It looks like a small white shrimp and has no eyes because it lives in dark underground springs. This species is only found in a few areas near Rock Creek. It feeds on decaying leaves and other organic material in the water. The animal is endangered because pollution and habitat damage threaten its environment. Scientists consider it one of the rarest animals native to Washington, D.C.	2016		
Amphibian	Red-backed Salamander (Plethodon cinereu)	From the Designation Act: "a species of salamander in the class of amphibians found throughout the eastern and Appalachian regions of the United States, including in most wooded areas in the District of Columbia."	2024		
Dinosaur	Capitalsaurus	"Capitalsaurus" is the informal genus name given to a caudal (tail) vertebra belonging to a large theropod dinosaur that lived during the Early Cretaceous. It was discovered on 28 January 1898, by construction workers excavating a sewer at the intersection of First and F Streets SE. The only known specimen, it was assigned two different species designations – Creosaurus potens and Dryptosaurus potens – and eventually overturned each time. In the 1990s, the paleontologist Peter Kranz asserted that it represented a unique type of dinosaur and assigned it the name "Capitalsaurus". He successfully campaigned through local schools to make "Capitalsaurus" the official dinosaur of Washington, D.C., which became law in 1998. A year later, the district further recognized F Street at the discovery site as Capitalsaurus Court. It designated 28 January 2001, as Capitalsaurus Day.	1998		
Fish	American shad (Alosa sapidissima)	The American shad is a species of fish found along the Atlantic coast of North America. It spends most of its life in the ocean but swims into rivers to spawn. American shad are silvery fish that are related to herrings. They were an important food source in early American history and are still valued as food and sport fish today. The fish is known for being rich in omega-3 fatty acids and for its flavorful meat and roe. American shad populations have declined in some rivers because dams block their migration routes.	2016		
Flower	'American Beauty' rose (Rosa 'American Beauty')	The Rosa ‘American Beauty’ is a famous deep pink to crimson rose first bred in France in 1875. It became extremely popular in the United States and was once one of the best-selling roses in the country. The flower is known for its large, strongly scented blooms and long stems. American Beauty roses are often used as cut flowers and garden plants. The rose became a cultural symbol and appeared in music, movies, and artwork, including the film American Beauty. It is also the official flower of Washington, D.C.			
Fruit	Cherry	The Cherry is a small, round fruit that grows on trees in the genus Prunus. Cherries are usually red, dark red, or yellow when ripe and can be sweet or sour. Sweet cherries are often eaten fresh, while sour cherries are commonly used in pies, jams, and juices. Cherry trees are also known for their beautiful blossoms, especially in spring. The fruit contains vitamins, antioxidants, and natural sugars. Cherries are grown in many parts of the world, including the United States, Europe, and Asia.	2006	Stella Cherry	
Mammal	Big Brown Bat	The Big brown bat is a large species of bat found across North America, Central America, and parts of South America. It has brown fur, broad wings, and uses echolocation to navigate and hunt at night. Big brown bats mainly eat insects such as beetles and moths, which helps control pests. During the day, they rest in caves, trees, tunnels, or buildings. Females gather in maternity colonies in spring to raise their young. Unlike some other bat species, big brown bats are fairly resistant to white-nose syndrome, a disease that has harmed many bats.	2020	Image of a Big Brown Bat	
Tree	Scarlet oak (Quercus coccinea)	The Quercus coccinea, also called the scarlet oak, is a large oak tree native to the eastern United States. It is best known for its bright scarlet-red leaves in autumn. The tree grows in dry, sandy, and acidic soils and can reach heights of around 60 to 80 feet. Scarlet oaks produce acorns that provide food for birds, squirrels, deer, and other wildlife. The wood is commonly used for flooring, furniture, and cabinetry. It is also planted as an ornamental tree because of its colorful fall foliage and broad shade canopy.	1960		

== Geology ==
Type	Symbol	Description	Adopted	Image	Ref.
Rock	Potomac bluestone	Potomac bluestone is a metamorphic rock that has been used extensively in the construction of the District of Columbia. It was used as the foundation of the White House, U.S. Capitol, and Washington Monument. Many old houses in the Northwest quadrant, notably the Old Stone House, are constructed out of the rock.	2014		

== Culture ==
Type	Symbol	Description	Adopted	Image	Ref.
Beverage	Rickey	At the place of origin of the cocktail, Jack Evans, a city councillor, and Eleanor Holmes Norton, the House delegate for the district, unveiled a plaque honoring the Rickey. It was proclaimed "Washington, D.C.'s native cocktail". July was also declared as Rickey Month in the district. Various news outlets subsequently described the Rickey as the city's official cocktail.	2011		
Dance	Hand dancing	Hand dancing is a form of swing dance that is derived from the Lindy Hop and the jitterbug. It is characterized by coordinated footwork, spins, and traveling, where the dance partners communicate moves using hand-based connection. Residents of the District of Columbia invented the dance form in the 1950s, but it fell out of favor in the disco era. A Smithsonian Institution exhibit declaring the dance a national art form led to its resurgence in the 1990s.	1999		
March	"Our Nation's Capitol" by Anthony A. Mitchell	In 1959, Anthony A. Mitchell (pictured), the assistant conductor for the U.S. Navy Band, wrote "Our Nation's Capitol". Robert Enoch McLaughlin, the president of the Board of Commissioners declared it the district's official march in 1961, saying to The Washington Post, "I found it so stirring that for the first time since I left the Naval Academy, I felt like marching." Words were added later by Dixon Redditt.	1961		
Music	Go-go	Go-go music, a type of funk music with an emphasis on rhythmic patterns and melodic call-and-response sessions, originated within the district's African-American community during the mid-1960s to late-1970s. Chuck Brown (pictured), considered the "godfather of go-go", described it as music with a groovy beat that just "goes and goes", coining the name. Strict curfew laws from the 1980s that targeted youth who attend go-go clubs caused the culture to suffer. Upon recognizing the music as an official symbol, the D.C. Council repealed the curfew laws and required the mayor to develop a preservation plan.	2020		
Song	"Washington" by Jimmie Dodd		1951		

== See also ==
- Outline of the District of Columbia
