= Swing (dance) =

Group of dances tied to jazz

Swing dance
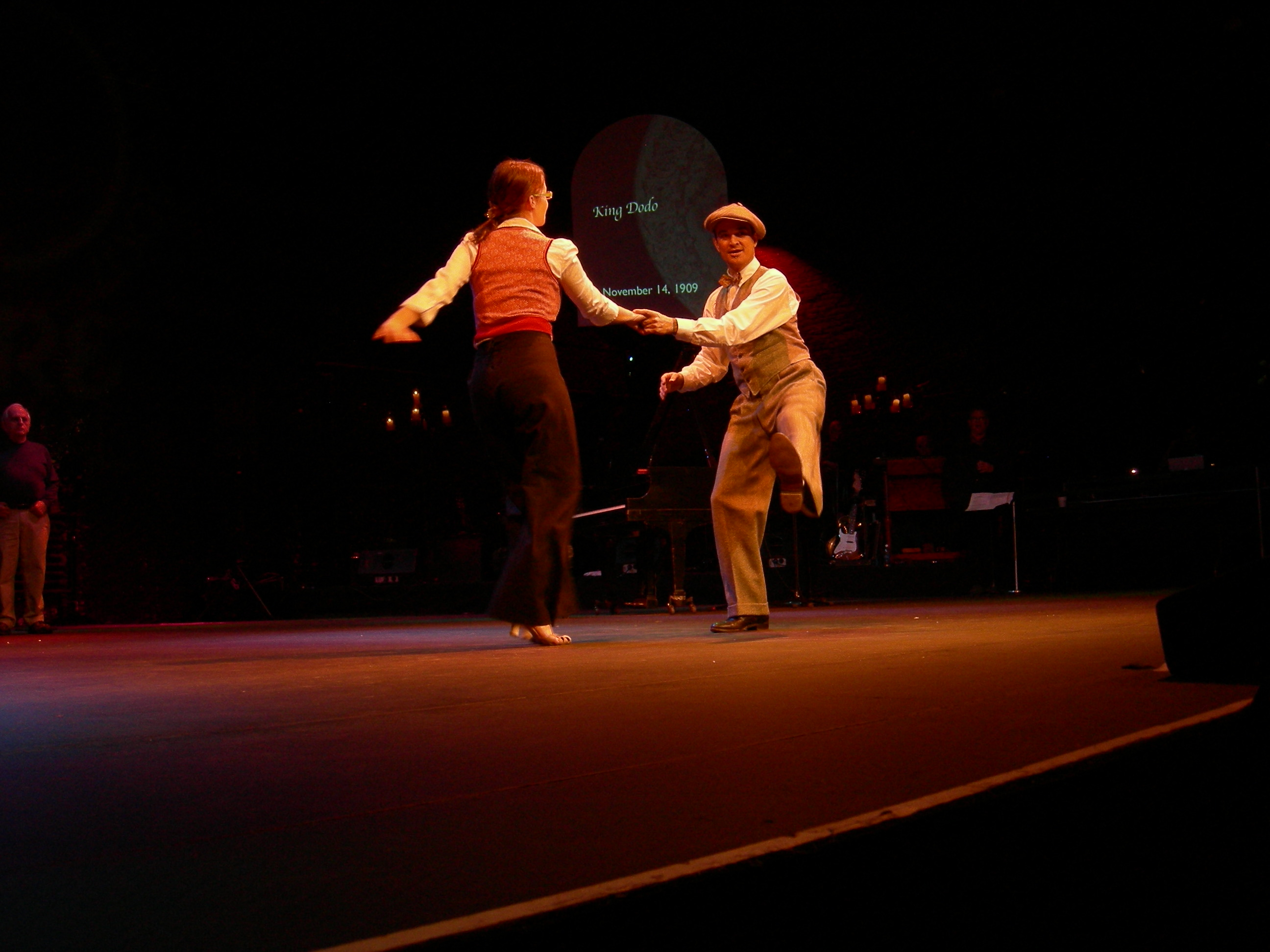
- Peter Loggins and Mia Goldsmith swing dancing at the Moore Theatre, Seattle, Washington.
- Genre: Jazz
- Origin: 1920s, Harlem, New York City, U.S.

Evita and Michael at 2011 Catalina Swing Dance Festival

Swing dance is a category of social dances that developed with the swing style of jazz music in the 1920s–1940s, with the origin of each dance predating the swing era. Hundreds of styles of swing dancing were developed; those that have survived beyond that era include Charleston, Balboa, Lindy Hop, West Coast Swing, and Collegiate Shag. Today, the best-known of these dances is the Lindy Hop, which originated in Harlem in the early 1930s. While the majority of swing dances began in African-American communities as vernacular African-American dances, some influenced swing-era dances, such as Balboa, that developed outside of these communities.

Swing dance was not commonly used to identify a group of dances until the second half of the 20th century. Historically, the word swing referred to a style of jazz music, which inspired the evolution of the dance. Jitterbug is any form of swing dance, though it is often used as a synonym for the six-count derivative of Lindy Hop called "East Coast Swing". One who danced swing was called a swing dancer. Jitterbug might refer to Lindy Hop, Shag, or other swing dances. The term was famously associated with swing era band leader Cab Calloway because, as he put it, the dancers "look like a bunch of jitterbugs out there on the floor" due to their fast, often bouncy movements. The term swing dancing is often extended to include West Coast Swing, Carolina Shag, East Coast Swing, Hand Dancing, Jive, Rock and Roll, Modern Jive, and other dances developed during the 1940s and later. A strong tradition of social and competitive boogie woogie and Rock 'n' Roll in Europe add these dances to their local swing dance cultures.

== Original forms dating from the 1920s and early 1930s ==
- Balboa is a very fast eight-count dance in closed position. The earliest form of the dance (often called "Pure Balboa") evolved in the mostly conservative dance halls of southern California where space was limited and strict codes of conduct were enforced. These dance halls usually prohibited the wild kicks of the Charleston and Lindy Hop. Pure Balboa is characterized by an upright posture with partners standing chest to chest. Step variations generally play with the rhythm or look and feel (style) from below the knee downwards and deal with changes in direction. Balboa is frequently danced to fast jazz, usually 180-320 beats per minute (BPM), though many like a slower (170-190 BPM) tempo. While most dancers differentiate between pure Balboa and Bal-Swing, both are considered to be a part of the dance. Bal-Swing evolved from Balboa when original Balboa dancers experimented with fancier variations of the dance which forced the chest to chest connection to be broken. In this form of Balboa a variety of spins, turns, dips, tricks, and even air steps are introduced.
- Charleston (dance) is danced partnered or solo, often to faster music. It includes a number of positions, including side-by-side, hand-to-hand, and tandem. In "jockey position", the closed position is opened out so that both partners may face forward, without breaking apart. In side-by-side Charleston, partners open the closed position entirely, so that their only points of connection are at their touching hips and arm contact, wherein the leader's right hand and arm touch the follower's back and the follower's left hand and arm touch the leader's shoulder and arm. Both partners then swing their free arms as they would in solo Charleston. In both jockey and side-by-side Charleston, the leader steps back onto their left foot, while the follower steps back onto their right. In tandem Charleston, one partner stands in front of the other (usually the follower, though the arrangement may vary), both face in the same direction to start, and both begin by stepping back onto the left foot. The partner behind holds the front partner's hands, and their joined arms swing backwards and forwards, as in the basic step.
- Collegiate Shag (or "Shag") is done primarily to up tempo swing and sometimes pre-swing jazz music (185–200+ BPM). It is believed that the dance originated in the Carolinas in the 1920s, later spreading across the United States during the 1930s. The shag is still danced today by swing dance enthusiasts worldwide. Shag is believed to have been the first and most popular swing dance of the original swing era
- Lindy Hop evolved in the early 1930s. It is a dance of African American origin characterized by a high degree of physical vigor. It is characterized by an eight-count basic, the "swingout", that transitions from open position through closed position and back. It has an emphasis on improvisation and the ability to include other steps in eight-count and six-count rhythms. The name "Lindy Hop" is often attributed to "Shorty" George Snowden during an interaction with a newspaper writer who asked him what kind of dance they were doing. Because Charles Lindbergh had just made his famous solo flight across the Atlantic Ocean, Shorty George is said to have replied, "the Lindy Hop." Whether it was Shorty George who coined the name is disputed by some writers, but, in any case, the name stuck. The Savoy Ballroom in Harlem was the home of the Lindy Hop. As its popularity increased, professional troupes were formed. These troupes toured the United States and Europe performing versions of the Lindy Hop.

== Forms dating from the late 1930s and early 1940s ==
- Big Apple: A partner dance and a "called" circle dance that originated in the Afro-American community of the United States in the beginning of the 20th century. The dance that eventually became known as the Big Apple is speculated to have been created in the early 1930s by African-American youth dancing at the Big Apple Club, which was at the former House of Peace Synagogue on Park Street in Columbia, South Carolina. The synagogue was converted into a black juke joint called the "Big Apple Night Club".
- Little Apple: This dance was a partnered version of the Big Apple, which is also believed to have originated in the Carolinas of the Southern United States.
- St. Louis shag (or "Shag"): A dance that evolved out of the Charleston. As its name suggests, it is recognized as having started in St. Louis, Missouri. St. Louis Shag features a stationary eight-count basic that is most commonly composed of triple-step, kick, triple-step, kick. It is a very fast closed position dance that is usually done to stomp, jump, and boogie-woogie music.

== Derivatives of swing dance ==
- Acrobatic Rock'n'Roll – Popular in Europe, acrobatic rock'n'roll is popularly associated with Russian gymnasts who took up the dance, though it is popular throughout Europe today. It is a performance dance and sport rather than a social dance, though there are people who remove the acrobatic stunts to dance it on a social level.
- Boogie-woogie developed originally in the 1940s, with the rise of boogie woogie music. It is popular today in Europe, and was considered by some to be the European counterpart to East Coast Swing, a six-count dance standardized for the American ballroom industry. It is danced to rock music of various kinds, blues or boogie woogie music but usually not to jazz. As the dance has developed, it has also taken to eight-count variations and swing outs similar to Lindy Hop, while keeping the original boogie woogie footwork.
- East Coast Swing is a simpler six-count variation that spawned from the six-count variations of the Lindy Hop. It evolved with swing-band music of the 1940s and the work of the Arthur Murray dance studios in the 1940s. It is also known as Six-count Swing, Triple-Step Swing, or Single-Step Swing. East Coast Swing has very simple structure and footwork along with basic moves and styling. It is popular for its simple nature and is often danced to slow, medium, or fast tempo jazz, blues, or rock and roll. Occasionally, Rockabilly, aka Rock-a-billy, is mistaken for East Coast Swing, but Rockabilly is more closely related to Western Swing.
- Carolina Shag was danced along the strands between Myrtle Beach, South Carolina, and Wilmington, North Carolina, during the 1940s but, during the 1990s and later, has expanded to many other places. It is most often associated with beach music, which refers to songs that are rhythm-and-blues-based and, according to Bo Bryan, a noted shag historian and resident of Beaufort County, is a term that was coined at Carolina Beach, North Carolina.
- Imperial Swing is a cross between East Coast and West Coast Swing. Imperial Swing uses the triple step footwork from East Coast Swing, but is a slotted dance with smooth (not bouncy) foot styling from West Coast Swing. Slotted dancing was introduced to Imperial Swing in the late 1970s and has completely replaced the original dancing in the round. Imperial Swing shares the same core moves with West Coast Swing: the starter (or basic) step, the crossover or side pass, the sugar push (or patty-cake) and the whip. It started at the Club Imperial in St Louis. George Edick, who owned the club, let teenagers dance on the lower level and the swing dancers of the time taught them what was learned from their trips to the east coast. As people traveled around, they added parts of west coast, bop and Carolina shag to complement the dance and make it distinctive. "The Imperial" has elements of "East Coast", "West Coast", "Carolina Shag" and "Bop".
- Jive is a dance of International Style Ballroom dancing. It is a very upbeat dance in which the performers look to be hopping off the ground. It initially was based on Eastern swing taken to England by American Troops in World War II and evolved before becoming the now standardized form of today.
- Modern Jive (also known as LeRoc and Ceroc) developed in the 1980s, reputedly from a French form of Jive. Modern Jive is not technically of the Jive family, which typically use a six-count pattern of various combinations of walking and triple steps (Ballroom Jive – back/replace triple-triple; Swing Jive – triple-triple back/replace), etc. It is pared down to a simple box step and concentrates on the simpler forms of couple dance styling, gauged to provide a social atmosphere rather than technical aptitude. There are debates about whether it is a form of swing dancing due to lack of syncopations, rhythmic footwork variations, a static partner dynamic, and lack of swinging music, amongst the swing community at large, but they do consider themselves a style of swing.
- Push and Whip are Texas forms of swing dance developed in the 1940s and 1950s. They are slotted swing dances, danced to a wide variety of music including blues, pop, jazz, and rock and roll. Similar to West Coast Swing, they emphasize the closed position, double resistance/rock step, and lead-follow and also incorporate intricate arm work. Slow Whip is a variation on Whip/Push that is danced to slow blues music, typically 60 BPM or slower.
- Rock and Roll – Developing in the 1950s in response to rock and roll music, rock-and-roll is very popular in Australia and danced socially as well as competitively and in performances. The style has a long association with Lindy Hop in that country, as many of the earliest Lindy Hoppers in the early 1990s moved to Lindy Hop from a rock-and-roll tradition. There are ongoing debates about whether rock-and-roll constitutes swing dancing, particularly in reference to the music to which it is danced: there is some debate as to whether or not it swings.
- Skip Jive is a British variant of the Jive, popular in the 1950s and 1960s, danced to trad jazz.
- Washington Hand Dancing originated around Washington, DC in the mid-1950s, and a new generation of dancers started innovating and dancing to Motown music. From its very beginning, DC Hand-dance was referred to and called "DC Hand-Dance/Hand-Dancing", "DC Swing", "DC Style" (swing) and "fast dance" (meaning DC Hand-Dance). This is the first time a version of "swing" dance was termed "hand-dance/hand-dancing". DC Hand-Dance is characterized by very smooth footwork and movements, and close-in and intricate hand-turns, danced to a six-beat, six-count dance rhythm. The more modern footwork consists of smooth and continuous floor contact, sliding and gliding-type steps versus hopping and jumping-type steps of the older style which stylistically still held elements of its Jitterbug/Lindy Hop roots, and there are no aerials.
- West Coast Swing was developed in the 1940s, as a stylistic variation on the Los Angeles style of the Lindy Hop. It is a slotted dance and is done to a wide variety of music including: blues, rock and roll, country western, pop, hip-hop, smooth, cool jazz, R&B, and funk music.
- Western Swing has long been the name for jazz-influenced western music of the 1940s and, by extension, two-step, line dancing or swing dance done to such music. Contemporary 21st century Country Swing or dancing or "Country Western Swing Dancing" (C/W Swing) has a distinct culture, with classes and instructional videos on YouTube and DVD teaching dips, lifts, aerials and flips. It adds variations from other country dances, swing styles, salsa and more. As the name suggests, it is most often danced to country and western music.

== Swing dancing today ==
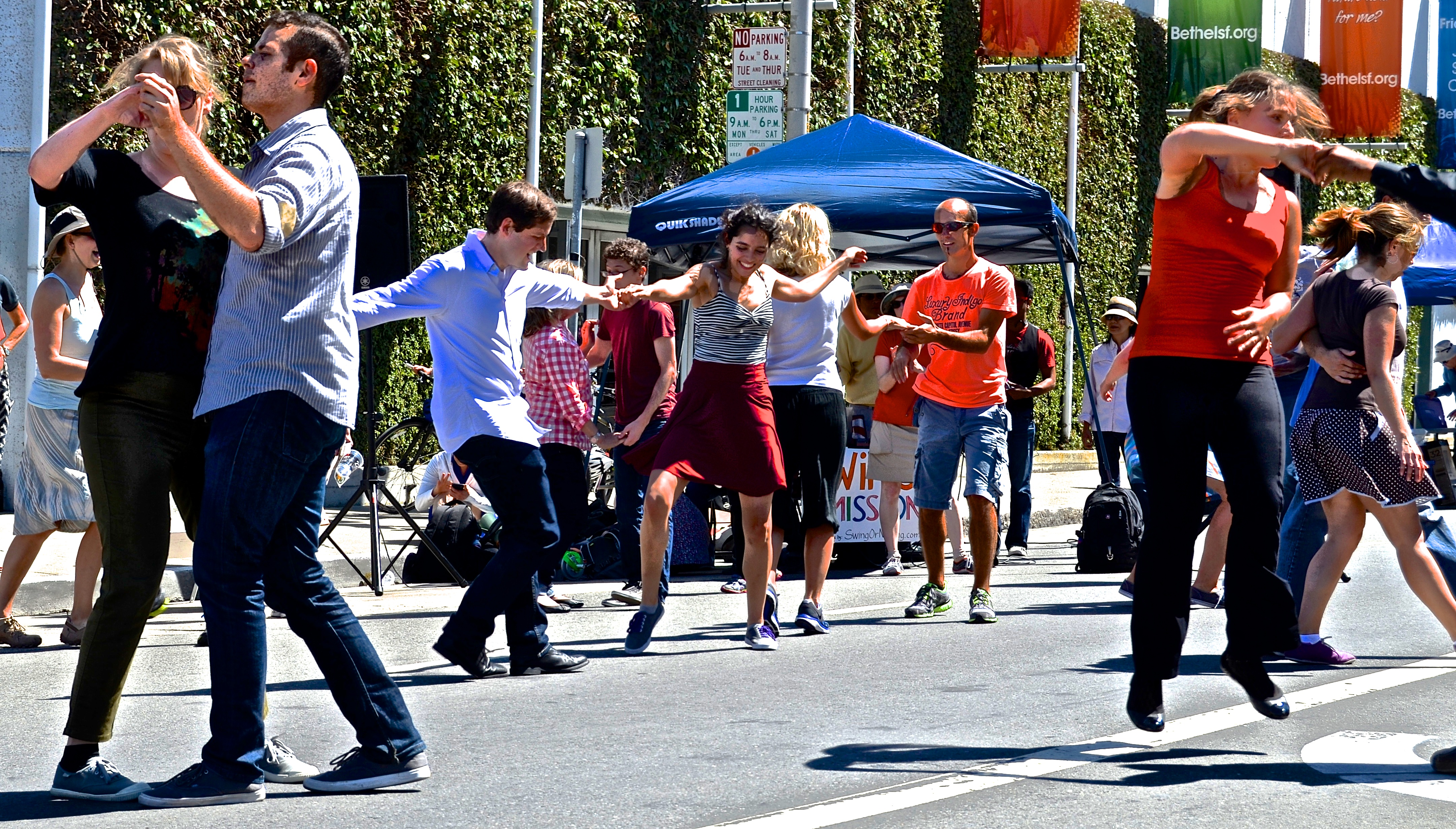
San Francisco Sunday Streets: Valencia

Swing dancing was most popular in the 1930s and 1940s, but it still continues today. Dance moves have evolved with the music. Swing dancing styles are the foundation of many other dance styles including disco and country line dancing. Swing dancing clubs and contests are still held around the world.

Swing dancing has experienced a recent revival, especially in Christian and Catholic circles. Catholic Colleges such as Benedictine and Notre Dame have large swing dance clubs that meet weekly. It has also gained traction in Popular Culture in general via Instagram reels.

The American Bop Association (ABA) is a non-profit corporation of 34 member swing dance clubs who are dedicated to the preservation and promotion of the broad range of dance and music styles more commonly known as bop, all forms of swing, jitterbug, and shag.

== Competition ==
=== Formats ===
The swing dance competitions use one of the few formats ("categories"):

- Showcase and classic are formats that are close to the ones used in ballroom dancing: pairs that had trained together perform pre-choreographed dances. Showcase format allows lifts, drops, and aerials. Classic competition allows few drops, but otherwise limits moves to the ones that can be used in social dancing.
- Strictly swing and Jack-and-Jill competitions, in contrast, demand spontaneity and lead/follow communications. Pre-choreographed dance patterns are prohibited and are penalized if discovered. Strictly swing competitions feature dance couples performing to randomly-selected music. In the Jack-and-Jill category, the couples are also randomly selected and rotated.

=== Levels ===
In West Coast Swing the competitions are divided into sections by level of experience. The levels are Newcomer, Novice, Intermediate, Advanced and All-Star. There is no official system in the United States to ensure that couples dance at the appropriate level of experience. The World Swing Dance Council holds a registry of all points attained at different levels of competition.

There is no points system for the majority of Lindy Hop competitions.

=== Judging criteria ===
Swing dancing falls under the American Rhythm category. There are several different categories at competitions depending on the type of dance.

Judging for competition is based on the three "T's" (Timing, Technique, and Teamwork) as well as showmanship.

=== Heats ===
Most competition dance floors can only hold about 12 couples dancing at a time. If the number of participants is larger than what the floor can hold, the competition will hold qualifying rounds. Once they get to 24 couples there will then be the quarterfinal round (2 separate rounds of about 12 each), then the semifinal (one round of about 12), and finally the final round (one round, usually six or seven couples).

== See also ==
- Herräng Dance Camp
- Frankie Manning
- Norma Miller
- Swing rueda

== General and cited references ==
- Callahan, Jamie L. (2005). "'Speaking a Secret Language': West Coast Swing as a Community of Practice of Informal and Incidental Learners". Research in Dance Education. 6 (1–2): 3–23. doi:10.1080/14617890500372974. ISSN 1464-7893.
