= Throwouts (dance) =

Throwouts are variations of the swing dance Balboa and are also known as Toss-outs.

The main idea is that the follower moves to arm's distance from the lead. Usually this is done from a comearound. On the 5–6, the lead lets go with his right arm, and the follow naturally moves apart. Then on count 7, the lead can begin another variation.

There are many Balboa swing out variations:

- Swing outs: On counts 7–8, the lead and follow both kick and hold, the lead brings the follow into a comearound where they close on 3–4, then release and return to open position on the 7–8.
- Outer turn: On counts 7–8, the lead brings the follow forward, but blocks on the 1, leading to and outer turn or double turn, which returns to open position on the 7.
- Follow shine: Usually the lead moves toward and around the follow on counts 7, 8, 1, and 2. In this variation the lead holds still on those counts and then does a comeaound on 3.
