= Carolina shag =

Partner dance

The Carolina shag is a partner dance done primarily to beach music (100–130+ beats per minute in 4/4 time signature). The shag is a recognized dance in modern national and international dance competitions. It became the official state dance of South Carolina in 1984 and the official popular dance of North Carolina in 2005.

== Technique ==
The basic step in Carolina shag is a six-count, eight-step pattern danced in a slot. The rhythm is similar to six-count swing in that it is triple step, triple step, rock step or counted as "one-and-two, three-and-four, five-six". Eight shag dance steps are in the basic pattern. The "one-and-two" and "three-and-four" steps should take about as much time to complete as the "five-six."

Carolina shag often bears only the faintest resemblance to other dances that share the "shag" designation.

== History ==
The term "Carolina shag" is thought to have originated along the Atlantic Ocean in Cherry Grove Beach, South Carolina during the 1940s. According to Bo Bryan, a Carolina shag historian and resident of Beaufort County, the term was coined at Carolina Beach, North Carolina. The Carolina shag is a descendant of Carolina Jitterbug, and its predecessor, Little Apple, which was the white version of the Big Apple (whose origins can be traced to Columbia, South Carolina in 1937) after whites sat (after "jumping the Jim Crow rope") in the balconies in the black clubs to watch the dancing.

== Cultural references ==
The 1989 film Shag starring Bridget Fonda, Phoebe Cates, Annabeth Gish, and Page Hannah as four high-school friends on their last road trip together before graduation, was filmed in Myrtle Beach and features the Carolina shag.

In 1997, the country music band Alabama recorded the single called "Dancin', Shaggin' on the Boulevard" referencing this style of dance and the band's own history of playing at the Carolina shore where the dance originated.

In mid- to late August 2018, SiriusXM satellite radio added a channel called Carolina Shag. It replaced a summertime channel dedicated to The Beach Boys. SiriusXM describes the channel as being "dedicated to the vintage R&B sounds that have meant Summer in the Carolinas for decades".

== See also ==
- Swing (dance)
- Collegiate shag
- St. Louis shag
- Lindy Hop
