= St. Louis shag =

Swing dance

St. Louis shag is a swing dance that evolved from the Lindy Hop, Collegiate Shag and Charleston. It is a fast, closed position dance that is usually done to stomp, jump, and boogie-woogie music.

St. Louis Shag is a territory swing dance which originated in St. Louis, Missouri in the 1930s. The dance has a stationary 8-count basic that is commonly composed of triple-step, kick, triple-step, kick. Another basic version, popularized by Kenny Wetzel, an East St. Louis native who moved to Southern California in the 1950s, is composed of triple-step, kick, step-stomp, run-run. Eddie Plunkett and Dottie Spokesfield of St. Louis had another version of the basic composed of triple-step, kick, double kick.

The dance's rhythmic variations include inside crosses (also known as over the tops), fall off the logs, and customizable stomps, kicks, taps, and holds. St. Louis Shag is often done to up-tempo swing, rock and roll, and blues music. Dancers usually transition freely between shag and jitterbug steps.

The Shag has a long history in St. Louis, first in swing, then rock and roll, jazz, jump blues, and R&B, which probably changed the dance's look and feel while preserving its characteristics. Pioneers of St. Louis Shag include 1930s and 40s-era dancers Tommy Russo, Dolores Shy, Virginia Shy, Mike Renda, Joe Renda, Eva Renda, Eddie Plunkett, Dottie Spokesfield, Jim Byrnes, and Lorraine Byrnes. Dancers from the 1950s, '60s, and beyond include Kenny Wetzel, John Bedrosian, Valerie LaFemina, Bob Brooks, and Sylvia Sykes.

== See also ==
- Carolina shag
- Collegiate shag
