= Hand dancing =

Form of swing dance from Washington, D.C.

D.C. hand dancing in Franklin Square (no audio)

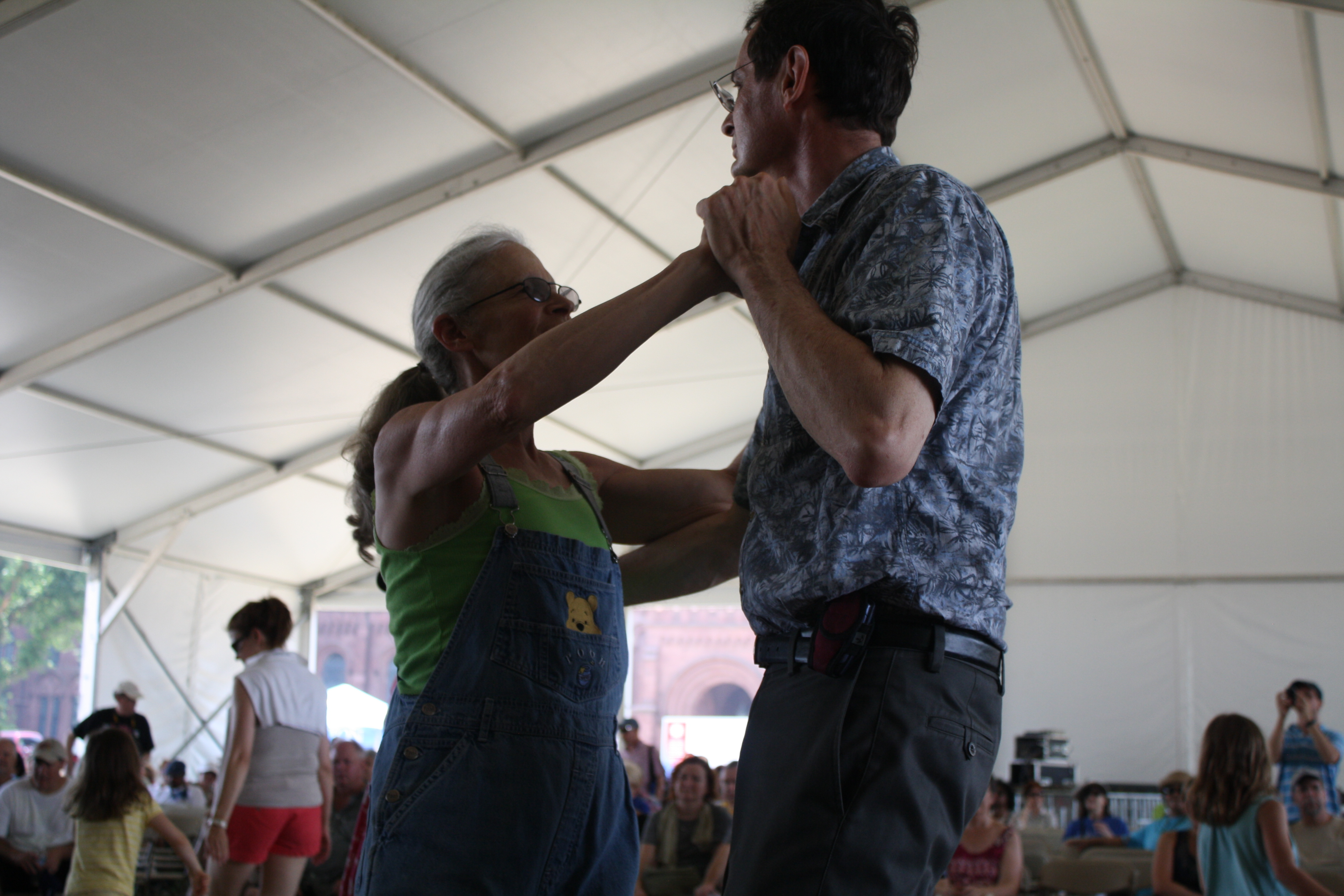
Hand dancers at the 45th Annual Smithsonian Folklife Festival in Washington, D.C., in 2011

Hand dancing, also known as D.C. hand dancing or D.C. swing, is a form of swing dance that can be traced as far back as the 1920s, from Lindy Hop and the Jitterbug, to the 1950s when dancers in the District of Columbia developed their own variety. It is characterized by gliding footwork and continuous hand connection/communication between the partners, hence its name. It fell out of favor during the disco era, but in the 1980s, Hand Dance resurfaced in the Washington dance community.

In 1993, the Smithsonian Institution recognized Hand Dance as an American Art Form, and the Smithsonian exhibit led to the establishment of the National Hand Dance Association.

In 1999 it was formally recognized as the official dance of D.C.

In 2000, the book D.C. Hand Dance: Capitol City Swing by Kim L. Frazier was published about the history, definition, philosophy, culture, structure, steps, and styles of Hand Dance. It provides discussions on etiquette, the competitive and social dance environment, the benefits of the dance, social norms, the traditional and contemporary variations.

In 2008, hand dancing was featured on the television contest So You Think You Can Dance with the auditions of contestants Markus Smith and Deonna Ball. Their performance followed a brief exposition on its history and video footage from a hand dancing party at a VFW hall in Suitland, Maryland.

On 1 January 2011, the Washington Post featured an article on Hand Dancing highlighting District of Columbia Mayor Vincent Gray's participation in the art form.

The TRI-State Connection holds an annual hand dance competition in Tyson's Corner each September.
