= Collegiate shag =

Partner dance done primarily to uptempo swing and pre-swing jazz music

The Collegiate Shag (or "Shag") is a partner dance done primarily to uptempo swing and pre-swing jazz music (185–250+ beats per minute). It belongs to the swing family of American vernacular dances that arose in the 1920s and 30s. It is believed that the dance originated within the African American community of the Carolinas in the 1920s, later spreading across the United States during the 1930s. The shag is still danced today by swing dance enthusiasts worldwide, and not to be confused with the Carolina shag, a partner dance done primarily to beach music (100–130+ beats per minute in 4/4 time signature).

== Steps ==
In the 1930s "shag" became a blanket term that signified a rather large family of jitterbug dances (swing dances) that all shared certain characteristics. The most notable of these characteristics are (1) a pulse that is consistently held up high on the balls of the feet (a.k.a. a "bounce" or "hop" to match every beat in the music) and (2) footwork with kicks that reach full extension on the off-beat (even beats) rather than the on-beats (odd beats) as with most other dances that were popular at the time. Dance instructors from the swing era often grouped the different shags into three rhythmic categories: single rhythm, double rhythm, and triple rhythm shag. The different names are intended to denote the number of 'slow' steps (e.g., a step, hop combination) performed during each basic. The slow steps were then followed by two 'quick' steps (e.g., a step, step combination).

Today, shag enthusiasts and swing dance historians also recognize an additional shag rhythm that has come to be known as "long double-shag". This rhythmic variation is identical to double-shag except that it has four quick steps rather than two. It has been traced to Charlotte, NC, at least as far back as 1936, where it co-existed with the triple and single-rhythm variations. It is commonly believed that double-rhythm shag evolved somewhat later than the others, originating in either New York or New Jersey in the mid-1930s. And, though double-shag is the most popular form of collegiate shag today, single-rhythm shag is believed to have been the dominant rhythmic pattern during the swing era.

Described below is double-rhythm shag, which uses a "slow, slow, quick, quick" pattern. Unlike the other three rhythmic patterns, which all have eight or sixteen counts in their basic, the double-rhythm basic has six counts.

The basic step is danced in a face-to-face ("closed") but offset position (i.e., the lead and follow are chest to chest, but their orientation to one another is offset in such a way that the feet are not toe-to-toe but alternate like the teeth of a zipper). Partners stand close, with the lead's right hand positioned on the follow's back. The follow's left arm then rests either on the lead's shoulder or draped around their neck.

It was also common for partners to have an exaggerated hand-hold (i.e., the way the lead's left hand and arm are positioned as he holds the follow's right hand) where the arms are held high in the air. Depending upon the height of each partner, the couple may have their arms pointed straight up. This was not always practised, but it is understood to be one of shag's distinctive features. Some dancers prefer to hold the arms much lower, similar to conventional ballroom positioning. Finally, the follow's footwork usually mirrors the lead's.

Note: Step (in the description below) is defined as: a weight shift to the opposite foot while hopping (this is usually minimal; almost more of a slide than a literal hop). Hop is defined as: a lift-and-plant motion on the same foot. The planted foot is the foot with the dancer's weight on it.

- The Shag Basic: (from the lead's point of view) Beat 1: STEP onto left foot, beat 2: HOP on left, beat 3: STEP onto right foot, beat 4: HOP on right, beat 5: STEP onto left foot, and beat 6: STEP onto right foot. The movement during beats 5 and 6 is often described as a shuffling motion. As mentioned above, this is usually broken down verbally as "slow, slow; quick, quick" where the 'slows' cover two beats (or 'counts') each and the 'quicks' mark a single beat (or 'count') each. Hence, for the lead this would be two counts with the weight on the left leg while the right leg moves, two counts with weight on the right leg while the left leg moves, followed by a quick step onto the left and then a quick step onto the right. The follow's movement would be the exact opposite.
- Cross Kicks: (done with the partners positioned side-by-side) the same movement as the basic but where the non-planted foot kicks on each slow, and where the quick-quicks are done with one foot behind the other (in tandem).
- Breaks (a.k.a. Shag Dips): A step and hold action where the non-planted leg is extended fully and the planted leg is bent underneath the dancer for support (hop onto left, leaving out the step; hop onto right, leave out the step; step left and step right)
- The Basic Shag Turn: it is customary for most turns in shag to be executed on counts 5 and 6 (i.e., the quicks-quicks). The most common turn is executed from closed position on the last two beats of the basic (5–6) with the follow traveling clockwise. The lead executes this by using their right hand (on the follows back) to lead the follow to turn on counts 5 and 6. Partners then return to closed position on the first count of the next basic. [Apache (a.k.a. "Texas Tommy") turns are also common in shag.]

== Name ==
"Shag" itself (when used in reference to American social dances) is a very broad term used to denote a number dances that originated in the first half of the 20th century. To call the dance "collegiate shag" was not as common during the swing era of the 1930s and 40sas it is today, but when the "collegiate" portion was tacked on (as it was with other vernacular dances of the time) it was meant to indicate the style of the dance that was popular amongst the college crowd.

The identification of a particular variant as 'collegiate' probably had its roots in a trend that sprang up in the mid-1920s, where collegiate variations of popular dances began to emerge. These included dances like the collegiate Charleston, collegiate rumba, collegiate one-step, collegiate fox trot, etc. These forms employed hops, leaps, kicks, stamps, stomps, break-away movements, and shuffling steps. The name "collegiate shag" became somewhat standard in the latter part of the 20th century (see swing revival), presumably because it helped to distinguish the dance from other American vernacular dances that share the "shag" designation. Carolina shag, which evolved from a dance called the Little Apple, and St. Louis shag, which is believed to have been an outgrowth of the Charleston, both adopted the name shag—though neither one of them is directly related to the Collegiate shag that's the focus of this article.

== History ==
Shag's origins are not very clear. Descriptions of the dance in literature from the time period suggest it began in the American South as a 'street dance', meaning it did not initially evolve as part of the curriculum taught by a dance master or in a dance studio. Nevertheless, a particular version of the shag was eventually adopted by the Arthur Murray studios where it was standardized in the late 1930s.

Publications from the era testify to shag's popularity throughout the country during the 1930s. Despite its enormous popularity, the dance itself wasn't universally known by the name "shag", which only makes tracing its origins more difficult. Arthur Murray's book Let's Dance reports that shag was known throughout the United States under various names, like "flea hop". By the late 1930s there were arguably a hundred or more stylistic variations of the dance.

In the 1935 book entitled Textbook of Social Dancing, Lucielle and Agnes Marsh say that, "At the most exclusive Charleston Colonial Ball we found the debutantes and cadets doing what they call the Shag. This is a daring little hop and kick with sudden lunges and shuffling turns. As we followed our survey through the South we found the same little, quick hop, skip, and jump under the names of Fenarly Hop and Florida Hop. Through the West the same steps could be traced under the names of [the] Collegiate, Balboa, and Dime Jig." A New York writer sent to Oklahoma in late 1940 noted an "...Oklahoma version of shag done to the western swing music of Bob Wills and his Texas Playboys at the Cain's Dancing Academy in Tulsa."

The earliest known reference to a dance called "shag" can be found in a book entitled The Land of the Golden River by Lewis Philip Hall, published in 1975. In this book, the author claims to have invented a dance he named "the shag" in 1927. Hall tells us that he and his dance partner introduced the dance at the second annual Feast of Pirates festival in Wilmington, N.C. in 1928. But there is reason to believe that what Hall and his partner came up with was not the same dance that became so popular amongst the swing dance circles of the late 1930s and 40s.

As the section above points out, the naming practices of the time were often inconsistent. Two dances with the same name may not necessarily share the same origin story or even look alike. Carolina shag and St Louis shag, two dances that both became popular in the late 1940s and 50s, provide a perfect example of this complication. Both came to be called "shag", though they have very different origin stories. So, although it is possible that the dance that Lewis Hall and his partner invented somehow gave rise to the shag of the swing era (i.e., what we call "collegiate shag" today), this possibility could also be granted to a number of other seemingly unrelated dances from the late 1920s or early 1930s, some of which might not have even been called shag.

Like Charleston (dance) and Big Apple (dance), the shag originated among African Americans in the 1920s, where again, it may or may not have actually been called "shag". Even the step 'invented' by Lewis Philip Hall was, according to author Susan Block, "...mostly gleaned from African American dances...".

It has also been suggested that the dance evolved from a partnered version of the solo Vaudeville/tap step called "flea hop", which featured a movement pattern that's very similar to shag [Citation Pending]. This view may be strengthened by the fact that, in the late 19th century, "shagger" was a nickname for 'Vaudeville performer'. Perhaps this Vaudeville slang was what inspired Lewis Hall to give his dance the name "shag".

== See also ==
- Swing (dance)
- Carolina shag
- St. Louis shag
- Dance move
