= Buzzard lope =

Type of dance

The Buzzard Lope is a traditional Southern States dance. It was first noted in Georgia in the 1880s, and became widely popular in Minstrel Show repertoire, alongside the cakewalk and juba dance.

It seems to have originated in African American slave communities, possibly as an adaptation of a similar West African dance. Dancers stretch out their arms like birds of prey and do a shuffle step and a little hop around a piece of cloth on the ground, which represents the carrion. People on the sidelines clap and pat their thighs.

It has also been said to be a representation of "a turkey buzzard getting ready to eat a dead Mule (some report a Cow)", performed with a comic sensibility known as hokum.

Reference is made to the dance in the penultimate line of the American blues/folk song "Johnny Brown":

Little Johnny Brown, spread your comfort down (2x)
Fold one corner, Johnny Brown
Fold another corner, Johnny Brown (3x)
Take it to your lover, Johnny Brown (2x)
Show her your motion, Johnny Brown (2x)
Lope like a buzzard, Johnny Brown (2x)
Give it to your lover, Johnny Brown (2x)
