= Stick dance (African-American) =

Slavery era dance created by African-Americans

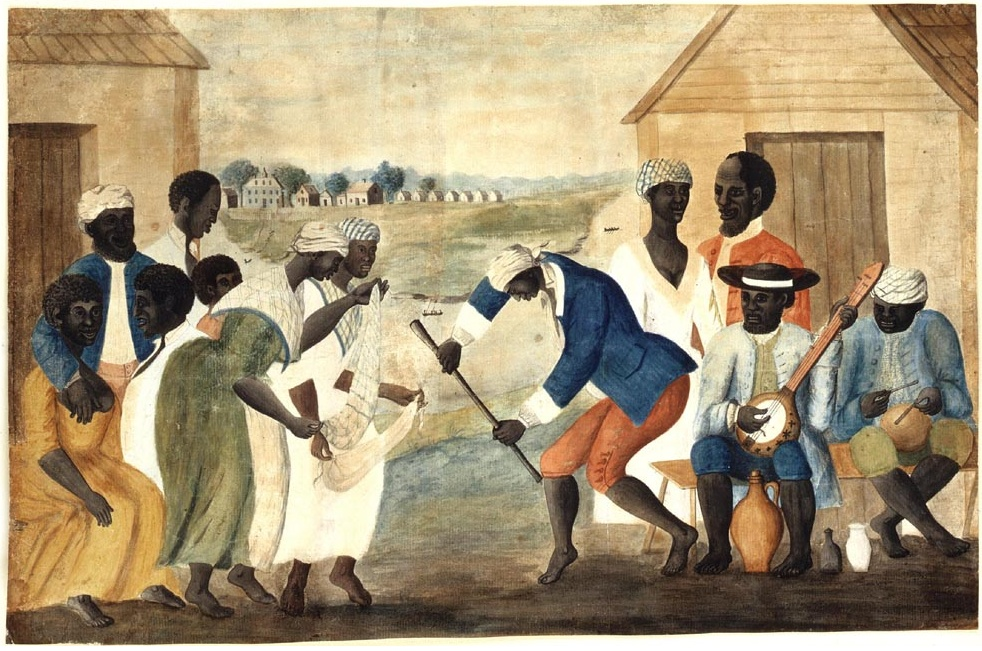
The Old Plantation, a watercolour painting from the 1780s, showing a slave performing a stick dance on a South Carolina plantation.

Stick dance was a dance style that African–Americans developed on American plantations during the slavery era, where dancing was used to practice "military drills" among the slaves, where the stick used in the dance was in fact a disguised weapon.

== Origins ==
To add to the dance element of the practise, other slaves would gather around the competitive fighters. They would clap in rhythm, and sing in a call-and-response style, while one caller led the rest of the crowd.

Like the banjo and other instruments, the berimbau was based on African instruments and developed by African-American slaves. An early depiction of slaves performing a stick dance is an 18th-century watercolour painting called The Old Plantation, which is in the collections of The Abby Aldrich Rockefeller Folk Art Museum in Williamsburg, Virginia. It shows a dozen African-Americans gather in front of two slave cabins, with one stick dancer, and two women dancing with scarves to music of a drummer and a banjoist. The watercolour is believed to have been made of a plantation between Columbia and Orangeburg, South Carolina.

== Minstrel stick dances ==
The stick dance became a standard part of the minstrel shows performed by African-Americans during the late 19th century. It had an element of humour, where the dancer would shuffle onto the stage dressed as an elderly African-American man using a cane, and then suddenly use the cane to perform energetic acrobatic capoeira dance moves.

== See also ==
- Cakewalk
- Set de flo'
- Patting juba
- Maculelê (stick dance)
- Weapon dance
