= Cabbage Patch (dance) =

Type of dance

The Cabbage Patch is a hip-hop dance move that involves moving one's clenched fists together in front of the body in a horizontal, circular motion. The hips may be gyrated in sync with these arm movements.

The dance became popular in the 1980s, showing up in many dance clubs in North America. The dance's name is derived from the Cabbage Patch Kids dolls or the use of "cabbage" as slang for paper money. The dance was originally celebratory and often associated with being cool.

Several songs about the dance have been released:

- Rare Item & the Bud Buddies – "The Cabbage Patch Dance" (1983)
- Delmar Donnell – "In the Cabbage Patch" (1984)
- Experience Unlimited – "Doing the Cabbage Patch" (1986)
- XII – "Cabbage Patch" (1986)
- R.P. Cola – "The Cabbage Patch Dance" (1987)
- Gucci Crew II – "The Cabbage Patch" (1987)
- World Class Wreckin' Cru – "Cabbage Patch" (1987)

The Dance was Popularized In 2025 by the Indie Game DELTARUNE
