= Bo Bryan =

Southern writer, novelist

Bo Bryan (born October 17, 1948) is a Southern writer, novelist, best known for nonfiction, a regional bestseller SHAG, The Legendary Dance of the South. SHAG won awards for design and content. Bryan's novel, Bitsty Nickel Might Have AIDS, generated controversy in the early 1990s. The novel was optioned for film. Bryan abruptly departed the Southern literary scene in 1997. He is known to have produced a quantity of work since then but has published nothing in recent years.

== Early life ==
Born George Waller Bryan, Junior, the author writes under his family nickname “Bo”. He was raised in Myrtle Beach, South Carolina, a seaside resort and carnival town. Bryan's writing often explores the vacation mentality, the desire for escape from ordinary life, the temporary disregard of ordinary morality and its consequences.

Bryan's ultra-conservative family was instrumental in founding and developing Myrtle Beach, which Bryan finds ironic, given the libertine nature of many amusements found there. His locally legendary grandfather was a carnival boss and village tycoon. His father, a lawyer and no less a local legend, prosecuted war criminals in Germany after WWII. George Waller Bryan, Senior (nicknamed “Buster”) went on to develop real estate, a hotel, and several golf courses, including the famed The Dunes Club. Buster Bryan was considered visionary for packaging golf course greens fees and hotel accommodations, attracting tens of thousands of new customers to Myrtle Beach. Bo Bryan was expected to follow in the footsteps.

Southern literature dictates that family legends shall be the prison of heirs apparent. Bo Bryan failed to meet expectations. A below average student, he struggled with dyslexia. Sent to remedial reading camps, he made slight progress. His father's disappointment carried over; expectations remained unchanged. Bryan rebelled, then escaped. In high school, he developed a gambling habit, playing poker obsessively. After graduation, he dropped out of college and traveled as a professional gambler. Upon the sudden death of his father from bronchial pneumonia, Bryan quit gambling and joined the Army. Bryan found that he loved to march, was a crack shot with an M-16, joined the drill team, and graduated first in his class at Leader School. He did not go to Vietnam. Released from service, he traveled, learning to crew on oceangoing sailboats. Telling verbal stories of his adventures, he began construction of his own legend.

== Writing career ==
Bryan began writing at the University of North Carolina, Chapel Hill in 1971. Creative writing teachers Max Steele, Doris Betts, and William Blackburn allowed Bryan to audit classes. Having no foundation in the reader's experience of literature, he judged himself illiterate. His teachers considered his condition advantageous to discovery of a unique literary voice. Dyslexia, long a handicap, was suddenly a catalyst for passion. Bryan became a constant reader. To writing he gave years learning sentence structure trial and error, gaining a feel for the architecture of paragraphs, finally realizing stories of his own.

His novel, Bitsy Nickle Might Have AIDS, published in 1991, captures a moment of collision between leftover Southern Victorian morality and the post-modern sexual revolution. The book predates and strangely foretells of the Monica Lewinsky affair. Bitsy Nickle is rife with political satire and black comedy relevant to heterosexual transmission of HIV in the early years of the AIDS epidemic. The book was instantly controversial. Bryan was invited to speak at college campuses and private school auditoriums in the Bible Belt. While admonishing young people to protect themselves sexually, he challenged local politicians to set a good example by being publicly tested for AIDS; often elected officials invited him to leave town. Bitsy Nickle Might Have AIDS was optioned for film.

Bryan's second book SHAG, The Legendary Dance of the South', released in 1995, is accurate history recounted as prose poetry, the true story of the first social dance conceived in performance with rock n roll music. Before the twist, before the watusi, the frug, and the swim, in 1943, ten years before Elvis Presley, came the shag dance, a unique, fast-footed, smooth, cool derivation of the jitterbug. The shag became a Southern tradition, today recognized as the official state dance of both North and South Carolina. S

== Renewed career ==
Bryan began publishing again with journalism for charities, writing a series of newspaper articles and Internet copy to promote Project Amazonas, a group he joined on medical expeditions servicing primitive villages along the Amazon River. He wrote and produced a film to raise funds for a new hospital ship.

Back in Myrtle Beach, journalism covering homeless students attending his high school alma mater initiated an outpouring of community support, raising tens-of-thousands of donations in a matter of days. Bryan continued to organize and write for homeless students, helping to found Hope House of Myrtle Beach, a charity that nurtures and provides for the immediate needs of homeless high school students.
