= Suzie Q (dance move) =

Dance step

The Suzie Q (also Susie Q, Suzy Q or Susy Q) is a dance step in the Big Apple, Lindy Hop, Salsa, and other dances. In line dances this step is also known as heel twist (actually refers to step 2) or grind walk. The step is also used in jazz dance, and in Salsa shines.

The step originated from a novelty dance of the 1930s with the same name addressed in the 1936 song Doin' the Suzie-Q by Lil Hardin Armstrong.

== Name origin ==
The origin of the name "Suzie Q" is uncertain.

- An obituary published in The Salt Lake Tribune on September 21, 2008, for Susie Jane Dwyer (maiden name Quealy) (April 24, 1915 – September 17, 2008) of San Francisco makes the claim that "The popular song hit of the era, 'Doin' the Susie Q' was written in her honor."
- A December 12, 1936 news story claimed that the Suzie Q dance was introduced by two dancers from Georgia. The dancers had previously performed and introduced the dance at Syracuse, New York, but the audience misheard “Syracuse” as “Susie-Q.”

== The step ==
The feet perform alternating cross steps and side steps with swivel action, as follows.

- On 1, put the right foot on the heel across the left foot and put the weight on this heel, the toe being on the floor.
- On 2, swivel on the heel, the right toe swinging to the right, while doing a small step by the left foot to the side, almost in place or simply transferring the weight onto the left foot, or stepping slightly back.

Step 1 may also be accompanied with a light swivel of the left toe.

One may continue in one of the ways:

- Repeat steps 1 and 2 several times.
- or
  - On 3, step with the right foot to the right.
  - On 4, bring the left foot together or step across the right foot.
  - repeat steps 1, 2, 3, 4.
- or (change of direction)
  - On 3, step with the right foot to the right.
  - On 4, do nothing.
  - 5, 6, 7, 8 do any of the three patterns from the opposite foot.

=== Partnered Suzy Qs ===
In Lindy Hop, Suzy Qs can be performed by couples, either facing each other in open position, or side by side.
