= House of Peace Synagogue =

- U.S. National Register of Historic Places
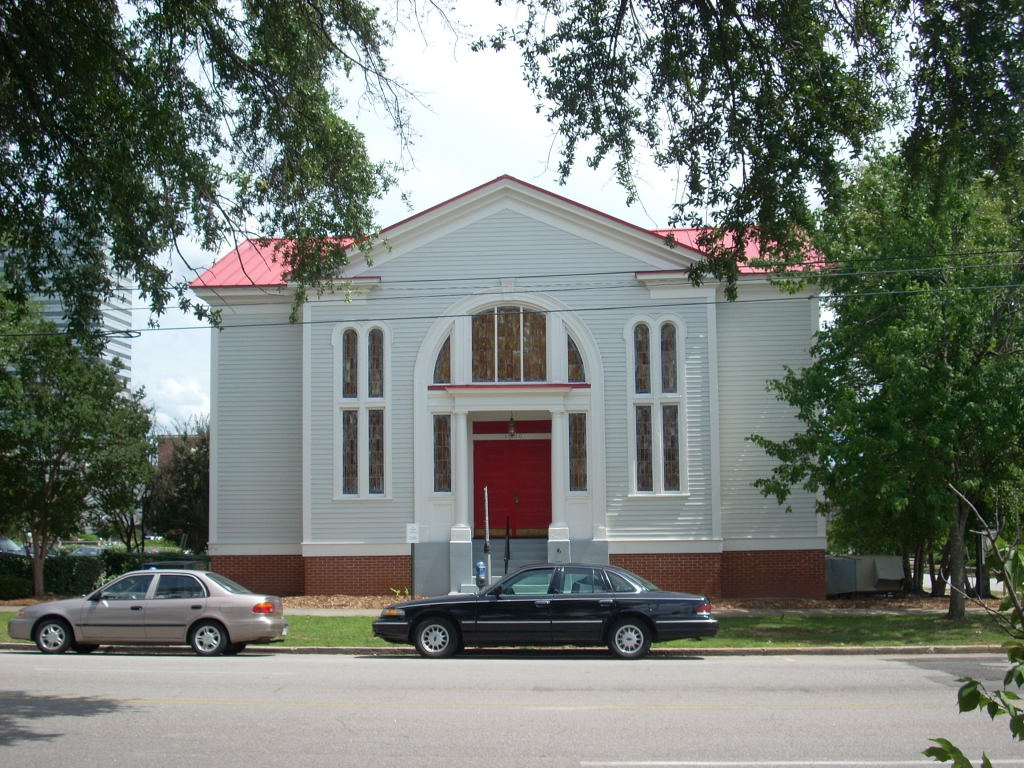
- House of Peace Synagogue

- Location within South Carolina Location within the United States
- Location: 1000 Hampton Street, Columbia, South Carolina
- Coordinates: 34°0′15″N 81°2′18″W
- Built: 1915
- MPS: Columbia MRA
- NRHP reference No.: 79003354
- Added to NRHP: August 28, 1979

The House of Peace Synagogue is a former synagogue of the Beth Shalom Congregation in Columbia, South Carolina. It was originally located at 1318 Park Street. After the congregation moved in the 1935, the building was used for the Big Apple Club, which was an African-American night club. It was named to the National Register of Historic Places on August 28, 1979. In the early 1980s, the building was moved to its present location at the southeast corner of Hampton and Park Streets. In 1993, it was purchased by the Historic Columbia Foundation and is called the Big Apple.

== History ==
The first Jewish congregation in Columbia, Sharit Israel, met on Assembly Street. Their building was destroyed in the burning of Columbia in the Civil War. The Jewish community diminished after the war until Eastern European immigrants arrived later in the century. In 1896, the Reform Tree of Life synagogue was built. Because of religious differences, the Orthodox Jews in Columbia separated. In 1907, the Orthodox minyan met at a house at Park and Lady Streets that served as their first synagogue. They received a state charter in 1912. This first synagogue was destroyed in a fire in 1915. The new synagogue was built at the site. By the late 1920s, they had outgrown this facility. They moved to their third synagogue on 1719 Marion Street in early 1935. The congregation's synagogue is now at 5827 North Trenholm Road.

The second synagogue on Park Street was then used for the African-American night club called the Big Apple Club. At the club, a dance craze, which was named the Big Apple, was popularized. Students from the University of South Carolina, who paid to watch from a balcony, learned the dance steps. Some of these students took the dance to the Roxy Club in New York in 1937. From there, the dance was briefly popular across the country.

After its use as a night club, the building was used by various commercial establishments. At the time of the preparation of the National Register of Historic Places nomination, it was used by a heating and air conditioning company. In the early 1980s, it was moved nearly two blocks to the corner of Hampton and Park Streets. In 1993, it was purchased by the Historic Columbia Foundation. It has been restored and is available for rental for special occasions.

== Architecture ==
The Big Apple building is two-story, wooden building with a metal gabled roof. At its Park Street site, it was on a raised brick basement. Built for a congregation that was largely Polish and Russian immigrants, it is an example of Eastern Jewish architecture.

The entrance to the building is in a projecting central bay. The door is flanked by wooden pilasters and sidelights under a large arch with stained glass windows. On each side of the arch is a pair of tall narrow, stained glass windows with horseshoe arches. The sides of buildings have five windows with horseshoe arches. Some of have been modified. The sides have pedimented gables with a rondelle.

The interior has central recessed dome. When it was the Big Apple Club, the dome had neon lights shaped like the crescent moon and shooting stars. There is a balcony on the front side of the building. This was the spectator's gallery during operation as the night club.
