= Balboa (dance) =

Type of swing dance

Balboa being danced competitively at Lindy Focus 2023

Balboa being danced competitively at CalBal 2025

Pure Balboa being danced competitively at CalBal 2025

The Balboa, also known as "Bal", is a swing dance that emerged in Southern California during the early 1930s as a response to swing music. The earliest recorded reference to Balboa is 1932. This date coincides with what is generally accepted to be the beginning of swing. The dance enjoyed huge popularity in California during the 1930s and 1940s, and was still being danced by original dancers into the 21st century.

Balboa is a social partner dance that distinctively relies on closed position. The earliest form of the dance emerged in the high schools and dance venues of southern California. Spaces were often limited, the floor was waxed and there was traditionally a line of dance around the room. Balboa is danced into the floor and drifts without a prescribed line of dance. Although it is not clear when, strict codes of conduct could be enforced in some venues with signs stating 'no breaks'. These dance halls were usually addressing wild kicks of other dances, specifically So Cal Swing, or simply unruly dancers. Ballrooms famous as Balboa venues displayed 'no-break' signs, with bouncers monitoring the dancers.

'Pure' Balboa is characterized by an upright posture with forward intent, and partners closely connecting (in numerous ways) at the lead's right side. The dance generates shared movement, creating many different rhythmic variations most noticeable in the feet. It is a dance built around the feeling of rhythmic movement between dancers, rather than performed movements and step patterns. The dance was so varied, that original dancers might recognise where another dancer came from based on their specific style.

Balboa is danced at any tempo, but was one swing dance that enabled dancers to reach especially high speed. While most dancers differentiate between Pure Balboa and Bal-Swing, both are considered to be a part of the range of the dance. Bal-Swing evolved when original Balboa dancers broke hold and experimented with including features of So Cal Swing dancing. In this form of Balboa, a variety of rotational and linear movements — mainly generated by 'out and in' movement — create spins, turns, dips, and occasionally tricks.

As swing became more popular, the jitterbug craze emerged and the lines between bal swing and a jitterbug style often seen in movies of that date, become blurred. Original dancers mixed many dance styles together, also creating a distinctive So Cal style.

Much footage of original Balboa dancers, such as the Hignetts, the Thompsons, the Rafterys, the Takiers and the Steinbroners dancing at Bobby McGees can be found online.

== History ==
Balboa emerged in Southern California during the early 1930s. Balboa is named after the Balboa Peninsula in Newport Beach, California, where the method of dancing was first recognised as a distinctive new dancing style known to be danced consistently by large numbers of dancers. But like any dance style it may have also emerged in other SoCal communities for the same reasons as part of a general change in popular dancing amongst young people caused by a change in popular music. In later years, a newspaper article connected to the redevelopment of the Balboa Pavillion ( which had been completely refitted with historic woodwork) made claim to the Pavillion as the home of Balboa. Other recollections of original dancers and Balboa residents attribute the origins to the Rendezvous Ballroom, and unnamed individuals. Yet more reports record different explanations. All of which indicate that there may have been no specific moment of invention, rather an evolution.

An earlier dance, of no similarity, was also named 'The Balboa'. It was created for the Panama Californian Exhibition, Balboa Park, 1915-17, with illustrated instructions published in newspapers.

Balboa dancing continued in California throughout the twentieth century and developed a number of variations which differ from the original style specifically when newer dancers and dance teachers tried to learn the dance in various ways without the benefit of the kind of recorded instructions that exist for ballroom dances. In approximately 2005, a concerted effort was made to invite original dancers to share their knowledge resulting in another range of interpretations, and discoveries.

In 1978, two long-time Balboa dancers Ed and Inez Thompson met their Balboa-dancing friends Hal and Marge Takier to discuss starting a twice-a-month Balboa dance on Sunday afternoons at a Bobby McGee's restaurant/ nightclub in Newport. The club ran at several Bobby McGee's locations, including Newport, Long Beach and La Brea, for four decades, and still continues as a social dance using Bobby McGee's name. . restaurant in Newport Beach. Video footage of the original dancers at Bobby McGee's became highly influential in informing the Balboa dance as it is done today, with new footage constantly being discovered showing the range of the dance, previously unknown dancers and other SoCal dancing.

Alma Heaton included two pages on Balboa in his 1954 book "Ballroom Dance Rhythms", and a page of instruction in "Techniques of Teaching Ballroom Dance". Heaton described two Bal-Swing figures in 1967.

== Versions ==
- Bal-Rueda
- Bal-Sham
- Bal-Trot
- Slow Bal

== See also ==
- Collegiate shag
