= Set de flo' =

Historical African-American dance competition

Set de flo' (Set the floor) was a type of dance competition held among African Americans during the 19th century.

== Overview ==
Set de flo' dancing involves drawing a circle on the ground (usually on a dirt floor); dancers are required to not step outside the bounds of the circle, and if they did, they will be disqualified. A caller, usually a fiddler, would call out increasingly complicated dance steps, which the dancers would have to perform without a misstep. Competitors could dance solo, or as couples. The expression "set de flo'" apparently refers not to the drawing of the circle on the ground, but to a particular dance step where the dancer would stomp on the floor when they began dancing, a move that appeared to set the floor in place for the dancer. When couples competed, the man and woman would bow to one another at the start of the dance. The woman would place her hands on her hips, then her male partner would grin and roll his eyes, then they would begin dancing, it was somewhat humorous to the spectators that watch the couples dance.

Couple dances developed some common steps. For example, couple dances often began with the woman placing her foot on the knee of her male partner, and he would tie her shoelace. Strutting was an element always present in set de flo' dancing.

"Water dances" were sometimes present in set de flo'. A water dance is a dance competition during which a dancer keeps a glass or pail of water balanced on his or her head while dancing and tries not to spill the water (see Head-carrying). The Cakewalk and the Buck dance were other dances that could include water dance elements.

== Comparisons to other dance styles ==
The use of a caller to announce the dance steps is a common one in West Africa. Worshippers of Shango, the god of thunder and fire, may dance with a flaming pan balanced on top of their head. The Egbado Yoruba also have a ritual of challenging dancers by having them dance with a cup of water or a terracotta figurine balanced on their head.

The set de flo' dances evolved into other styles, such as the Cakewalk. The common moves included the ritual of a male partner tying his female partner's shoelace at the start of their dance; the award of a cake for the competition winner; and some common dance moves mimicked farm work such as hoeing or swinging a scythe.

== Competitions ==
Competitions between African-American dancers were at the core of set de flo' dancing. Of the many styles of African-American dancing during the slavery era, most were called simply "jigs" by whites, using the term for Irish dances that had a similarly strong rhythm. Poor Irish immigrants to the Carolinas introduced jig dancing to the region, and other whites saw the slave dance styles as similar. Set de flo' was among these "jig" dances. Slave owners would sometimes arrange dance contests between their slaves and slaves from other plantations. The slave owners would bet on the outcome.

Slaves, and post-slavery African-American dancers, would compete among themselves with set de flo'.

== See also ==
- Lindy hop
- Patting juba
- Stick dance (African-American)
- Tap dance
