= Juba dance =

African-American dance style known as hamboning

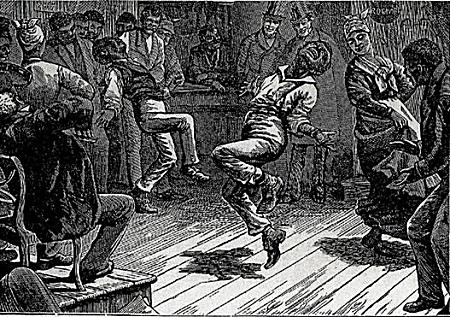
Master Juba from American Notes

The Juba dance or hambone, originally known as Pattin' Juba (Giouba, Haiti: Djouba), is an African-American style of dance that involves stomping as well as slapping and patting the arms, legs, chest, and cheeks (clapping). "Pattin' Juba" would be used to keep time for other dances during a walkaround. A Juba dance performance could include steps such as the "Yaller Cat", "Pigeon Wing" and "Blow That Candle Out". The dance traditionally ends with a step called the "Long Dog Scratch". Today, Juba's rhythm lives on in Bo Diddley's "Bo Diddley Beat" and the step-shows of African American Greek organizations.

== Etymology ==
Juba was derived from the Kikongo and Bantu word diuba, which meant "to beat (or to pat) the sun or time." Because the movement of the sun was an important element of traditional Kongo religion, it became a prominent feature of their spiritual practices. This included a sacred step dance called giouba (also spelled djouba). Thus, the Central African-inspired juba became a dance that enslaved Bakongo in the United States performed to simulate the circle of life and the spirituality of their ancestors.

== History of the dance ==
The Juba dance was brought by enslaved peoples from the Kongo to Charleston, South Carolina. It became an African-American plantation dance that was performed by slaves during their gatherings when no rhythm instruments were allowed due to fear of secret codes hidden in the drumming.

As early as the 18th century, the Juba dance was a vital means of preserving African culture and identity under the oppressive conditions of slavery. Over time, it evolved into a structured performance tradition, often accompanied by call and response chants or songs. Later in the mid-19th century, music and lyrics were added, and there were public performances of the dance. Its popularization played a significant role in the development of modern tap dance. The most famous Juba dancer was William Henry Lane, or Master Juba, one of the first black performers in the United States. It was often danced in minstrel shows, and is mentioned in songs such as "Christy's New Song" and "Juba", the latter by Nathaniel Dett.

In the 1930s and 1940s, African American composer Florence Price drew inspiration from Juba when composing her symphonies. The rhythm and structure of the dance, deeply rooted in African traditions, made its way into informal concert music connecting folk culture and classical composition.

Hambone was famously adopted and adapted in the 1950s by rhythm & blues singer Bo Diddley for his "Bo Diddley beat", which was copied by many rock musicians. Today, the remains of the Juba dance are displayed and expressed in African American performance art, examples include stepping, body percussion and contemporary dance forms that honor historical rhythm and resistance to slavery. These expressions not only preserve history but also reflect the enduring power of movement and rhythm as tools for resilience and identity across multiple generations.

== In other media ==
=== Related songs ===
"Juba Juba", a popular song about the Juba:

Juba dis and Juba dat,
and Juba killed da yellow cat, for
You sift the meal and ya gimme the husk,
you bake the bread and ya gimme the crust,
you eat the meat and ya gimme the skin,
and that's the way,
my mama's troubles begin

A song about the hambone from Step it Down (v.s.):

Hambone Hambone pat him on the shoulder
If you get a pretty girl, I'll show you how to hold her.
Hambone, Hambone, where have you been?
All 'round the world and back again.
Hambone, Hambone, what did you do?
I got a train and I fairly flew.
Hambone, Hambone where did you go?
I hopped up to Miss Lucy's door.
I asked Miss Lucy would she marry me.
(falsetto) "Well I don't care if Papa don't care!"
First come in was Mister Snake,
He crawled all over that wedding cake.
Next walked in was Mister Tick,
He ate so much it made him sick.
Next walked in was Mister Coon,
We asked him to sing us a wedding tune,
Now Ham-....
Now Ham....

== See also ==
- Charleston (dance)
- Clogging
- Hand jive
- Jig
- Jive (dance)
- Master Juba
- Minstrel show
- Set de flo'
- Step dance
- Stick dance (African-American)
- Tap dance
- Schuhplattler
