= Big Apple (dance) =

Partner and circle dance

The Big Apple being danced in Denver, Colorado, in 2024

The Big Apple is both a partner dance and a circle dance that originated in the Afro-American community of the United States in the beginning of the 20th century.

== History ==
=== Origin (1860–1936) ===
The exact origin of the Big Apple is unclear but one author suggests that the dance originated from the "ring shout", a group dance associated with religious observances that was founded before 1860 by African Americans on plantations in South Carolina and Georgia. The ring shout is described as a dance with "counterclockwise circling and high arm gestures" that resembled the Big Apple. It is still practiced today in small populations of the southern United States.

The dance that eventually became known as the Big Apple is speculated to have been created in the early 1930s by African-American youth dancing at the Big Apple Club, which was at the former House of Peace Synagogue on Park Street in Columbia, South Carolina. The synagogue was converted into a black juke joint called the "Big Apple Night Club".

In 1936, three white students from the University of South Carolina – Billy Spivey, Donald Davis, and Harold "Goo-Goo" Wiles – heard the music coming from the juke joint as they were driving by. Even though it was very unusual for whites to go into a black club, the three asked the club's owner, Frank "Fat Sam" Boyd, if they could enter. Skip Davis, the son of Donald Davis, said that "Fat Sam made two conditions. They had to pay twenty five cents each and they had to sit in the balcony." During the next few months, the white students brought more friends to the night club to watch the black dancers. The white students became so fascinated with the dance that, in order to prevent the music from stopping, they would toss coins down to the black dancers below them when the dancers ran out of money. "We had a lot of nickels with us because it took a nickel to play a song. If the music stopped and the people on the floor didn't have any money, we didn't get any more dancing. We had to feed the Nickelodeon", recalls Harold E. Ross, who often visited the club and was 18 years old at the time.

The white dancers eventually called the dance the black dancers did the "Big Apple", after the night club where they first saw it. Ross commented that "We always did the best we could to imitate the steps we saw. But we called it the Little Apple. We didn't feel like we should copy the Big Apple, so we called it that."

=== Rise in popularity (1937–38) ===
During the summer of 1937, the students from the University of South Carolina started dancing the Big Apple at the Pavilion in Myrtle Beach. Betty Wood (née Henderson), a dancer who helped revive the Big Apple in the 1990s, first saw the dance there, and six months later she won a dance contest and become nicknamed "Big Apple Betty." The news of the new dance craze spread to New York, and a New York talent agent, Gae Foster, traveled to the Carolinas to audition dancers for a show at the Roxy Theater, the world's second-largest theater at that time. Eight couples were chosen for the show, including Wood, Spivey, and Davis, to perform the Big Apple during a three-week engagement that began on September 3, 1937. They performed six shows a day to sold-out audiences and greatly contributed to the dance's popularity. After the engagement at the Roxy, the group became known as "Billy Spivey's Big Apple Dancers" and toured the country for six months.

Arthur Murray, a dance instructor and entrepreneur who had 128 dance studios occupying three floors in New York in 1936 saw the Big Apple dancers at the Roxy in September 1937 and incorporated the Big Apple into his swing dance syllabus. Due to the popularity of the Big Apple and other popular dances such as the Conga, Murray began offering franchises in 1937. By 1938, there were franchises in several major cities, including Detroit, Cleveland, Atlanta, Louisville, and Minneapolis. The company continued to grow to over 200 Arthur Murray dance studios throughout the world by 2003.

In the fall of 1937, four couples from Whitey's Lindy Hoppers, a Lindy Hop performance group based at the Savoy Ballroom in Harlem, New York, traveled to Hollywood, California, to perform a Lindy Hop sequence for a Judy Garland movie called Everybody Sing (1938). Soon after arriving in California, Herbert "Whitey" White, the manager for the group, sent a telegram to Frankie Manning, the lead dancer for the group, about the new dance craze in New York City called the Big Apple. Manning had never seen the dance before but based on the description of the dance in the telegram, he choreographed a Big Apple routine for the group. Since the dance was based on combining jazz steps that the Lindy hoppers were already familiar with, such as Truckin', the Suzie-Q, and Boogies, the group quickly learned the new steps. They performed their Big Apple routine for Everybody Sing, but the dance scene was eventually cut due to a dispute between the director and Whitey over the dance group's not receiving a break in the filming schedule.

When the group returned to Harlem, Manning taught his Big Apple version to other dancers in Whitey's Lindy Hoppers, before ever having seen the version done by the Big Apple dancers at the Roxy. Whitey's Lindy Hoppers would dance the Big Apple mixed with Lindy Hop at the Savoy Ballroom until interest in the dance died out. Later in 1939, the group performed a Big Apple sequence for the movie Keep Punching, which has been recreated by Lindy Hop performance groups since the 1990s.

By the end of 1937, the Big Apple had become a national dance craze. On December 20, 1937, Life featured the Big Apple in a four-page photo spread and the magazine predicted that 1937 would be remembered as the year of the Big Apple.

=== References in popular culture ===
The dance is mentioned in the Frank Capra film You Can't Take It with You (1938). In the film Jimmy Stewart and his fiancée, played by Jean Arthur, are enticed to learn the dance by some youngsters for the payment of a dime. The children have a sign "Learn the 'Big Apple' 10 cents." The lesson is broken up by the arrival of a policeman on foot. The children and the adults all leave. In the scene that follows, Mr. Stewart and Ms. Arthur show up at a swanky party not realizing that the sign has become attached to the back of Ms. Arthur's dress.

In the movie Vivacious Lady (1938) Ginger Rogers and James Ellison teach some moves from the dance to Beulah Bondi. These include Suzie Q and Praise Allah.

In the 1938 variety show anthology film The Big Broadcast of 1938, Bob Hope tells a joke about "a little schoolboy that used to take a big apple to the teacher, and now he takes the teacher to the Big Apple." When the audience groans, he laughs lamely and says, "The Big Apple's a dance."

A notorious December 1937 radio broadcast by Mae West, condemned as "vulgar and indecent" by the Federal Communications Commission, featured an Adam and Eve sketch in which Eve (played by West) asks the Snake in the Garden of Eden to fetch her some forbidden fruit: "Now, get me a big one -- I feel like doin' a Big Apple!" The studio audience laughed, briefly applauding the reference.

=== Popularity continues ===
In the spring of 1938, Whitey's Lindy Hoppers performed the Big Apple at the Roxy Theater during a three-week engagement. A theatrical producer, Harry Howard, saw their show and hired the group to perform for Hollywood Hotel Revue, a production that would tour New Zealand and Australia. The group was billed as "The 8 Big Apple Dancers" or similar variations, and consisted of four couples that included Frankie Manning. They were the only black performers in the production that lasted from August 1938 until spring 1939.

Some claim that New York City's nickname, the Big Apple, came from the dance. However, that theory has been discredited (see The Nickname of New York).

There are also accounts that a new variation developed called the "Little Apple." This form involved fewer dancers and people would take it in turns to grab a partner and move to the center of the circle and dance for a while in styles similar to the Lindy Hop, Shag, or other dances of the era.

=== Decline in popularity (1939–41) ===
The dance reached international popularity by 1939. Jeff Wilkinson claims that "even British Prime Minister Winston Churchill was doing the dance." However, this may have been the dance's undoing. Wilkinson speculates that the dance decreased in popularity when "it was adopted by the old folks." Jitterbugging was also increasing in popularity, and by 1941 the Big Apple was a past fad that had been replaced by the Jitterbug

=== Revival (1980s–90s) ===
In the 1980s, Lance Benishek and Betty Wood started to tour the US and Europe teaching the Big Apple. The 50th anniversary of the dance was celebrated in 1988 in Columbia, South Carolina, the location where it all started.

== Related dances ==
The Big Apple has many commonalities with Afro-American vernacular partner dances of the early part of the century through the 1930s and '40s. Dances such as the Cakewalk, Black Bottom, Charleston, and Lindy Hop share both similar elements and a common underlying improvisational spirit.

== Moves ==
The moves are frequently used in Lindy Hop. This is also used as a warm up before Lindy Hop classes. Note that the moves are very 8-count centered, like tap dance. That is, they almost all start on count 8.

Susie Q Right: Both feet are placed together facing the center of the circle. Left hand clasps the right (think "synergy"), both heels scoot to the right, then both toes 4 slow, 8 quick. Typically "reverse" is then called and you go back the other way. 8 counts each way.

Susie Q left: this is the 'Susie Q' that most Lindy Hoppers know. Left foot starts over right hand should be 90 degrees (like a forklift), palms down, wrists may pull hands up arms swing left to right. Twist left heel while right foot steps out and to the left, repeat. "reverse" goes the other way. Same timing as Susie Q right (slow, slow, slow, slow, quick, quick, quick, quick, quick, quick, quick, quick).

Apple Jacks: With feet close together take tiny steps in place. When stepping with the right foot, let the right knee cross in front of the left knee, twisting hips to the left. With upper body bend down, with fingers pointed at the floor, twisting shoulders opposite hips. On the next step reverse the direction of knees, hips, shoulders. Each step is one count.

Break a Leg:

Break Step: The break step is an 8 count pattern that starts on 8 and is usually done on the last 8 counts of a phrase. The most famous break is the TOBA break. There is also a half break, with only takes up 4 counts consisting of a step with one foot, step with the other foot (sometimes described as "run run" because of the flavor and speed of the steps) kick ball change.

London Bridge:

Shout: Open arms wide.

Swivels: Swivels while walking.

Spank the Baby: Step out with left foot, bring right foot together, meanwhile raising the left arm in the air and making a spanking motion toward one's own behind with the right hand. Spank the baby is done while walking in a circle (not around the circle).

Tick Tock: Put heels together with weight on the back of one foot and the front of the other, then shift toes together and the heels apart and alternate the weight on the feet and repeat the actions to create a sideways travelling motion while at the same time the forearms move in front of the torso then out to the sides in time with the shifting of the feet.

Truckin: Truckin is a shuffle step variation popularized after the vaudeville era. The right hand is held up (as in a right turn signal) with the index finger extended and wagging. In Harlem Truckin the shoulder is set back. Feet are parallel at all times. With both feet together and facing slight left the right foot scoopes down and brushes the floor, the left foot is then gathered at the right ankle and the right heel twists (this should cause forward movement as the foot scoopes past the other foot). The action is repeated creating a "hearts in the snow" effect from the overlapping steps. At the same time the left hand is placed over the stomach (like a waiter holding a towel) and never really moves. The stomach twistes with the feet therefore, the "stomach rubs the hand". If truckin is being done around a circle the outside hand is always up.

Pose and Peck: Put hands on hips, and do pecking with head.

Scarecrow: First 4 counts are Charleston basic. Second 4 counts, put upper arms straight out to side, and let forearms dangle loosely, and tilt head to side. Often the feet are slightly apart, with the knees drooping together.

Shorty George: Named for George Snowden. Walk a straight line using very small steps. Keep upper body upright while dramatically bending knees. With each step, let the opposite knee push toward the back of the knee of the leading foot, causing both knees to shift right when stepping with right foot and shift left when stepping with left foot. Shoulders alternate, pushing down toward the leading foot, so that when the knees are pushed to the right, the right shoulder sinks downward and the left shoulder becomes raised. Each step is one count.

Little Peach: Touch the side of your nose twice, once with your left hand and once with your right.

Hitch Hike:

Boogie Back: Lean forward and bend knees. Clap hands on the even counts and hop backwards on the odd counts.

Boogie Forward: Straighten up and throw hands in the air. Each step starts from forward roll the hip, which then moves to the side and settles back as the step with the other foot begins. Each step is two counts.

Praises: The traditional ending the big apple. Everyone runs to the center of the circle and shouts "Hallelujah" while throwing hands in the air from a bent over posture. It may also be called just "Hallelujah".

Rusty Dusty: Hold pant legs up and shake the dust out of them.

Charleston: See solo Charleston moves. This move is actually called "Big apple swing".

Fall Off the Log: Kick right leg to the side, then step behind with your right foot, out with your left foot, and in place with your right foot. Repeat this on the left side.
