= History of Lindy Hop =

History of dance genre

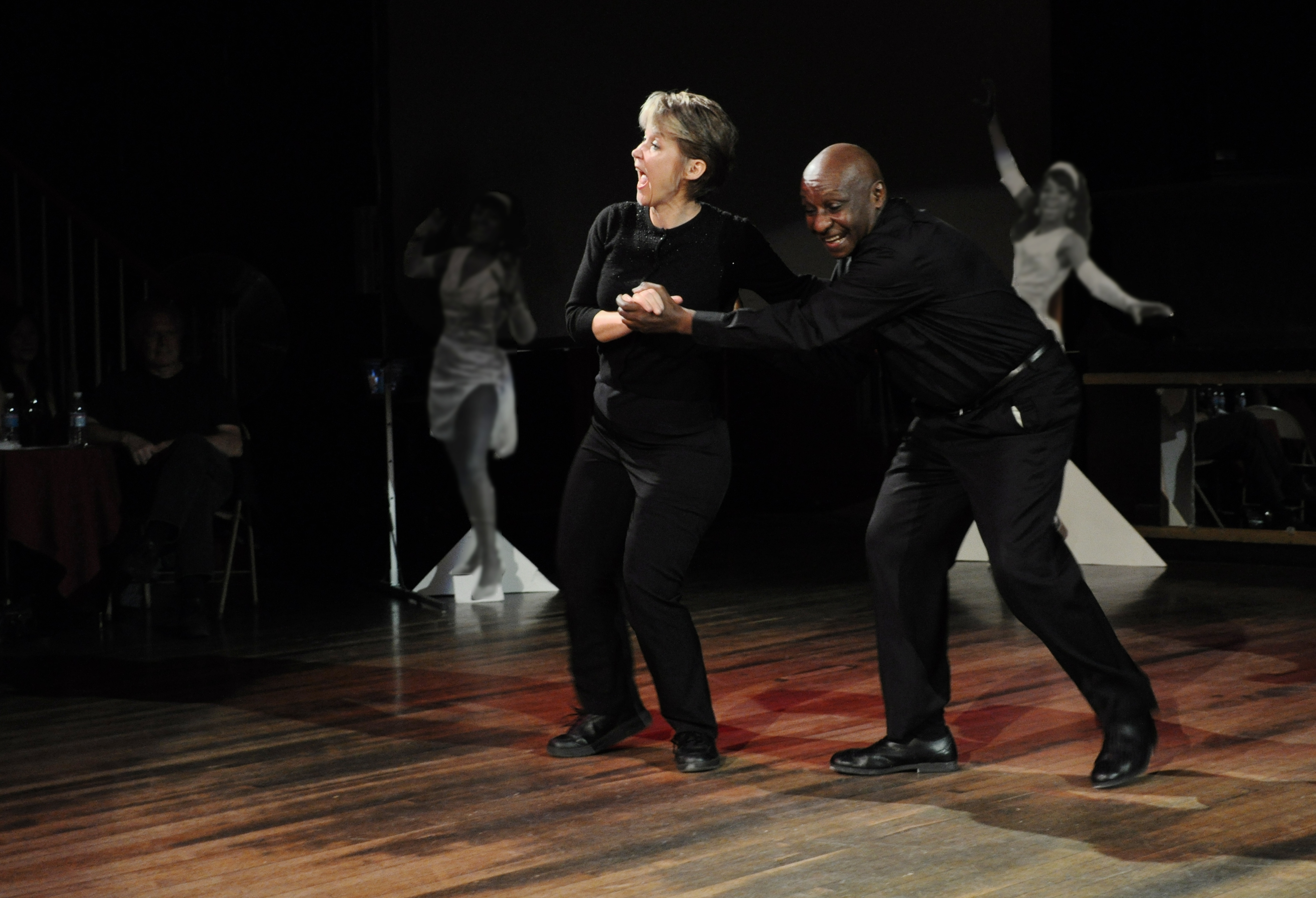
Christine Sampson dancing with Chazz Young 2009

The history of Lindy Hop begins in the African American communities of Harlem, New York during the late 1920s in conjunction with swing jazz. Lindy Hop is closely related to earlier African American vernacular dances but quickly gained its own fame through dancers in films, performances, competitions, and professional dance troupes. It became especially popular in the 1930s with the upsurge of aerials. The popularity of Lindy Hop declined after World War II, and it converted to other forms of dancing, but it never disappeared during the decades between the 1940s and the 1980s until European and American dancers revived it starting from the beginning of the 1980s.

== Early influences (1900s–1920s) ==
Lindy Hop combined a number of dances popular in the United States in the 1920s and earlier, many of which developed in African American communities. Just as jazz music emerged as a dominant art form that could absorb and integrate other forms of music, Lindy Hop could absorb and integrate other forms of dance. This hybridity is characteristic of vernacular dances, in which forms and steps are adapted and developed to suit the social and cultural needs of its participants in everyday spaces. Therefore, Lindy Hop was not originally the creative or economic project of formal dance academies or institutions.

Lindy Hop's genealogy can be seen in the ideological themes, social uses, and steps that it has absorbed during its development. For many Lindy Hop historians, the Charleston is Lindy Hop's most influential predecessor, and Lindy Hop's basic footwork and timing reflects that of the Charleston. The transition from Charleston to Lindy Hop was facilitated by the Breakaway, a partner dance which introduced the 'Swing out' and 'open position' of dances such as the Texas Tommy to the 'closed position' and footwork of partnered Charleston. As jazz music in the late 1920s changed, so did jazz dances, including the Lindy Hop. The swung note of swinging jazz encouraged dancers to introduce a 'delay' in their timing which influenced the execution of footwork and approaches to tempo within Charleston and Breakaway.

This change in jazz music in the late 1920s can be slightly accredited to the Lindy Hop. After being introduced to the public in 1928 for the first time, the dance started to lead to changes in jazz. Dancers wanted to add more moves, speed, and overall athleticism to their dances that current songs couldn't allow. Musicians answered this request from dancers and in doing so intensified the rhythmic drive of their songs to accommodate this newly requested athleticism. This new system created a mutual feedback loop between dancers and musicians that helped lead the charge in the changes to jazz music, at least in the beginning.

== Classic era (1927 to 1936) ==
=== Harlem and Its Renaissance ===
The Savoy Ballroom was the first integrated ballroom in the country, and the New York Renaissance of the 1920s raised the profile of African American vernacular culture in white communities within the United States, particularly in New York City. The popularity of African American dance and music fed what became a fascination with the somewhat illicit nature of the ghetto area. In 1937, white patronage in the area brought much-needed income to the bars, clubs, and theaters of Harlem, as well as work for black artists in a city increasingly belabored by economic depression.

Upper and middle class white audiences were exposed to Harlem's working class entertainment, at first through white audiences attending black venues and shows in Harlem, but later through traveling shows, popular music, and cinema. This prompted a mainstream thirst for "black" cultural forms. However, by the time dances such as the Lindy Hop reached mainstream white audiences, they had often been reworked by white teachers and film studios to accord with the aesthetics and social values of white mainstream America. White dancers in Hollywood films played pivotal roles in popularizing Lindy Hop.

Harlem's increasing popularity as an entertainment district, as well as a vibrant creative center for African Americans in the 1920s and 1930s, brought about the creation and popularization of Lindy Hop, both in social dance spaces and on the stage.

== Origin of the Lindy Hop ==
In one account it is argued that, in the slang of the late 19th and early 20th centuries, a 'Lindy' was a young woman. There exists an unsubstantiated claim that the word "hop" was documented as early as 1913 as a term for swing dancing and was also, apparently, a term used by early Texas Tommy dancers to describe the basic move for their dance.

In a more influential (but inaccurate) account, popular legend has it that dancer "Shorty" George Snowden renamed the breakaway dance as the Lindy Hop in a dance contest. In this version, Snowden was one of the 24 couples that competed in a negro dance marathon that began on June 17, 1928 at the Manhattan Casino, a ballroom that was located at 8th Avenue and 155th Street in Harlem. During the contest, as he remembers it, Snowden decided to do a breakaway, that is, fling his partner out and improvise a few solo steps of his own. In the midst of the monotony of the marathon, the effect was electric, and even the musicians came to life... Fox Movietone News arrived to cover the marathon and decided to take a close-up of Shorty's feet. An interviewer then asked him, "What are you doing with your feet?" Snowden, without stopping, replied 'The Lindy'".^{a}

Research has shown that Snowden's account of the naming of the Lindy Hop in the Rockland Palace (the Manhattan Casino which was renamed at the time of the marathon) is likely not true because the term 'lindy hop' in connection with the Harlem Lindy Hop was used for the first time in public in September 1928, which is more than two months after Snowden and his partner Mattie Purnell supposedly named the dance in the dance marathon. The time gap between the dance marathon and the first use of the term in public does not make sense if Snowden really named the dance in the dance marathon.

Though there does not exist proper evidence for the naming of the Lindy Hop, there exists evidence for inventing the Lindy Hop in the dance marathon in which Snowden and Purnell participated and devised the basic principle of the Lindy Hop.

Whether Snowden intended it or not, Lindy Hop was associated with Charles Lindbergh's transatlantic airplane flight, completed in 1927. "Lindy" was the aviator's nickname. The reporter interviewing Snowden apparently tied the name to Charles Lindbergh to gain publicity and further his story. While Lindbergh's trans-Atlantic flight may or may not have inspired the name "Lindy Hop", the association between the aviator, George Snowden and the dance continues in Lindy Hop folklore. Te Roy Williams and His Orchestra recorded the song "Lindbergh Hop," written by Ted Nixon and Elmer Snowden, on May 25, 1927. The Memphis Jug Band on 9/13/1928 recorded "Lindberg Hop (Overseas stomp)," written by Jab Jones and Will Shade.

Often referred to as the "first generation" of Lindy Hop, dancers such as George Snowden, Leroy "Stretch" Jones, Twistmouth George and Edith Matthews inspired many other dancers and troupes (including Frankie Manning) to take up Lindy Hop. Twistmouth George and Matthews are credited with inventing the "twist" that characterises the first few steps of the follower's footwork in the Swingout. By the end of the classic era, Lindy Hop was danced across Harlem in ballrooms, night clubs, cabaret clubs, rent parties, apartments, and street parties — almost anywhere people came together with music to dance.

== Aerials era (1935 to 1941) ==
In 1935 Lindy Hop—with swing music—had become increasingly popular throughout America, attributable in part to the success of musicians such as Artie Shaw, Benny Goodman, Count Basie, Cab Calloway, and Chick Webb.

Ballrooms across the United States hosted the big bands of the day, with Chick Webb leading one of the most popular at the Savoy Ballroom. It was with his orchestra that the teenage Ella Fitzgerald first gained fame. These ballrooms continued a national tradition of sponsoring contests where dancers invented, tested and displayed new steps for prizes. At first, lindy hoppers were banned because they took more space than other dancers and often kicked nearby couples. The Savoy eventually relented and welcomed them as an attraction for other guests. As the 'Home of Happy Feet', the Savoy became the hottest ballroom in New York City, if not the world.

=== The first air steps ===
Head bouncer at the Savoy Herbert "Whitey" White (an African American man nicknamed for a white streak in his hair) managed a team of local dancers that included George Snowden. White arranged for dancers to perform at professional engagements, including parties and shows, all over the city and country. George Snowden's absence from the ballroom with these performances gave a new generation of dancers the opportunity to shine, Frankie Manning among them. With the most popular dancers returning to the Savoy between engagements, rivalries soon developed between different groups, particularly between Shorty George and his friends and newer dancers such as Manning. These rivalries were often played out in formal competitions between groups.

Since the beginning of jazz dance, acrobatics were an essential part of vernacular dance, commonly known as flash dancers who toured with bands across United States during the first part of the 20th century. The first generation of Savoy Lindy Hoppers, George Snowden's generation, introduced the early versions of air steps and acrobatics to the Lindy Hop by the very beginning of the 1930s.

Savoy Lindy Hopper Frankie Manning has claimed that he devised the first air step in the Lindy Hop. This story, however, is inaccurate. It is more accurate to say that his first air step in the Lindy Hop likely helped to develop the spectacular air step routines which Manning's generation of Savoy Lindy Hoppers, the second generation, perfected.

Manning went on to dance extensively with one of the most influential Lindy Hop troupes, the Whitey's Lindy Hoppers (also known as Whitey's Lindy Maniacs, Whyte's Hopping Maniacs, The Harlem Congaroos, The Hot Chocolates, and other names). The troupe was based at the Savoy and managed by White. They performed around the world from 1935 to 1942 at private parties and in stage shows and films; contributing to the spread of Lindy across America.

=== Dean Collins and Hollywood ===
Lindy Hop's movement into the American and international mainstream is largely attributed to four factors: Hollywood films, dance studios, instructors such as Arthur Murray, touring dance troupes, and ordinary people (e.g., American troops in WWII bringing Lindy Hop to new countries). One of key figures in Lindy Hop's move to Hollywood was Dean Collins.

Dean Collins learned Lindy Hop from his Jewish sisters in New Jersey, and the Savoy Ballroom. He became a high-profile dancer of this style on the west coast of the United States, appearing in a number of Hollywood films, such as Hellzapoppin'.

== World War II era (1941 to 1945) ==
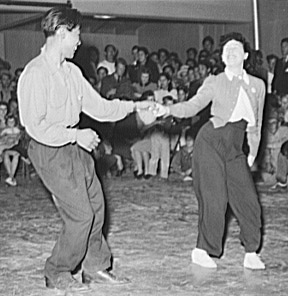
Lindy Hoppers at a jitterbug contest in 1942

During the beginning of World War II, Japanese-Americans and other groups were unjustly interned in camps. Despite this, Japanese-Americans formed swing bands, bringing solace and community to fellow detainees. These bands played lively music, including swing and big band tunes, lifting spirits in the camps. Through performances and dances, they provided moments of joy and escape from the hardships of internment.

In 1943, Life magazine featured Lindy Hop on its cover and called it "America's National Folk Dance". Lindy Hop/Jitterbug was a popular dance used by the media as a military recruitment tool. Places like the Hollywood Canteen were featured in films to capitalize on the dance's popularity, attracting individuals and promoting enlistment. The energetic rhythms and exhilarating movements of Lindy Hop/Jitterbug symbolized patriotism and camaraderie, generating excitement and a sense of adventure in joining the military. By showcasing these dances at venues such as the Hollywood Canteen, the media effectively instilled a spirit of unity and support for the troops, contributing to the war effort and shaping the cultural landscape of that era.

Bette Davis, one of the owners of the Hollywood Canteen, insisted on the full integration of race and sex there, even when most other military canteens and USO venues strictly practiced segregation. Initially, her policy was rejected, but it was implemented after she threatened to quit. However, in practice, visitors still tended to socialize along racial lines, and servicewomen were often confined to the upstairs balcony area.

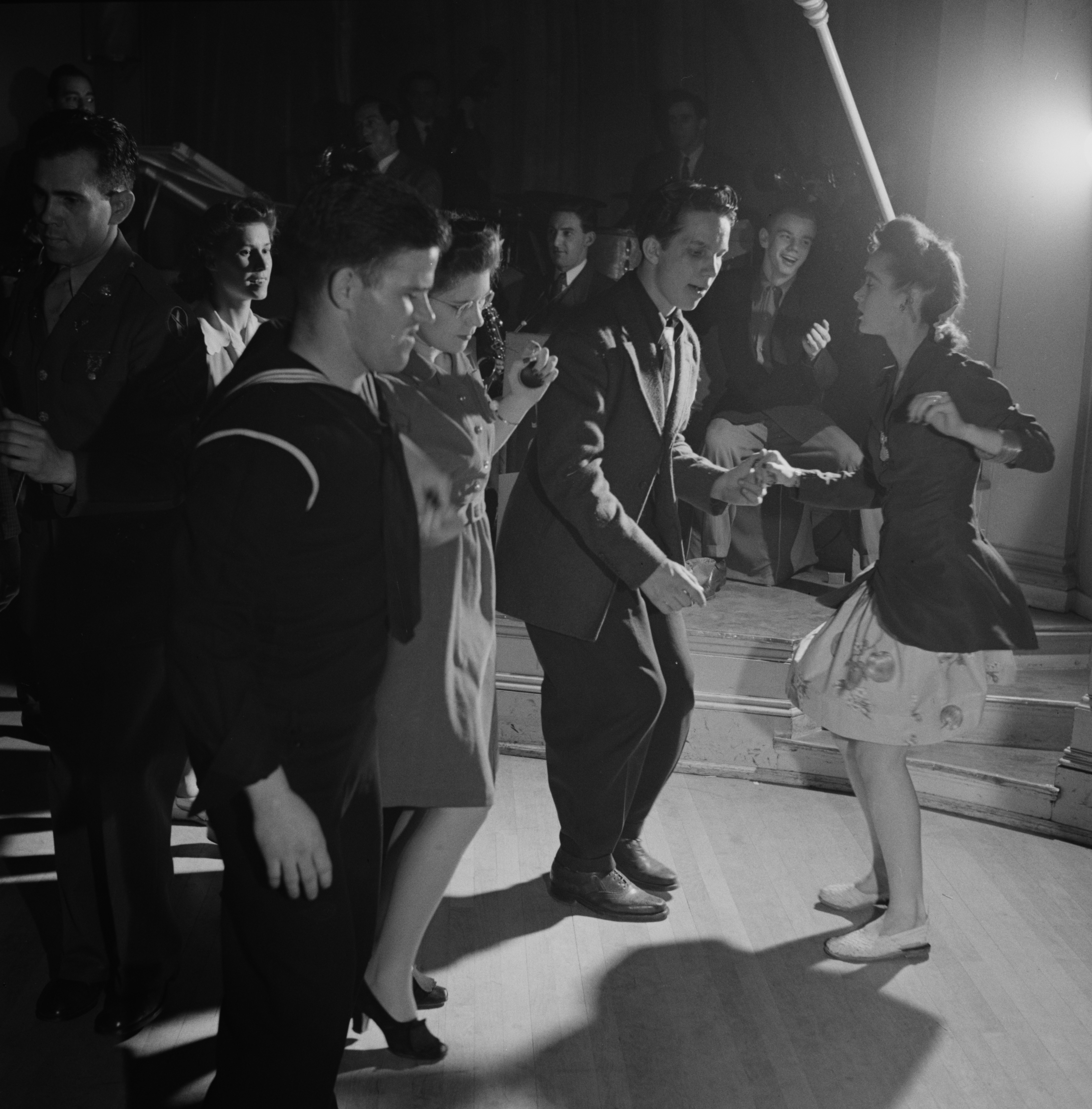
Lindy Hop at an Elk's Club dance

During the war, many top performers were called to military service, including many Lindy Hoppers and musicians. Lindy hop became a wartime recreation, with dancers developing as the most well-known and common faces in popular musical films. Frankie Manning and other members of the Whitey's Lindy Hoppers were drafted, prompting the disbanding of the group. Norma Miller would go on to Southern California where she would perform at the clubs off Central Ave from 1943-46. It was during this time that balboa, swing, and shag dancers mention going to these clubs with their African-American friends, who were in such films as Cabin in the Sky. One such club, Club Alabam, where Norma worked, even hosted an annual drag contest.

In 1943, the Zoot Suit Riots occurred, incited by a series of racially motivated attacks targeting Mexican-American and other youths, particularly those who were jazz-loving enthusiasts wearing zoot suits. The riots primarily took place in Los Angeles, California, and involved clashes between servicemen, primarily white sailors and soldiers, and young Mexican-Americans. The tensions escalated due to a combination of social, cultural, and economic factors, as well as racial prejudice. The Zoot Suit Riots have since been recognized as a significant event in the history of civil rights and racial relations in the United States.

In 1944, due to continued involvement in World War II, the United States levied a 30 percent federal excise tax against "dancing" nightclubs. Although the tax was later reduced to 20 percent, "No Dancing Allowed" signs went up all over the country (though there was never a nation-wide ban).

== Post-war era (1945 to 1984) ==
After the Second World War, music changed. Jazz clubs, burdened by new taxes and legislation limiting venues' ability to employ musicians and dancers or host dancing, employed only smaller bands and filled dance floors with tables. Musicians, immersed in the new world of bebop and cool jazz wanted patrons to pay attention and listen, not dance.

The rise of rock and roll and bebop in the 1950s saw a further decline in the popularity of jazz for dancing, and Lindy Hop slipped from the public eye. Many black dancers had been drafted into the war, including Frankie Manning. When these dancers came back to the U.S., they found that the music scene of the country was different. People were mixing Lindy Hop with other dances, like bebop. Many black dancers thus gave up on the Lindy Hop, and it was further adapted by white Americans into Rock and Roll dancing, East Coast Swing, West Coast Swing and other dances.

== Revival era (1980s) ==
Lindy Hop was revived in the 1980s by dancers in New York City, California, Stockholm, and the United Kingdom. Each group independently searched for original Lindy Hop dancers and, for those who lived outside of New York City, traveled to New York City to work with them. Al Minns, Pepsi Bethel, Frankie Manning and Norma Miller came out of retirement and toured the world teaching Lindy Hop, later to be joined by dancers such as George and Sugar Sullivan.

=== British revival ===
Louise "Mama Lou" Parks was a hostess at the Savoy Ballroom who promised Charles Buchanan that she would continue holding the Lindy Hop portion of the Harvest Moon Ball dance competition after the Savoy Ballroom closed. She helped preserve the dance by teaching the performance and competition aspects to a new generation of dancers, and in doing so, helped a generation from getting in trouble with the law. After Parks contacted Wolfgang Steuer of the World Rock 'N' Roll Federation in Germany about sponsoring the winners of her Harvest Moon Ball at their international swing dance competition, she started to become more well known in Europe and caught the attention of the British TV company London Weekend Television. In 1981 they paid for one of Mama Lou's events to be re-staged at Small's Paradise Club on 7th Avenue in Harlem."

The program aired in late 1982 on the arts program The South Bank Show and featured Parks, her Traditional Jazz Dance Company, and the Lindy Hop. The TV show sparked so much interest in the dance that Mama Lou Parks and her Traditional Jazz Dance Company toured the UK in 1983 and 1984. Terry Monaghan and Warren Heyes met each other at her workshops in London in 1983. Afterwards, they decided to form the British dance company The Lindy Hop Jivers, later renamed to the Jiving Lindy Hoppers.

In March 1985, the Jiving Lindy Hoppers (Warren Heyes, Terry Monaghan, Ryan Francois, Claudia Gintersdorfer, and Lesley Owen) travelled to New York City on their first research visit. Their goal was primarily to meet Al Minns but when they arrived, they learned that he was in hospital and not expected to live much longer. (Al Minns died on 24 April 1985.) Through Mama Lou Parks, they met Alfred "Pepsi" Bethel and trained with him for two weeks in New York City followed by another week in London. While in NY, they also met two former members of Whitey's Lindy Hoppers, Frankie Manning and Norma Miller, dance historians Mura Dehn, Sally Sommer, and Ernie Smith, as well as dance enthusiasts that had just formed the New York Swing Dance Society in 1985. During the 1980s, the Jiving Lindy Hoppers were instrumental in spreading Lindy Hop throughout the UK by teaching and performing at shows, festivals and on TV. In January 1984, the Jiving Lindy Hoppers started teaching Lindy Hop in London. After the first few classes, Ryan Francois joined the classes and later that year became a member of the Jiving Lindy Hoppers. During the 1990s, he was considered one of the most talented modern Lindy Hoppers and travelled internationally to teach and perform the Lindy Hop with his dance company, Zoots and Spangles Authentic Jazz Dance Company (formed in 1986), formed with two other dancers who also left The Jiving Lindyhoppers troupe to form Zoots and Spangles. On 31 October 1987, Simon Erland, a sculptor and dance enthusiast, started Jitterbugs London with Ryan Francoise, the first European lindy hop and swing club to run weekly events with classes, which began the social lindy hop revival. Ryan's troupe Zoots and Spangles were an integral part of the club and performed there regularly as well as in stage shows, which grew the popular awareness of the dance. Jitterbugs and Zoots were the real catalyst for the lindy hop revival in the 1980s and 1990s. Ryan Francois and Julie Oram taught lindy hop classes followed by DJed music from the 1930s, 1940s and 1950s. Sing Lim, "an extra enthusiastic and energetic dancer", became good friends with Ryan and Julie, and in 1991 she started to help run Jitterbugs. Sing Lim taught the dance classes when Ryan and Julie were out of town performing for Zoots and Spangles, as well as helped advertise and promote the club. When Sing Lim returned to Singapore in 1994, she started Jitterbugs Swingapore and helped spread lindy hop to Singapore, Australia, and Japan, as well as to parts of the U.S.

In 1986, Simon Selmon started taking lindy hop classes from Warren Heyes, his previous rock and roll dance instructor who had now converted to lindy hop. The dance classes inspired Simon Selmon to travel to New York City later that year, where he met Margaret Batiuchok, one of the founders of the New York Swing Dance Society. Upon his return to London, he started the London Swing Dance Society in a similar manner to the New York Swing Dance Society. Later, Simon Selmon travelled throughout Europe, America, and Japan teaching lindy hop.

=== American revival ===
In 1981, Al Minns was rediscovered by Sandra Cameron and Larry Schulz during a Louise "Mama Lou" Parks event. They invited him to teach at Sandra's dance studio, the Sandra Cameron Dance Center (SCDC). Another instrumental figure was Paul Grecki, who also worked with Al and later with Frankie Manning at the studio. Minns joined the dance center and began a swing program there in 1982. Frankie Manning joined the Center in 1985.

Californian dancers Erin Stevens and Steven Mitchell flew to New York City to take classes with him in 1983 and 1984. When Al Minns died in 1985, they learned about Frankie Manning through Bob Crease, a board member of the New York Swing Dance Society. They visited Frankie Manning in 1986 and are credited with convincing him to begin instructing lindy hop. Erin Stevens and Steven Mitchell helped spread lindy hop to California and other locations within the US. With Frankie Manning out of retirement, he continued where Al Minns left off at the Sandra Cameron Dance Center. Eventually the demand for his dance instruction increased and Frankie Manning started to travel and teach worldwide, spreading his joy of lindy hop.

=== Swedish revival ===
Three Swedish dancers who later formed an influential performance and teaching group called The Rhythm Hot Shots traveled to New York City in April 1984 in search of Al Minns, one of Whitey's Lindy Hoppers. They invited Al Minns to Stockholm, where he held a dance workshop in 1984 for the newly created Swedish Swing Society. When Al Minns died in 1985, they asked Frankie Manning to come to Sweden. The Swedish Swing Society and The Rhythm Hot Shots helped spread lindy hop throughout Sweden and the rest of the world, partly through the Herräng Dance Camp, held every summer since 1982 in the town of Herräng.

== Neo-swing era (1990s) ==
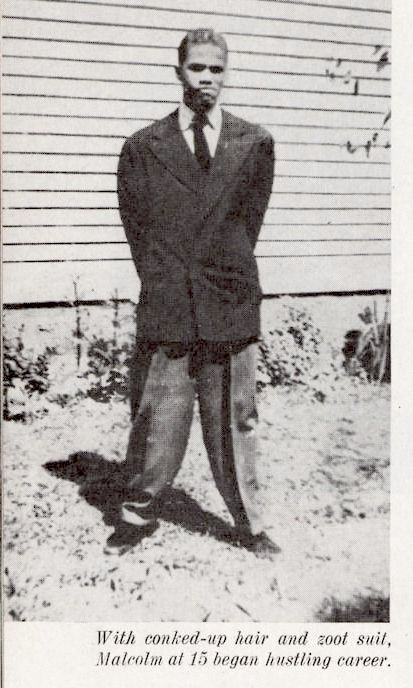
Malcolm X Zoot Suit at age 15

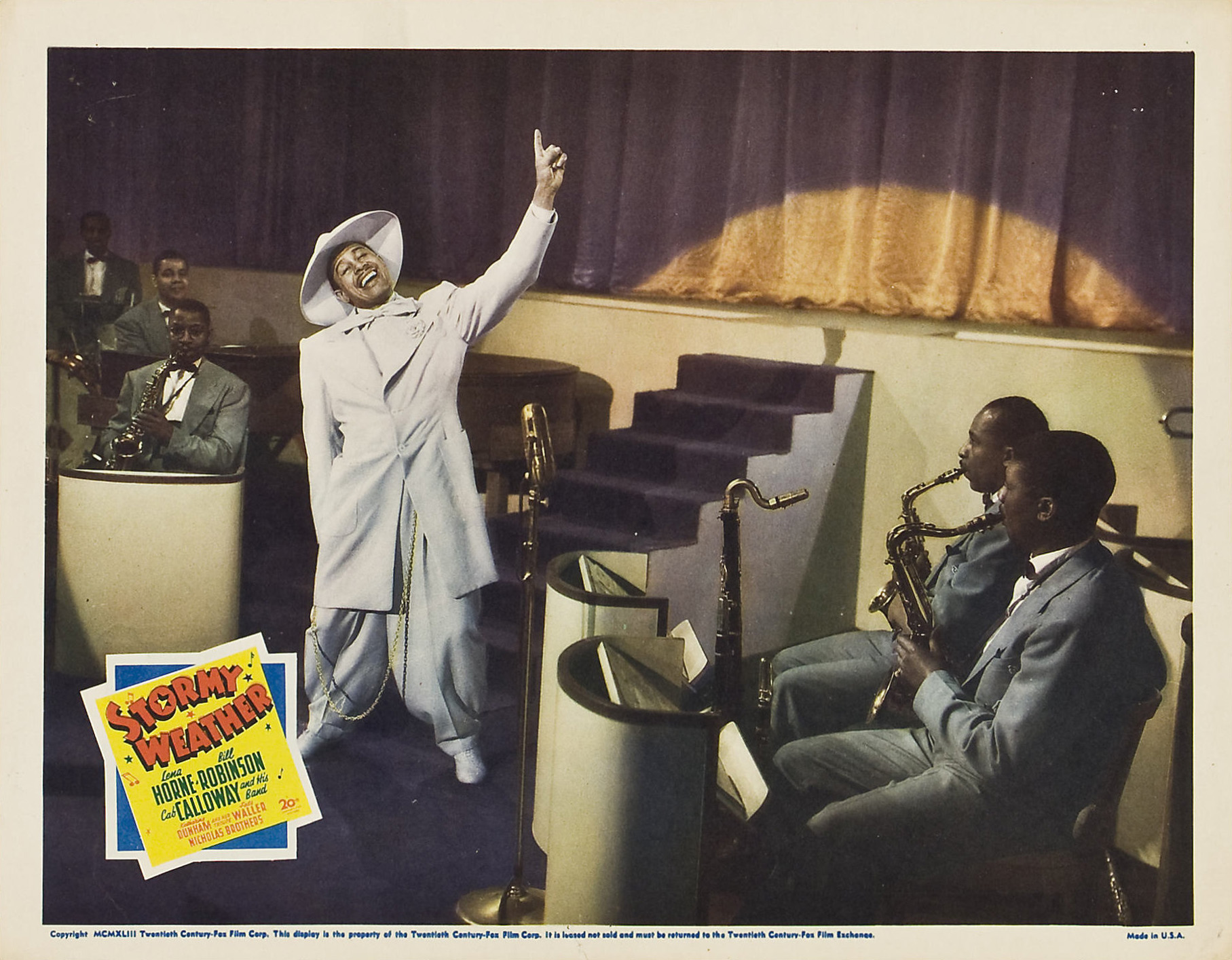
Cab Calloway 1943

After Frankie Manning won a Tony Award in 1989 for his choreography in the musical Black and Blue, the popularity of neo-swing during the swing revival stimulated mainstream interest in the dance. Hollywood and music artists drew inspiration from the iconic Savoy Ballroom and Smalls Paradise of the 1930s and 1940s, as well as from the admiration of popular musicians like Cab Calloway, and actresses like Dorothy Jean Dandridge.

In 1992, Frankie Manning choreographed the dance sequence for the movie Malcolm X, featuring swing dancing. Aladdin, also released that year, included a swing number. In 1993, the movie Swing Kids showcased swing dancing as a form of youth resistance to the Nazi party in Germany. The Jungle Book and The Mask, released in 1994, incorporated swing elements, along with the cult hit movie Swingers in 1996. However, the song "Zoot Suit Riot" by Cherry Poppin' Daddies, which gained popularity in 1997, truly added to the craze. The "Khaki Swing" television commercials for Gap featuring swing dancing further fueled the neo-swing trend in 1998. Additionally, the film Blast from the Past (1999) featured the song “Mr. Zoot Suit.”

During this era, there was a swing revival as many artists transitioned from rock, punk rock, rockabilly jump blues and ska rhythms with blazing horns and flamboyant presentation into a reinterpretation of swinging jazz themes and classic songs.

Bands and clubs dedicated to neo-swing emerged in major cities across the United States, and the genre's influence spread internationally. Swing dancers, inspired by films, advertisements, and bands, adopted the style, donning elaborate zoot suits and accessories, echoing past fashion trends.

Revivalist lindy hoppers, including the Jiving Lindy Hoppers, Sandra Cameron Dance Center, the New York Swing Dance Society, Rhythm Hot Shots, Sylvia Sykes, and Erin Stevens, played a crucial role in the resurgence of swing. They had the unique opportunity to learn from the original Savoy dancers and share their knowledge by offering lindy hop classes to young people who were interested.

The neo-swing era then popularized the dance, with these revivalists conducting extensive research, learning from the past, and bringing swing back into the spotlight. Their efforts reintroduced swing to the general public, creating a strong and popular foundation that has ensured the continuation of this art form until today.

== See also ==
- Lindy Hop today

== Notes ==
^aThe dance marathon at the Manhattan Casino was specifically for "Negro" dancers. George Snowden and his partner Mattie Purnell won "all the prizes for fancy stepping and other competitions" on June 20, 1928, during the third evening of competition. On June 27, The New York Times reported that Aurelia Ida Hallback and Bernard Paul, a couple in the dance marathon, had planned to marry on Friday, June 29. They were going to withdraw from the competition until the promoter, John Lavaro, said that a minister would be provided if they were still in the competition on their intended wedding date. The couple decided to marry while still dancing in the marathon and their wedding was recorded by FOX Movietone News in "MVTN C 4980: Couple Dance on Way to Get Marriage License Archived 2016-01-15 at the Wayback Machine". Four couples remained when the dance marathon was forced by the Health Commissioner to end after 16 days, on July 3. The eight finalists were awarded an equal portion of the $1000 prize at the Savoy Ballroom on Friday, July 6, 1928.
