= Lindy Hop =

American dance

Willa Mae Ricker and Leon James, original Lindy Hop dancers in iconic Life magazine photograph, 1943

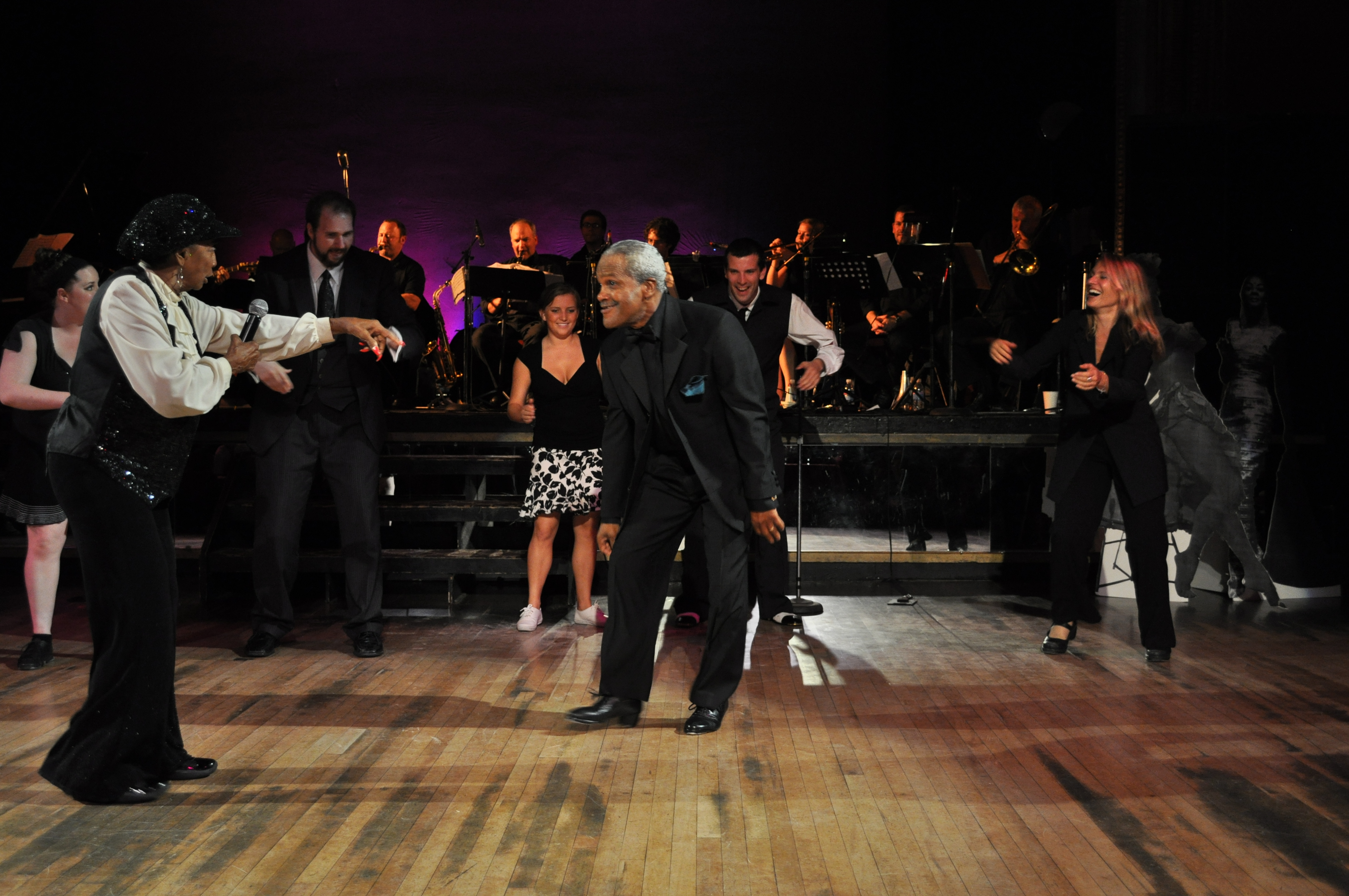
Norma Miller and Skip Cunningham 2009

Lindy Hop Dance, 2013

The Lindy Hop is an American dance which was born in the African-American communities of Harlem, New York City, in 1928 and has evolved since then. It was very popular during the swing era of the late 1930s and early 1940s. Lindy is a fusion of many dances that preceded it or were popular during its development but is mainly based on jazz, tap, breakaway, and Charleston. It is frequently described as a jazz dance and is a member of the swing dance family.

In its development, the Lindy Hop combined elements of both partnered and solo dancing by using the movements and improvisation of African-American dances along with the formal eight-count structure of European partner dances – most clearly illustrated in the Lindy's defining move, the swingout. In this step's open position, each dancer is generally connected hand-to-hand; in its closed position, leads and follows are connected as though in an embrace on one side and holding hands on the other.

There was renewed interest in the dance in the 1980s from American, Swedish, and British dancers and the Lindy Hop is now represented by dancers and loosely affiliated grass-roots organizations in North America, South America, Europe, Asia, and Oceania.

Lindy Hop today is danced as a social dance, as a competitive dance, as a performance dance, and in classes, workshops, and camps. Partners may dance alone or together, with improvisation a central part of social dancing and many performance and competition pieces.

Lindy Hop is sometimes referred to as a street dance, referring to its improvisational and social nature. In 1932, twelve-year-old Norma Miller did the Lindy Hop outside the Savoy Ballroom with her friends for tips. In 1935, 15,000 people danced on Bradhurst Avenue for the second of a dance series held by the Parks Department. Between 147th and 148th street, Harlem "threw itself into the Lindy Hop with abandon" as Sugar Hill residents watched from the bluffs along Edgecombe Avenue.

== History ==
=== From jazz to swing (1920s–1940s) ===
==== Name origins ====
The first dances named as lindy hop were born around the time the aviator Charles Lindbergh made his groundbreaking flight across the Atlantic Ocean in May 1927. The most famous lindy hop dance, which is not connected to the other lindy hop dances, was born in the Harlem dance marathon in 1928 where George "Shorty" Snowden and Mattie Purnell reinvented the breakaway pattern by accident. From then on, the dance became known as the "Lindy Hop." That started a process in which their invention became bigger than it initially suggested. The Harlem dance is the only one of the lindy hop dances that survived in the long run.

The Harlem lindy hop developed probably from four possible sources, or some combination thereof: the breakaway, the Charleston, the Texas Tommy, and the hop.

A recorded source of the non-Harlem-connected lindy hop dances is the famed aviator Charles Lindbergh, nicknamed "Lucky Lindy", who "hopped the Atlantic" in 1927. After Lindbergh's solo non-stop flight from New York to Paris in 1927 he became incredibly popular and many people named songs, recipes and businesses among several other things, after him. Te Roy Williams and His Orchestra recorded the song "Lindbergh Hop", written by Ted Nixon and Elmer Snowden, on May 25, 1927 (Harmony Records). The Memphis Jug Band on September 13, 1928, recorded "Lindberg Hop- Overseas stomp", written by Jab Jones and Will Shade (on Victor Records).

The first of the lindy hop-named dances was probably the "Lindbergh Hop" which was referred to as lindy hop in the headline of an article in Pittsburgh Gazette Times on May 25, 1927, just four days after Lindbergh landed at Le Bourget. The dance was reported to be Broadway's tribute to Lindbergh, and it included six basic steps.

Later, a "lindy hop" dance was described by columnist Gilbert Swan. He wrote, "Obviously the first dance named for the Lindbergh flight was the 'lindy hop'...Like all trick dances, they will be done in a few theatres and dance halls, where experts appear, and that will be that". Later that year, on September 14, the Woodland Daily Democrat reported Catherine B. Sullivan describing the "lindy hop" as having been placed third in the Dancing Masters of America, New Dances competition, behind the Kikajou and the Dixie Step. (The "lindy hop" was also described in reports as the "Lindbergh Glide"). The journalist reports that Miss Johnson showed a very fast little step, with hops and a kick, whilst holding the arms out, like the Spirit of St. Louis. The foot work is described as "dum-de-dum, dum-de-dum, dum-de-dum".

According to Ethel Williams, the lindy hop was similar to the dance known as the Texas Tommy in New York in 1913. The basic steps in the Texas Tommy were followed by a breakaway identical to that found in the lindy. Savoy dancer "Shorty" George Snowden told Marshall Stearns in 1959 that "We used to call the basic step the Hop long before Lindbergh did his hop across the Atlantic. It had been around a long time and some people began to call it the Lindbergh Hop after 1927, although it didn't last. Then, during the marathon at Manhattan Casino, I got tired of the same old steps and cut loose with a breakaway..." According to Snowden, Fox Movietone News covered the marathon and took a close-up of Shorty's feet. As told to Marshall and Jean Stearns, he was asked "What are you doing with your feet," and replied, "The Lindy". The date was June 17, 1928.

Snowden's account to Stearns probably refers to the fact that he used already existing elements of the dance when he and his partner Mattie Purnell had an accident in the dance marathon where they became separated for a while until Snowden got back to Purnell. According to Snowden, the crowd in the dance marathon answered enthusiastically to the accident. As Marshall Stearns put it, Snowden rediscovered the Breakaway pattern when the accident happened. But the accident where Snowden and Purnell devised the basic principle of the lindy hop turned out to be much bigger than it initially suggested. Their invention started a process which led the lindy hop to contests, theaters and ballrooms by the end of 1928, and to Broadway plays by 1930. Thus, Snowden and Purnell are the creators of the Harlem lindy hop.

The first generation of lindy hop is popularly associated with dancers such as "Shorty" George Snowden, his partner Big Bea, and Leroy Stretch Jones and Little Bea. "Shorty" George and Big Bea regularly won contests at the Savoy Ballroom. Their dancing accentuated the difference in size with Big Bea towering over Shorty. These dancers specialized in so-called floor steps, but they also experimented with early versions of air steps in the lindy hop.

As white people began going to Harlem to watch black dancers, according to Langston Hughes:

The lindy-hoppers at the Savoy even began to practice acrobatic routines, and to do absurd things for the entertainment of the whites, that probably never would have entered their heads to attempt for their own effortless amusement. Some of the lindy-hoppers had cards printed with their names on them and became dance professors teaching the tourists. Then Harlem nights became show nights for the Nordics.

Hughes's mocking statement reflects how the Harlem Renaissance movement acknowledged the lindy hop, which the movement considered part of "low culture", and thus not an important cultural achievement. According to Snowden, "When he finally offered to pay us, we went up and had a ball. All we wanted to do was dance anyway."

==== Aerial creation ====
When by 1936 "air steps" or "aerials" such as the Hip to Hip, Side Flip, and Over the Back (the names describe the motion of the follow in the air) began to appear, the old guard of dancers such as Leon James, Leroy Jones, and Shorty Snowden disapproved of the new moves.

Younger dancers fresh out of high school (Al Minns, Joe Daniels, Russell Williams, and Pepsi Bethel) worked out the Back Flip, "Over the head", and "the Snatch".

Frankie Manning was part of a new generation of lindy hoppers, and is the most celebrated lindy hopper in history. Al Minns and Pepsi Bethel, Leon James, and Norma Miller are also featured prominently in contemporary histories of lindy hop. Some sources credit Manning, working with his partner Freida Washington, for inventing the ground-breaking "air step" or "aerial" in 1935. One source credits Minns and Bethel as among those who refined the air step. However, early versions of air steps in the lindy hop were performed already from the very beginning of the 1930s. An air step is a dance move in which at least one of the partners' two feet leave the ground in a dramatic, acrobatic style. Most importantly, it is done in time with the music. Air steps are now widely associated with the characterization of lindy hop, despite being generally reserved for competition or performance dancing, and not generally being executed on any social dance floor.

==== Mainstream culture ====
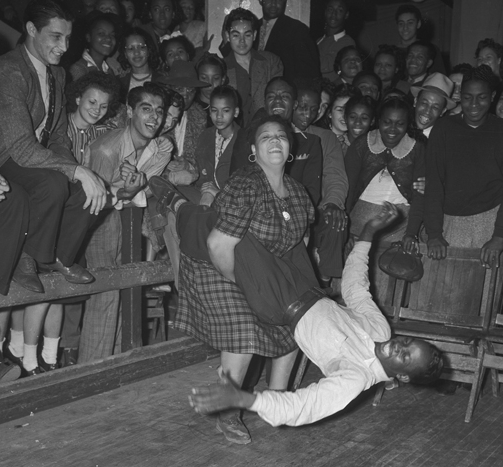
Lindy Hop dancing in 1939, Southern California

Lindy hop entered mainstream American culture in the 1930s, gaining popularity through multiple sources. Dance troupes, including the Whitey's Lindy Hoppers (also known as the Harlem Congaroos), Hot Chocolates and Big Apple Dancers exhibited the lindy hop. Hollywood films, such as A Day at the Races (1937) and Hellzapoppin' (1941) began featuring the lindy hop in dance sequences. Dance studios such as those of Arthur Murray began teaching lindy hop. By the early 1940s the dance was known as "New Yorker" on the West Coast.

Jazz-loving youths were enamored with the bands of the time, influenced by radio stations and the film industry showcasing clips. In Nazi Germany, the Swingjugend, young rebels, defied the regime's cultural restrictions by embracing banned swing music. Similarly, in California and other parts of the country, Mexican-Americans, Japanese-heritage individuals, black, and white youth all adored jazz music and wanted to learn the new dance steps.

This African American dance would be integral in shaping the aesthetics of contemporary African American culture and tradition. The swing dance was influenced by a variety of other different dances during the time like the Charleston, jazz and tap. It would soon be influential in overall pop-culture and dance at the time. During the creation of this dance, segregation was in place. Even with these limitations the African American community is still able to celebrate their heritage and black musical traditions with a dance that embodies elements of improvisations and musicality, while surviving as a reminder of the historical context from which black art forms emerged.

In 1943, lindy hop was featured on the cover of Life magazine, becoming America's National Folk Dance and a recruitment tool for the military. Hollywood capitalized on its popularity in films, promoting enlistment for the military and fostering unity and support for the troops.

In 1944, due to continued involvement in World War II, the United States levied a 30 percent federal excise tax on "dancing" nightclubs. Although the tax was later reduced to 20 percent, "No Dancing Allowed" signs went up all over the country (though there was never a nation-wide dance ban).

== Lindy Hop Culture ==
=== Boston Lindy Hop Culture in the 1940's ===
Malcolm X, who was an avid Lindy Hop dancer and jazz fan, recalled in his autobiography what the Lindy Hop culture and atmosphere was like in Boston at the Roseland-State Ballroom during the 1940's. Much of the attire during this time period included hipster styles such as zoot suits for men and high-heels and skirts for women. Black and tan clubs would hold segregated and integrated nights.

Both men and women would select dance partners, who were oftentimes strangers, and hit a waxed dance floor packed with other couples. Dance moves included circling, tap-dancing, boosting partners up, "the flapping eagle", "the kangaroo", and "the split." Men would lead the dances with a half-bent arm out on one side and the other hand on their partner's waist guiding their partner with small pushes and pulls.

When the last hour of the dance came around, band leaders like Count Basie and Duke Ellington would signal a "showtime blast" which is when dancers moved off of the floor into spectator positions and only the best lindy-hoppers would stay on the floor to engage in an elimination style dance competition. Spectators would make a "U" formation on the dance floor with the band stage placed at the opening of the "U." They would cheer as competing dance pairs shuffled in-and-out similar to how a dance cypher operates in hip-hop. Women who competed would dart into the side-lines when "showtime" was announced to change from high-heels to white sneakers as they wanted to dance comfortably and uninhibited by footwear. Women without partners would run up-and-down the dance floor looking to grab the best lindy-hoppers. Bands would be "wailing" and the audience would be cheering as multi-colored spotlights pointed out couples as they danced.

== Styles ==
=== Savoy-style Lindy Hop ===
Savoy-style Lindy Hop is characterized by a high energy, circular, rotating style. This particular style of lindy hop was most frequently associated with dancers from the 1930s, such as Frankie Manning.

The term "Savoy-style lindy hop" applies a generic relationship between all African American lindy hoppers (and aficionados of their styles) which ignores the variety and diversity of lindy hop in the 1930s and 1940s. Lindy hop historians see clear differences between the lindy hop of the early years of its development (the late 1920s) and dancers such as "Shorty" George Snowden, dancers of the 1930s (such as Manning), and then between individual dancers during these periods.

Lennart Westerlund described the differences in styles between Manning and Al Minns, the dancer he worked with in the earliest years of the lindy hop revival. Al Minns and Leon James are often considered authoritative figures in the academic discussion of lindy hop, in part for their work with Marshall Stearns and Jean Stearns (in their book Jazz Dance and documentary films). Lindy hop historians also draw clear distinctions between the dancing styles of key female dancers such as Norma Miller and Ann Johnson. The most useful point to be made about this variation within a single community of dancers in one historical moment is that vernacular African American dance, and lindy hop in particular, prioritized individual style and creative improvisation and musical interpretation within a particular dance style.

==== Features ====
A swingout

In describing Savoy style lindy hop, observers note that the follower is led out of the basic swingout sideways as a default. This is not the case, however, as leading a follow out backwards or forwards is just as likely. Savoy style is also said to be characterized by a pronounced downwards "bounce", which is again something of a misnomer, as different dancers employed varying degrees and types of "bounce", and observers of Frankie Manning have noted changes in his own dancing style in this respect over the years. Despite these comments, the "bounce" described is characteristic of many African American vernacular dance forms. One of the clearest distinctions between Hollywood and Smooth style lindy hop and Savoy style lindy hop is the open "connection" and relative freedom of the follower to improvise within the structure of the swingout in particular. Again, this technical difference varies between individual dancers and between teachers today. Historians may also note that Hollywood style, while often characterized by a more intense connection (characterized at its extreme by counter balance), also featured extensive variations and individual improvisation within the swingout in other instances.

==== African American identity ====
African American and African dances which are present in the lindy hop of these dancers in this period.

These may include:

- clear angles at the ankle – between leg and foot – and often at the wrist and/or elbow
- wide-legged stances for both followers and leaders, particularly in the follower's swivel
- Frankie Manning's characteristically "athletic" stance – like a runner spread out in motion, parallel to the ground – echoes African dance
- particular "variations" or jazz steps associated with Savoy-style date back to the African communities from which African American slaves were taken (and are discussed in the History of slavery in the United States article), including the move "the itch".

=== 'Hollywood Style' Lindy Hop ===
Sometimes referred to as Dean Collins style, or alternatively, 'Smooth Style' lindy hop, is a dance style named after Dean Collins, a Jewish man who danced at the Savoy Ballroom before 1936 and became a high-profile dancer of this style on the west coast of the United States, appearing in Hollywood films such as Hellzapoppin' (1941).

The Dean Collins style was danced at the Savoy Ballroom in Harlem during the 1930s and 1940s. Unfortunately, we do not have footage of the other white dancers who were part of Whitey's Lindy Hoppers, making it difficult to observe their dance style. However, we do have footage of Sonny Allen and George Lloyd showcasing a slot dance style, meaning the follower travels in a straight line instead of the more elliptical or circular Savoy-style lindy hop.

The swingout (the basic step of lindy) is danced in a position often described as someone about to sit on a stool, thereby bringing their center point of balance closer to the ground. This piked position is the classic look of Hollywood with the back straight and a slight forward tilt. This style originated from Jewel McGown, who was Dean Collins' dance partner and had prior experience as a Balboa dancer before dancing with him.

Sylvia Sykes and Jonathan Bixby took private lessons from Dean Collins from 1981 to 1984, and passed on his knowledge. Erik Robison and Sylvia Skylar learned by studying under the original dancers from the 1930s and 1940s, such as Jewel McGowan and Jean Veloz, and watching old Hollywood movies of Dean Collins and his friends in the movies. They were the first to refer to it as 'Hollywood Style'.

==== LA-style Lindy Hop ====
A popular variation of Hollywood-Style lindy hop called LA-style lindy hop has a few technical changes in the footwork and fewer steps. The steps are shortened or "cheated" to create this look. The style is geared towards performance and is heavily based on short choreographies.

==== Groove-style Lindy Hop ====
A contemporary variation of lindy hop is characterized by slower music, a greater emphasis on improvisation, and a distinctive "groove" style. This specific usage of lindy hop emerged in the late 1990s in San Francisco and Los Angeles as a way to differentiate it from the popular "Hollywood" or "LA Style" of lindy hop. The Hollywood or LA Style was typically performed to faster music and allowed for limited improvisation, primarily adhering to predefined patterns. The modern lindy hop style broke away from these constraints, providing more freedom for dancers to interpret the music and incorporate their own improvised movements, resulting in a distinct groove-oriented approach.

As Frankie Manning put it, "Everyone at the Savoy had their [own] style." And there was no specific "Savoy style" of lindy hopping.

== Post-swing era (1950s–1970s) ==
After World War II, jazz clubs faced taxes and regulations, leading to smaller bands and a shift towards listening rather than dancing. The rise of rock and roll and bebop in the 1950s diminished jazz's popularity for dancing, causing lindy hop to fade out of the public eye and be replaced by Rock and Roll, East Coast Swing, West Coast Swing, and other styles.

From 1949 to 1968, Norma Miller's Jazz Men performed, showcasing their passion for the dance form. Similarly, from 1949 to 1955, Frankie Manning's Congaroo Dancers enchanted audiences with their lindy hop skills. After the Savoy Ballroom closed in 1958, Louise "Mama Lou" Parks Dancers took the stage and trained to compete in the Harvest Moon Ball. The black community continued to dance with new and inventive styles to emerge. Additionally, in a 1959 or 1960 episode of Playboy's Penthouse, Al Minns and Leon James showcased jazz dances while Marshall Stearns discussed them with Hugh Hefner.

Dean Collins and some of his friends were also dedicated dancers, never ceasing their passion for the dance at various venues, including Bobby McGee's, throughout the decades. Skippy Blair contributed to a new dance scene by opening a dance studio in 1958 to train teachers in the art of West Coast Swing. Several published works were also contributed. Arthur Murray's 1954 edition of "How to Become a Good Dancer" included instructions for swing dances such as the lindy hop. East Coast Swing and lindy hop were equated in Yerrington and Outland's 1961 publication. The 1962 Ballroom Dancebook for Teachers dedicated a chapter to the lindy hop. By 1960, the lindy hop had become known as "swing", as stated in the book "Social Dance" copyrighted in 1969.

In film, "Happy Days" (1974) showcased fifties rock and roll music, sock hops, the Twist, and even a "Harvest Moon" dance contest. In the made-for-television movie "Queen of the Stardust Ballroom" (1975), onscreen dancers such as Dean Collins and Skippy Blair were featured. The 1970s in the UK witnessed the emergence of diverse music trends, including a revival of original rock 'n' roll pioneers. Additionally, the European Rock'n'Roll Association (ERRA) was founded in 1974 by Italy, France, Germany, and Switzerland to promote rock 'n' roll dancing.

== 1980s ==
Lindy hop was revived in the 1980s by dancers in New York City, California, Stockholm, and the United Kingdom. West Coast Swing, ballroom swing, and Rock'n'Roll enthusiasts were on the hunt for old swing dancers, as old videos emerged, showcasing partner dances that had been lost to time. Each group independently searched for original lindy hop dancers and, for those who lived outside of New York City, traveled to New York City to work with them. Al Minns, Pepsi Bethel, Frankie Manning and Norma Miller came out of retirement and toured the world teaching lindy hop, later to be joined by dancers such as George and Sugar Sullivan.

=== British revival ===
Louise "Mama Lou" Parks was a hostess at the Savoy Ballroom who promised Charles Buchanan that she would continue holding the lindy hop portion of the Harvest Moon Ball dance competition after the Savoy Ballroom closed in 1958. She helped preserve the dance by teaching the performance and competition aspects to a new generation of dancers, and in doing so, helped a generation from getting in trouble with the law. After Parks contacted Wolfgang Steuer of the World Rock 'N' Roll Federation in Germany about sponsoring the winners of her Harvest Moon Ball (competitions that ran from 1927 to 1984) at their international swing dance competition, she started to become more well known in Europe and caught the attention of the British TV company London Weekend Television. In 1981 they paid for one of Mama Lou's events to be re-staged at Smalls Paradise Club on 7th Avenue in Harlem.

The program aired in late 1982 on the arts program The South Bank Show and featured Parks, her Traditional Jazz Dance Company, and the lindy hop. The TV show sparked so much interest in the dance that Mama Lou Parks and her Traditional Jazz Dance Company toured the UK in 1983 and 1984. Terry Monaghan and Warren Heyes met each other at her workshops in London in 1983. Afterwards, they decided to form the British dance company the Jiving Lindy Hoppers.

In March 1985, the Jiving Lindy Hoppers (Warren Heyes, Terry Monaghan, Ryan Francois, Claudia Gintersdorfer, and Lesley Owen) travelled to New York City on their first research visit. Their goal was primarily to meet Al Minns but when they arrived, they learned that he was in hospital and not expected to live much longer. (Al Minns died on 24 April 1985.) Through Mama Lou Parks, they met Alfred "Pepsi" Bethel and trained with him for two weeks in New York City followed by another week in London. While in New York, they also met two former members of Whitey's Lindy Hoppers, Frankie Manning and Norma Miller, dance historians Mura Dehn, Sally Sommer, and Ernie Smith, as well as dance enthusiasts that had just formed the New York Swing Dance Society in 1985. During the 1980s, the Jiving Lindy Hoppers were instrumental in spreading lindy hop throughout the UK by teaching and performing at shows, festivals and on TV. In January 1984, the Jiving Lindy Hoppers started teaching lindy hop in London.

=== American revival ===
==== New York ====
In 1981, Al Minns was rediscovered by Sandra Cameron and Larry Schulz during a Louise "Mama Lou" Parks event. They invited him to teach at Sandra's dance studio, the Sandra Cameron Dance Center (SCDC). Another instrumental figure was Paul Grecki, who also worked with Al and later with Frankie Manning at the studio. In 1982, Al Minns was convinced to start teaching lindy hop at SCDC in New York City. Al Minns' early students formed the New York Swing Dance Society, established in 1985.

Frankie Manning continued teaching at the SCDC in 1985, carrying on where Al Minns had left off. As the demand for his dance instruction grew, Frankie Manning started to travel and teach worldwide, sharing his joy of lindy hop.

==== California ====
In 1983–1984, Californian dancers Erin Stevens and Steven Mitchell had taken lessons from Al Minns at SCDC and were actively searching for original Savoy dancers after learning about Frankie Manning through Bob Crease. Stevens discovered three listings for the name Manning in a New York telephone book. Calling the first Frankie Manning, she asked, "Are you Frankie Manning the dancer?" Initially, he replied, "No, I'm Frankie Manning the postal worker." However, after a pause, he added, "But I used to be a dancer." Stevens had indeed found the Manning she was looking for. Erin and Steven visited Frankie Manning and convinced him to begin instructing lindy hop, an experience he cherished as his "first real teaching experience". They played a crucial role in spreading lindy hop to California and other locations within the US.

=== Swedish revival ===
In 1984, three members of The Rhythm Hot Shots from Sweden, namely Lennart Westerlund, Anders Lind, and Henning Sorenson, embarked on a journey to New York. Their purpose was to seek out one of Whitey's Lindy Hoppers and specifically learn from Al Minns. They brought Al Minns to Stockholm in 1984, where he held a dance workshop for the newly created Swedish Swing Society.

When Al Minns died in 1985, they brought Frankie Manning and other original Savoy Ballroom dancers to Stockholm. The Swedish Swing Society and The Rhythm Hot Shots helped spread lindy hop throughout Sweden and the rest of the world, partly through the Herräng Dance Camp held every summer since 1982 in the town of Herräng.

== 1990s–2010s ==
On Broadway, Black and Blue (1989) garnered Frankie Manning a Tony Award for his choreography. The Broadway production of Swing! (1999) showcased lindy hoppers, Latin swing dancers, and country swing stars and continues to be performed worldwide. In film, Frankie Manning choreographed a dance sequence for Malcolm X (1992), while Swing Kids (1993) portrayed the swing dance movement in Nazi Germany, capturing the essence of swing dancing. Notably, Gap aired television commercials titled "Khakis Swing" (1999 and 2000) that featured swing dancing.

=== Music ===
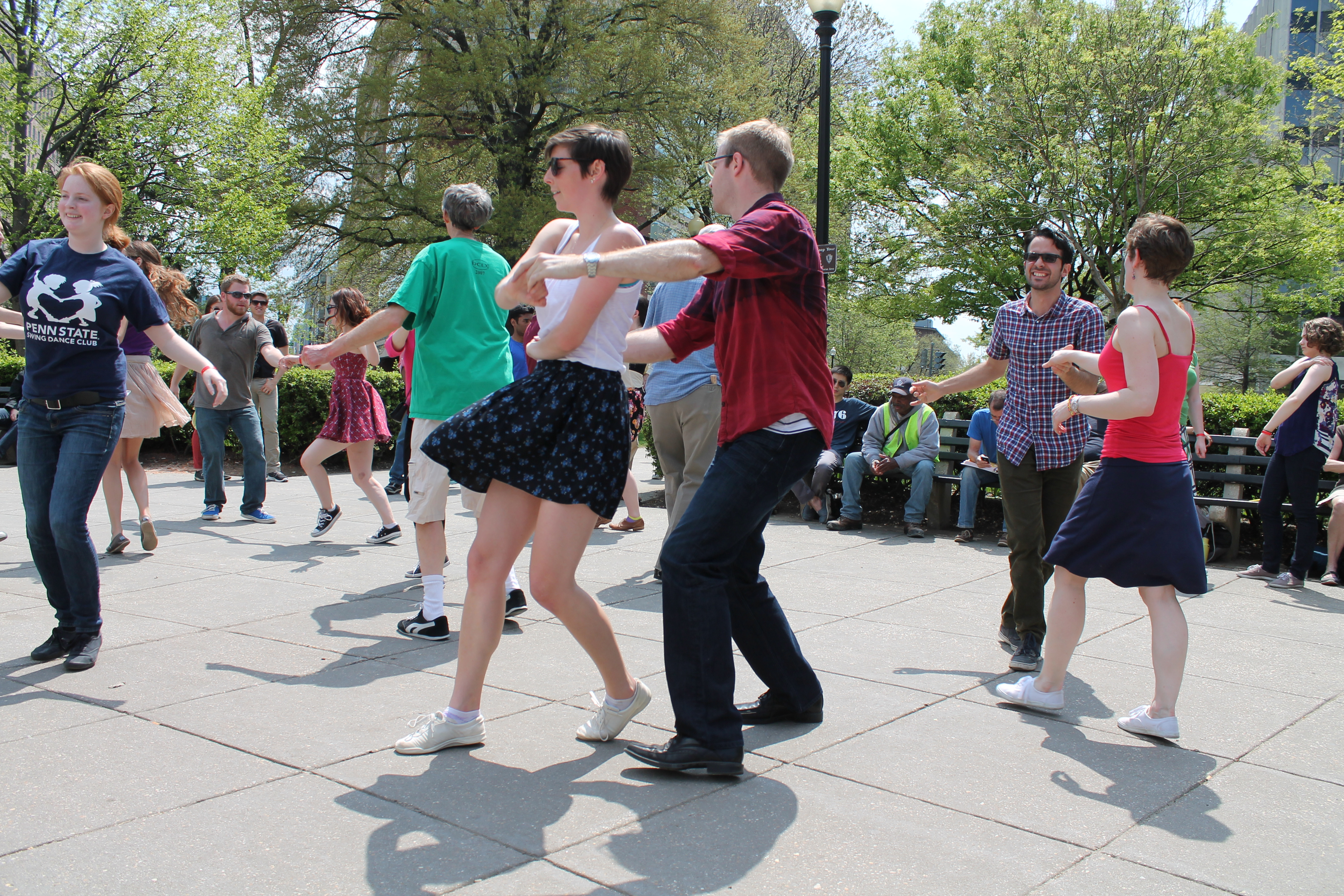
Lindy Hop dancers at DuPont Circle, Washington, DC, on a Saturday afternoon

- Swing revival: The 1990s witnessed a significant swing revival, specifically with the popularity of neo-swing. Bands from various genres such as rock, punk, ska, and rockabilly emerged, including the Cherry Poppin' Daddies, Big Bad Voodoo Daddy, and Squirrel Nut Zippers, leading the way. This revival successfully reintroduced swing music to the mainstream, capturing the attention of a new generation of listeners and retro swing lindy hop dancers.
- Retro swing: Alongside the swing revival, there was a resurgence of interest in retro styles. This led to the popularity of swing music and dance styles such as lindy hop being revived in its traditional form, with bands and artists embracing the swing genre and creating new music that captured the essence of classic swing from the 1920s to the 1940s. This style is still alive today.

=== Dance camps, conventions and exchanges ===
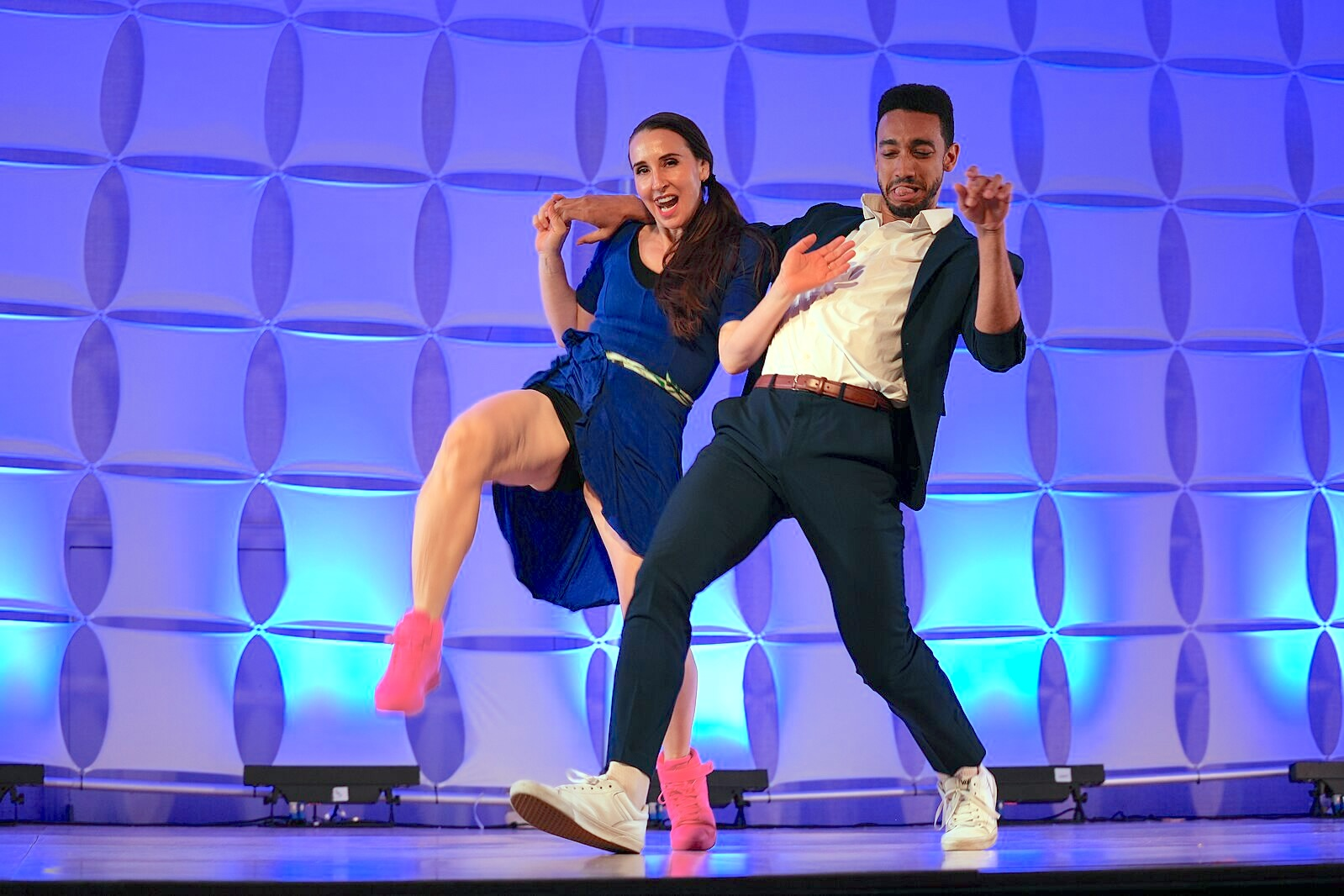
Lindy Hop dancers AJ Howard & Laura Glaess at the California Dance Festival, 2025

There are retro swing lindy hop communities throughout the world. The concept of a lindy exchange, a gathering of lindy hop dancers in one city for several days to dance with visitors and locals, enables different communities to share their ideas with others. The first lindy exchange was called "The Weekend", and occurred on December 4–6, 1998, in California, between the cities of Chicago, Illinois, and San Francisco, California. Many annual lindy hop conventions are held across the world, such as Camp Hollywood in Los Angeles, International Lindy Hop Championships on the US east coast, and Rock That Swing Festival in Munich, Germany.

The International Lindy Hop Championships (ILHC) are a popular American venue. The ILHC holds qualifiers for people from several continents: North America, Latin America, Europe, and Asia. The ILHC hosts both virtual and in-person competitions, with multiple sub-categories for both. Dances performed for the ILHC are posted on their YouTube channel.

Lindy dances are also popular in Houston, Texas, with both the Houston Swing Dance Society (HSDS) and Lindyfest occurring there.

There are numerous independent events as well. Lindy dancers commonly use directories to find events in their area, or notable foreign events.

== Since 2010 ==
“Lindy hop is still danced today, with events held around the world. Camps and competitions bring together dancers of all levels for workshops, social dances, performances and friendly competition. These gatherings give dancers a chance to learn, meet others who share their interest, and celebrate the history of swing dancing. Many in the community also work to preserve the dance and pass it on to future generations.”

Beginning in 2015, the community went through a reckoning over sexual violence after an influential instructor, Steven Mitchell, was accused by multiple women of sexually assaulting them.

In the film industry, So You Think You Can Dance (2005-2010) featured lindy hop performances throughout the seasons. Additionally, the documentary Alive and Kicking (2016), produced by Susan Glatzer, explored the world of swing dancing. In 2022, Sw!ng Out, a swing dance performance choreographed by Caleb Teicher, started touring in the US.

Swing dancing at CCX 2022 in Montreal

The Harvest Moon Hoppers, a New York City–based performance group, dancing a routine at Lindy Focus 2023

=== Music ===
Electro swing, also known as swing house, gained popularity during this period, blending swing music with electronic beats and production techniques. It combined the vintage sound of swing with modern electronic, house and hip hop dance music. This revival successfully reintroduced swing music to the mainstream through venues such as TikTok, capturing the attention of a new generation of listeners and retro swing lindy hop dancers. However, in social dance and lindy hop festivals, traditional swing music dominates the dancefloor.

== See also ==
- Jitterbug
