= Aerial (dance move) =

Swing dance move

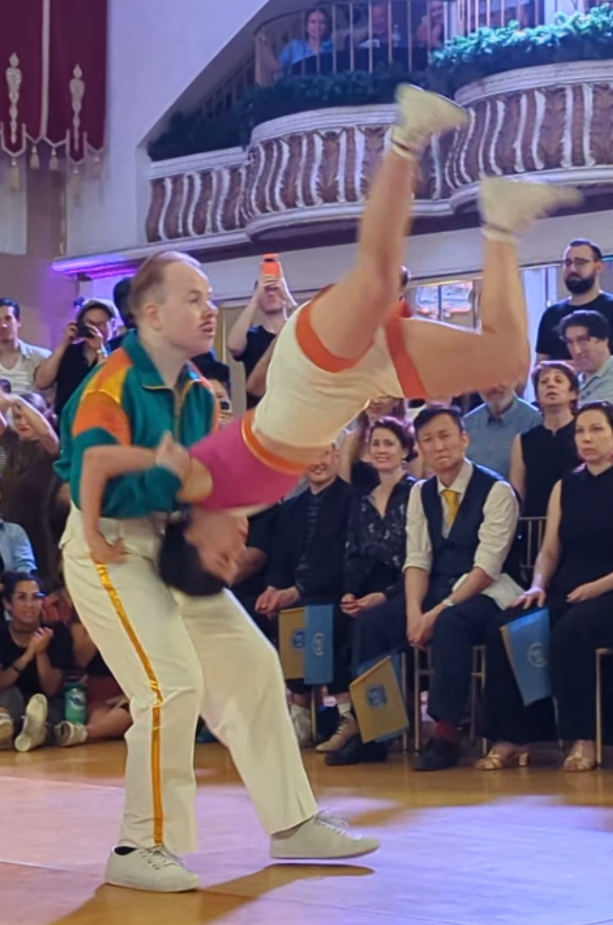
Swing dance aerial move

Aerials being performed during an International Lindy Hop Championships competition in Manhattan

An Aerial (also acrobatic, air step or air) is a dance move in Lindy Hop or Boogie Woogie where one's feet leave the floor. As opposed to a lift, aerial is a step where a partner needs to be thrown into the air and then landed in time with the music. Each aerial consists of a preparation ('prep'), jump or trick itself and the landing.

The first Lindy Hop aerial was performed by Frankie Manning in 1935. Frankie Manning and George "Shorty" Snowden competed in weekly dance contests at the Savoy Ballroom. Shorty George and his partner Big Bea had a move, where they stood back-to-back; they locked arms; Big Bea bent over, picking Shorty George up on her back; and then she carried him off the floor, while he kicked his feet. Frankie Manning wanted to outdo Shorty George, so he convinced his partner Freda Washington, to flip over his back. Called the 'over the back', this flip is considered the first Lindy aerial.

Aerials quickly caught on in Lindy Hop. In 1935, the troupe Whitey's Lindy Hoppers (a.k.a. the Harlem Congeroos) formed and performed at private parties in New York. From 1936 to 1941, they toured the world and performed in movies and some after 1945, showing Lindy Hop and aerials to the world.

Moves similar to aerials had been performed in other dances before 1935. For example, the Nicholas Brothers used leaps and flips in their tap dance routines in the early 1930s at the Cotton Club. Flash dancers, who toured with big bands in the United States in the early twentieth century, performed acrobatic dances, often matched with tap dancers and contortionists in traveling shows.

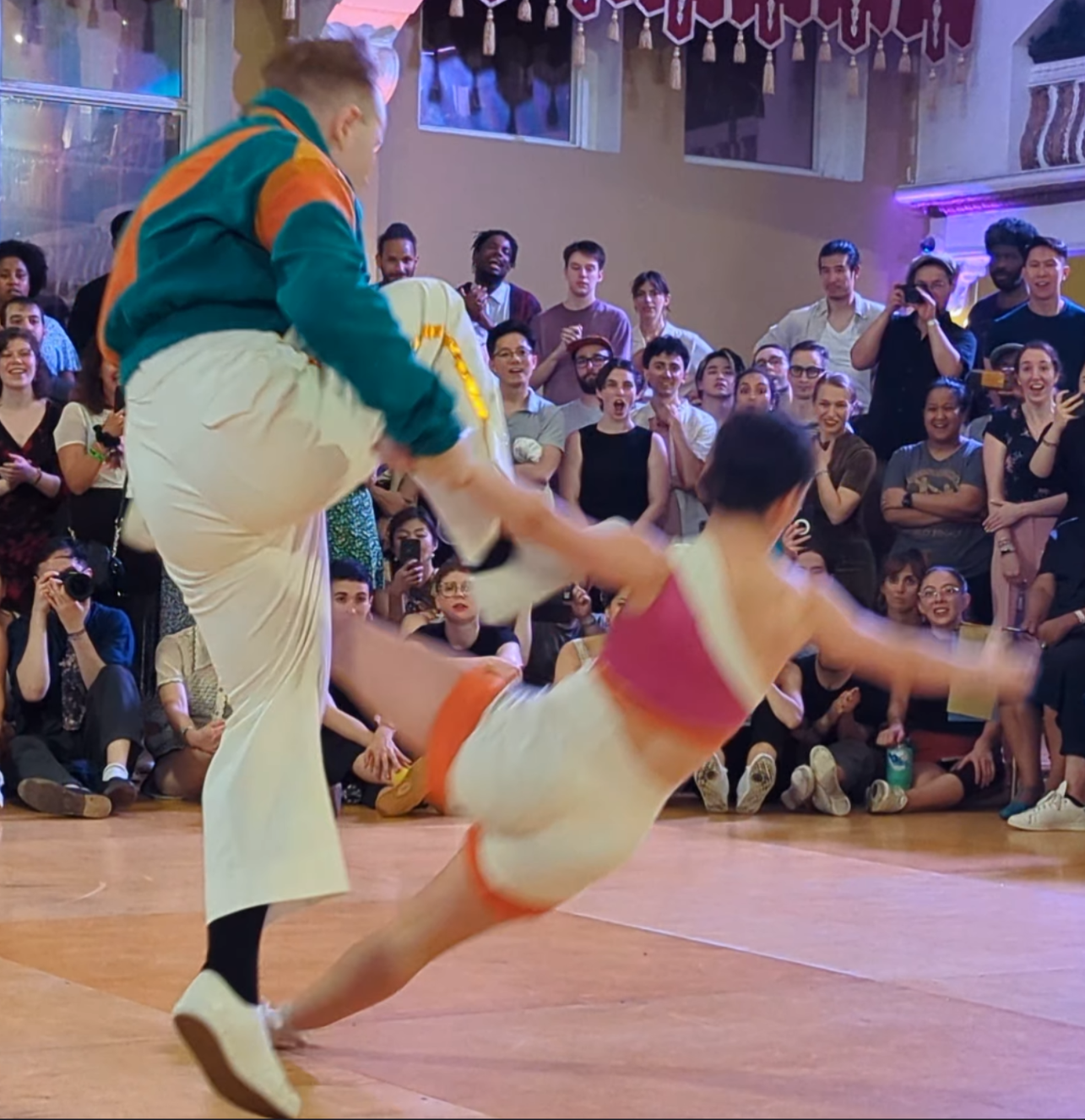

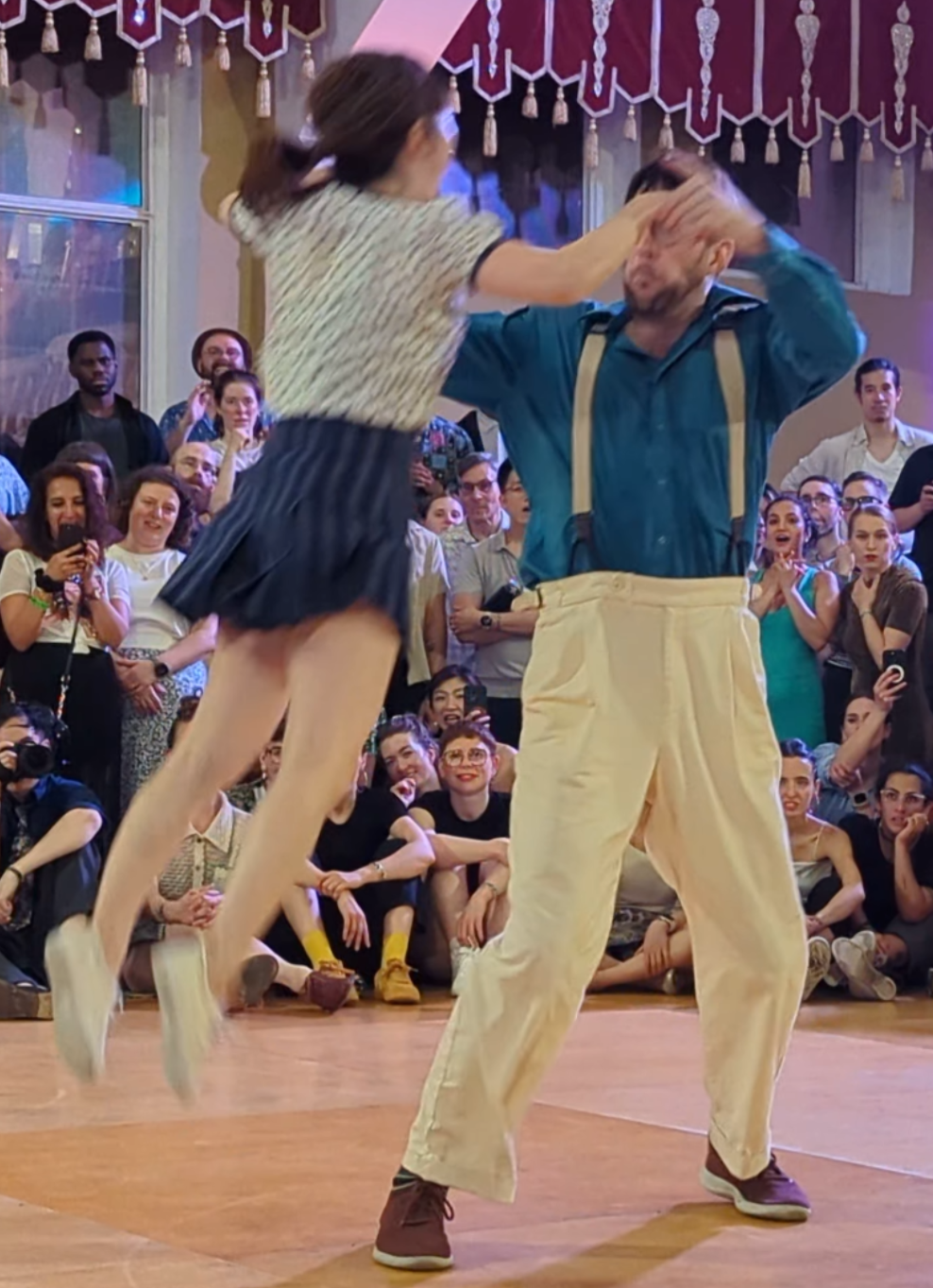

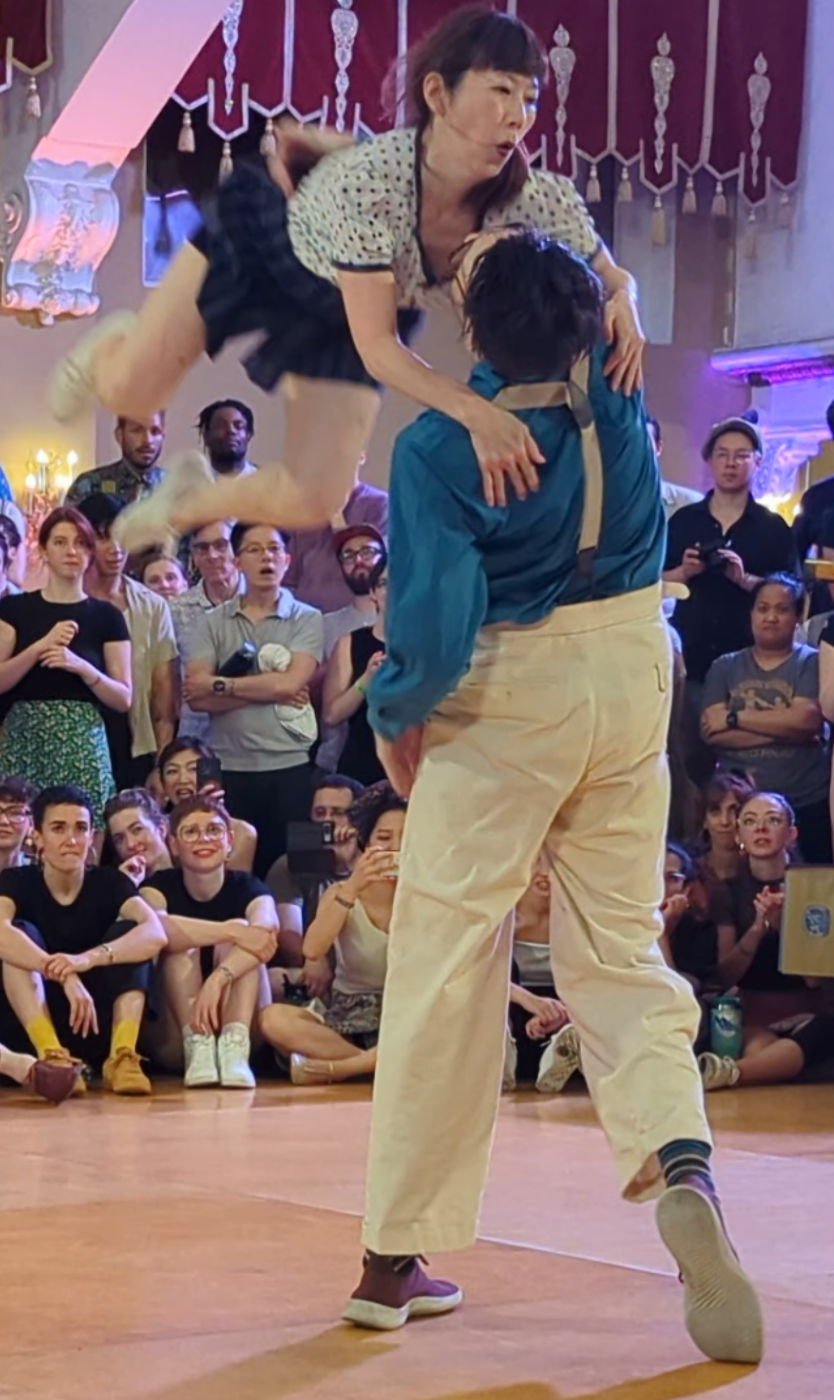

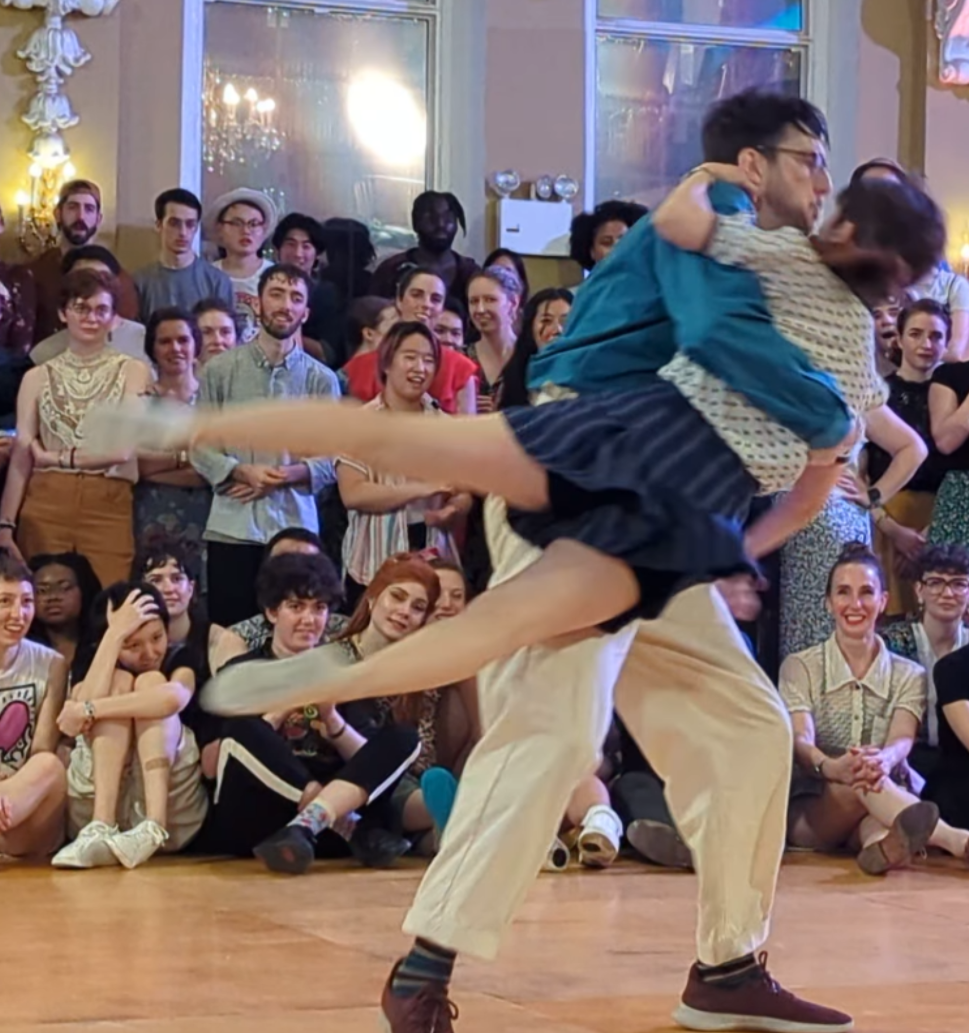

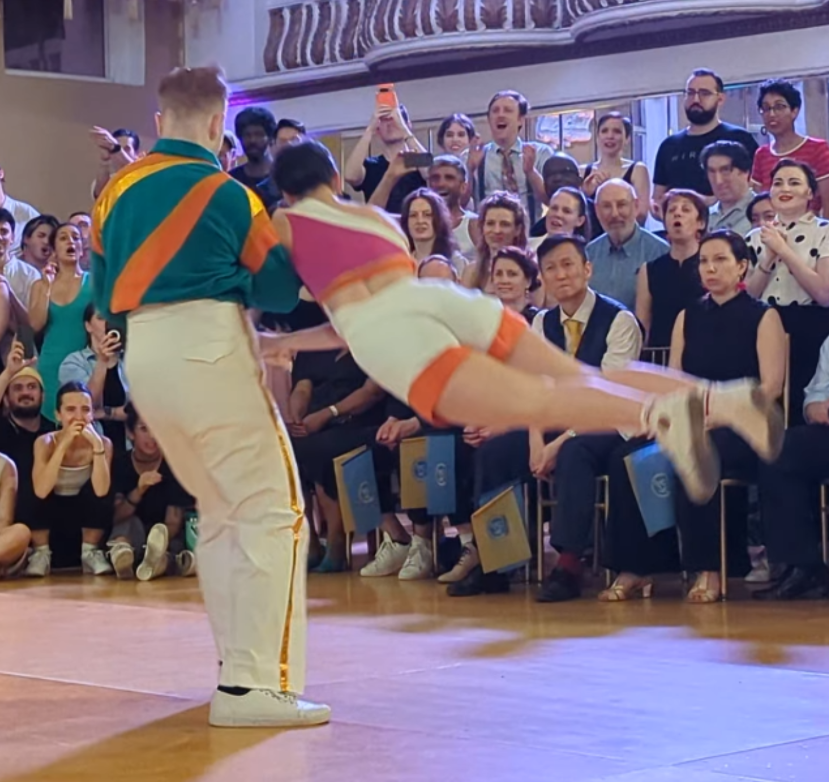

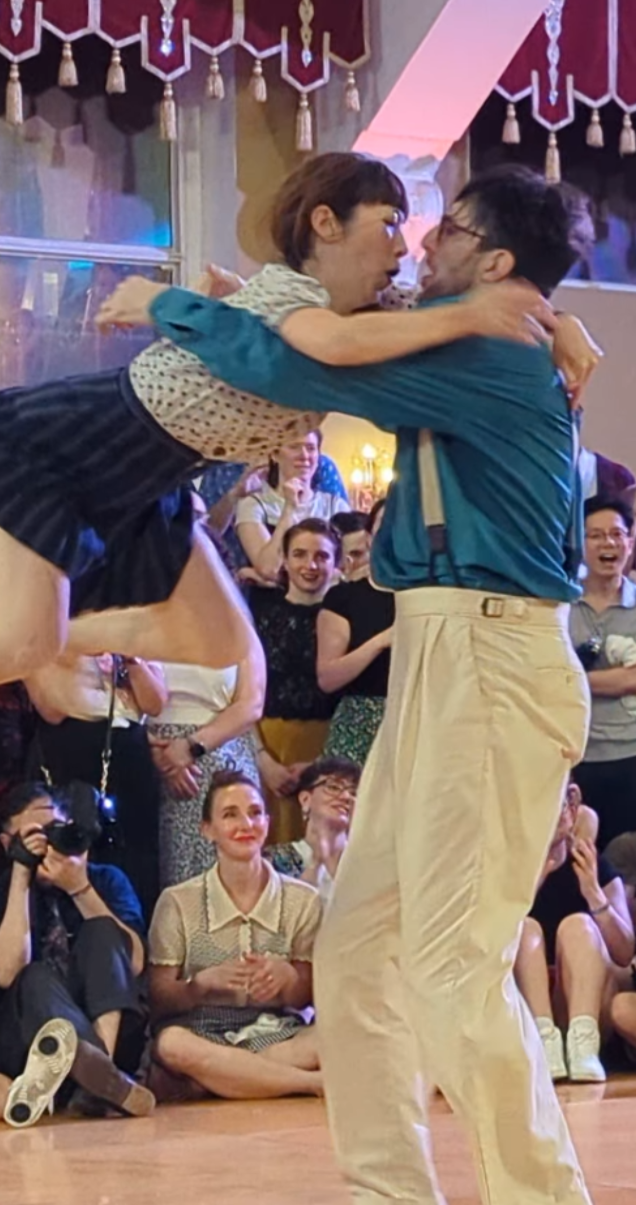

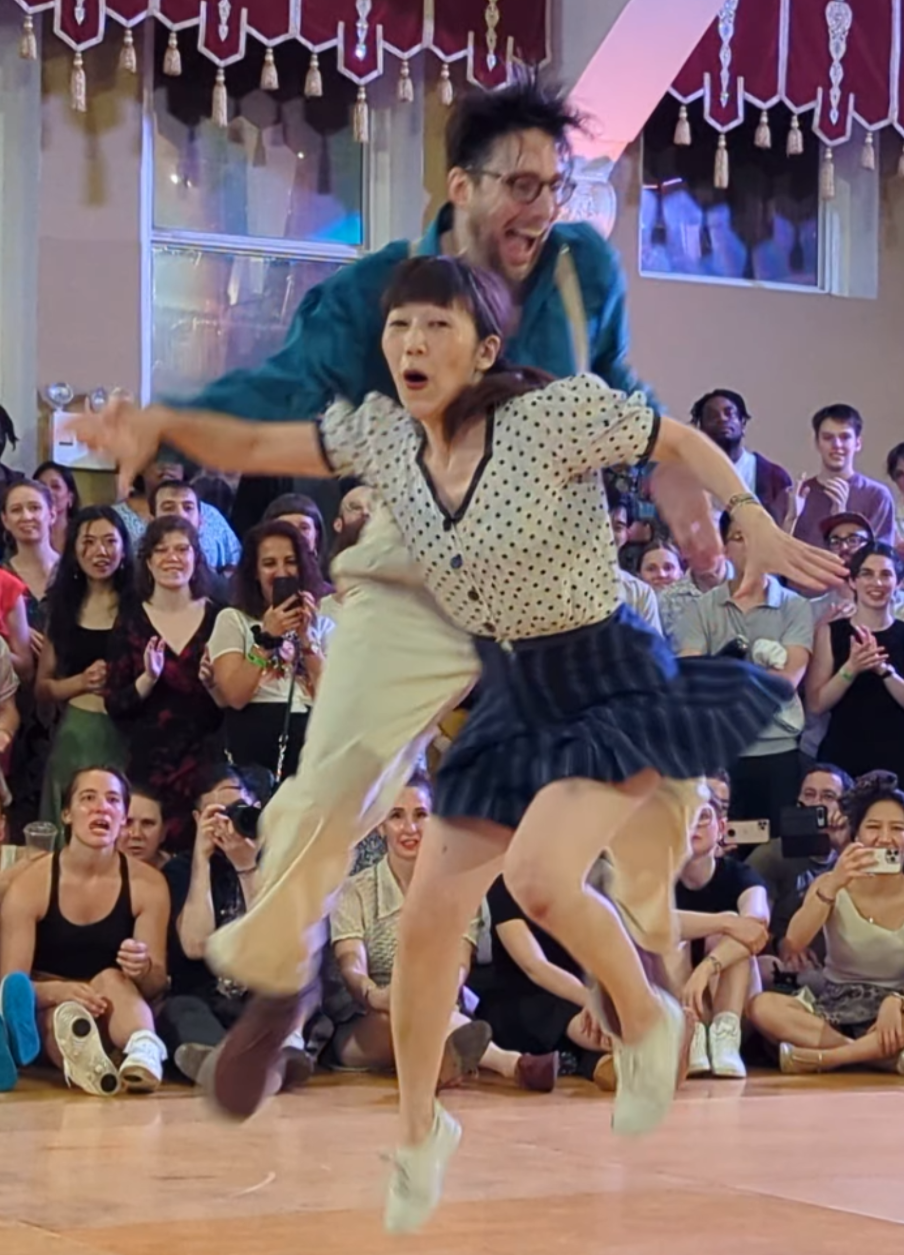
