= Möhlmann =

Möhlmann or Moehlmann is a German surname literally meaning someone who worked or lived at a mill. Variants: Mollmann, de:Möllmann, Mohlman, etc.

Notable people with the surname include:

- Benno Möhlmann (born 1954), German footballer and manager
- Gerrit Möhlmann (born 1950), Dutch cyclist
- Nicholas Moehlmann (born 1938), American politician
- Pleuni Möhlmann (born 1984), Dutch cyclist
