= Hollywood style =

Hollywood style may refer to:

- The style of Classical Hollywood cinema
- The Hollywood-style Lindy Hop
