= Swingout =

Dance move of Lindy Hop

A couple swinging out in Belgium

The swingout is the defining dance move of Lindy Hop.

The swingout evolved from the breakaway, which in turn evolved from the Texas Tommy. The first documented mention of the swingout pattern that resembles breakaway was in 1911, to describe a "Texas Tommy Swing" show done at the Fairmont Hotel in San Francisco. Its variants are used in Jive, East Coast Swing, West Coast Swing and Modern Jive.

== See also ==
- Swing (dance)
