= Sylvia Sykes =

Sylvia Sykes is an American swing dancer, instructor, judge, and choreographer. She is known for reviving the swing dance style balboa.

== Career ==
Sykes and her dance partner Jonathan Bixby started dancing together when she was fourteen years old. They were staff dancers for the television show Shebang during the 1960s. She has studied with many of the dance greats, including Frankie Manning, Dean Collins (1981 to 1984), Maxie Dorf (1984 to 1987), and Willie Desatoff.

Sykes has performed with Count Basie, Glenn Miller, Artie Shaw, and Les Brown. She has appeared on the television shows American Bandstand and Gotta Dance.

She and Bixby represented the U.S. in the World Boogie Woogie Championships in Grenoble, France. She has been head judge for many national swing events as well as being a teacher on how to judge. Following the retirement of Bixby, Sykes taught in Santa Barbara, California, and at workshops around the world including Herräng Dance Camp. In August 2008, she joined Nina Gilkenson and Tena Morales in founding the International Lindy Hop Championships.

== Awards and honors ==
She is an inductee into the National Swing Dance Hall of Fame and the California Swing Dance Hall of Fame. She is a U.S. Open champion, was the NASDE top point winner, two time California Balboa Champion, took third place in the National Carolina Shag Dance Championships, and won many Strictly Swing and Jack and Jill dance contests through the U.S. in Lindy Hop, balboa, and West Coast Swing. She was twice voted Swing Dance Teacher of the Year and is a four-time Feather Award winner as Best Female Lindy Dancer or Teacher in the U.S.

== See also ==
- List of dancers
