= Skippy Blair =

American ballroom dancer (1924–2021)

Skippy Blair (March 15, 1924 – June 30, 2021) was an American ballroom dancer credited with popularizing "West Coast Swing." Blair was a member of a group that successfully lobbied the State Legislature in 1988 to have West Coast Swing designated as the official State Dance of California. She was also the founder of the Golden State Dance Teachers Association and a co-founder of the World Swing Dance Council.

Blair danced in the 1975 film Queen of the Stardust Ballroom.

In 1994, she was inducted into the National Swing Dance Hall of Fame. Her students include US Open champions Jordan Frisbee and Tatiana Mollmann.

Blair created the Universal Unit System, a complete system of dance notation that allows dancers to "read" a dance much like musicians read music.

== Bibliography ==
- Skippy Blair on Contemporary Social Dance: Disco to Tango and Back/Plus Teacher's Breakdown for the Universal Unit System. Golden State Dance Teachers Association. 1978. ISBN 978-0-932-98001-4.
- Dance terminology notebook. Alterra. 1995. ISBN 978-0-932-98011-3.
- Dance Power: Own the Experience. Golden State Dance Teachers Association. 1999. ISBN 978-0-932-98024-3.
- Retro Swing: Dancing to the Big Band Sound. Human Kinetics. ISBN 978-0-736-03244-5.
