= Jewel McGowan =

American dancer

Jewel McGowan (1921-1962) is best known as a dancer of Lindy Hop, a form of swing dance, in the 1940s and 1950s. She also danced in other, non-swing films, and with modern jazz dance pioneer Jack Cole. She is known among dance aficionados as the frequent partner of dancer Dean Collins. McGowan was considered by her fellow Los Angeles dancers to be the best female swing dancer who ever lived. In addition to their social dancing, Collins and McGowan appeared together as dancers in films of the era. They were partners for 11 years. McGowan is especially known for her hip swivels.

== Selected filmography ==
- Buck Privates (1941), partner Dean Collins
- Playmates (1941), partner Dean Collins
- Dance Hall (1941), partner Dean Collins
- Ride 'Em Cowboy (1942), partner Dean Collins
- Springtime in the Rockies (1942), partner Dean Collins
- The Talk of the Town (1942), partner Dean Collins
- Always a Bridesmaid (1943), partner Dean Collins
- Young Ideas (1943), jitterbug dancer
- The Powers Girl (1943), partner Dean Collins (famous for dancing in the rain with an umbrella)
- Kid Dynamite (1943), partner Dean Collins
- Living It Up (1954), partner Dean Collins
- Dean and Jewel also appeared in a few short films such as "Chool Song," and Jewel appeared solo in the short "Hilo Hattie" doing the hula in a grass skirt.

== Television documentaries ==
- In the Kingdom of Swing (1993), partner Dean Collins (on Benny Goodman)

== Honors ==
- California Swing Dance Hall of Fame (1990), Stellar Star Award

== See also ==
- List of dancers
