= Pepsi Bethel =

American jazz dancer and choreographer (1918-2002)

Alfred "Pepsi" Bethel (August 31, 1918, Greensboro, North Carolina – August 30, 2002, New York City) was a jazz dancer, choreographer, and leader of his own dance troupe, the Pepsi Bethel Authentic Jazz Dance Theater, which he founded in 1960.

== Career ==
He began his career with dances like the Cakewalk, Lindy hop, and Charleston at the Savoy Ballroom in Harlem, and worked with the Mura Dehn Jazz Ballet and other companies before forming his own troupe. He is known for choreographing the Lindy Hop jazz routine Tranky Doo.

Bethel worked as a consultant and choreographer on several shows directed by Vernel Bagneris, including two productions of One Mo' Time, Staggerlee (1987) and Jelly Roll! (1994). In 1980, his work as a choreographer was honored in Celebration of Men in Dance at the Thelma Hill Performing Arts Center in Brooklyn. Four years later, he staged the revue An Evening With Charles Cook and Friends at Aaron Davis Hall and was a production consultant Sing Hallelujah! at the Village Gate in 1987.

== Death ==
He died the day before his 84th birthday in New York City.
