= Frankie Manning =

American dancer and choreographer (1914–2009)

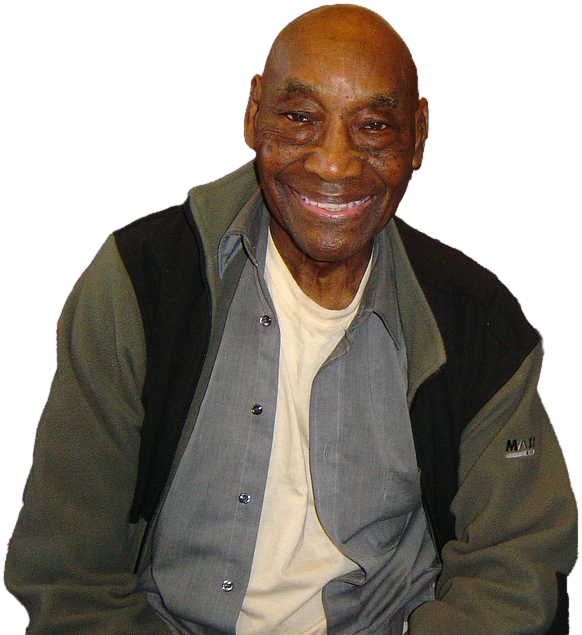
- Manning in 2008
- Born: Frank Manning; May 26, 1914; Jacksonville, Florida, U.S.
- Died: April 27, 2009 (aged 94); New York City, U.S.
- Resting place: Woodlawn Cemetery; The Bronx, New York, U.S.
- Other name: "Musclehead" Manning
- Occupations: Choreographer, dancer
- Children: Chazz Young; Marion Manning; Frankie Manning Jr.
- Awards: Tony Award for Best Choreography; 1989 Black and Blue
- Website: frankiemanning.com

Frank Manning (May 26, 1914 – April 27, 2009) was an American dancer, instructor and choreographer, who is considered one of the founders of Lindy Hop, an energetic form of the jazz dance style known as swing.

== Biography ==
Manning was born in Jacksonville, Florida on May 26, 1914. After his parents separated when he was three years old, he moved to Harlem with his mother, who was a dancer.

He began dancing as a child. Manning's mother sent him to spend summers with his father, aunt, and grandmother on their farm in Aiken, South Carolina. On Saturdays, farmhands and locals would come to the farm to play music on the front porch with harmonicas and a washtub bass. Manning's grandmother encouraged Frankie to dance with the others.

In October 1927, Manning attended the Renaissance Ballroom & Casino. Watching from the balcony, he saw his mother dancing formal ballroom styles such as the foxtrot and waltz, having only seen her dance before in a much looser and casual style at neighborhood rent parties. Manning started listening to records on a Victrola in his bedroom and would practice dancing with a broom or a chair. When he was older, he started going to Harlem's Savoy Ballroom, the only integrated ballroom in New York. He frequented the Savoy in the 1930s, eventually becoming a dancer in the elite and prestigious "Cat's Corner," a corner of the dance floor where impromptu exhibitions and competitions took place. During a dance contest in 1935, Manning and his partner, Frieda Washington, performed the first aerial in a swing dance competition against George Snowden, the inventor of the term Lindy Hop, and his partner, Big Bea. The air step he performed was a "back-to-back roll" and was danced while Chick Webb played "Down South Camp Meeting" at Manning's request.

=== Career ===
In 1935, Herbert White organized the top Lindy Hop dancers at the Savoy Ballroom into a professional performance group that was eventually named Whitey's Lindy Hoppers. Manning created the troupe's first ensemble routines and functioned as the group's de facto choreographer, although he was never officially credited with that title. The troupe toured extensively and made several films. While with Whitey's, Manning danced with Norma Miller, who became known as the Queen of Swing. Whitey's Lindy Hoppers disbanded around World War II when many of the male dancers entered the armed forces. Manning himself served in the U.S. Army. In 1947, after the war, Manning formed a four-person dance group called the Congaroos. Across England and South America the group performed, also making an appearance in the 1948 film Killer Diller. When the Congaroos disbanded in 1955, Manning quietly settled into a career with the United States Postal Service.

=== Return to Lindy Hop ===
In 1982, Al Minns, a former member of Whitey's Lindy Hoppers, started to teach Lindy Hop at the Sandra Cameron Dance Center. Before he died in 1985, he told his students that Manning, another surviving member of Whitey's Lindy Hoppers, also lived in New York City.

In 1986, dancers Erin Stevens and Steven Mitchell contacted Manning and asked him to teach them the Lindy Hop. Mitchell and Stevens returned to California and helped to spread Lindy Hop to the West Coast and other areas of the U.S. That same year, Lennart Westerlund contacted Manning and invited him to Sweden to work with The Rhythm Hot Shots. Manning traveled to Sweden in 1987 and returned there every year from 1989 onward to teach at the Herräng Dance Camp. Later, Manning would also teach Ryan Francois, who would help introduce Lindy Hop to a British audience.

=== Later years ===
Once the swing dance and Lindy Hop revival took hold during the late 1980s, Manning taught Lindy Hop around the world, occasionally appearing with Norma Miller. Sometimes, dance workshops returned him to places he had not been in decades. For example, Manning first visited Melbourne, Australia in 1939 to perform at the Princess Theatre. The swing revival and Melbourne's Swing Patrol brought him back again in 2002; it was his first visit to Melbourne in 63 years.

At age 75, Manning co-choreographed the Broadway musical Black and Blue, for which he received a 1989 Tony Award. In 2000, he was a recipient of a National Heritage Fellowship from the National Endowment for the Arts, which is the United States' highest honor in the folk and traditional arts.

Manning's autobiography, Frankie Manning: Ambassador of Lindy Hop, written with co-author Cynthia R. Millman, was published by Temple University Press in May 2007.

Manning's annual birthday celebrations attracted dancers and instructors from all over the world. His 80th birthday, in 1994, was commemorated by a weekend-long celebration in New York City; his 85th culminated in a sold-out party at New York's Roseland Ballroom, where a pair of his dance shoes were placed in a showcase along with those of dancers such as Fred Astaire. Dedicated cruises were organized for his 89th and 90th birthdays; for his birthday dances, Manning followed his custom of dancing with one woman for every year of his life. He continued this custom through his 94th birthday.

=== Death ===
A resident of Corona, Queens, Manning died in Manhattan on April 27, 2009, at the age of 94.

He is interred in the Hillcrest Plot at Woodlawn Cemetery in Bronx, New York.

== Legacy ==
=== Frankie Manning Foundation ===
Manning died one month before his 95th birthday. His planned birthday celebration was recast as Frankie 95, a celebration of Manning's life, and drew more than 2,000 people from 33 countries. Proceeds from the five-day Frankie 95 celebration were used to create the Frankie Manning Foundation. Its mission is to spread Lindy Hop throughout the world.

=== Accolades ===
Frankie 100 took place in New York City from May 22 to 26, 2014. The event was described as the largest swing dance event of the modern era and brought together over 2000 dancers from 47 countries to honor Frankie Manning and to name his birthday, May 26, as World Lindy Hop Day.

Manning was inducted into the National Museum of Dance and Hall of Fame in 2009. He was inducted into the U.S. Swing Dance Council (now World Swing Dance Council) Hall of Fame in 1992.

On July 4, 2012, a road in the village of Herräng, Sweden, was named after Manning, as a gift from the municipality of Norrtälje for the 30-year jubilee of Herräng Dance Camp.

On May 26, 2016, Google celebrated his 102nd birthday with a Google Doodle.

== Filmography ==
- Radio City Revels (1938)
- Keep Punching (1939)
- Hellzapoppin' (1941)
- Hot Chocolates (1941)
- Jittering Jitterbugs (1943)
- Killer Diller (1948)
- Malcolm X (1992) – choreography
- Stompin' at the Savoy (1992) – choreography
- Jazz: A Film by Ken Burns (2000)
- Frankie Manning: Never Stop Swinging (2009)

== See also ==
- Savoy-style Lindy Hop
- African-American dance
- History of Lindy Hop
- List of dancers
