= Queen of the Stardust Ballroom =

1975 American television musical drama film

- Original broadcast poster
- Genre: Drama; Romance
- Screenplay by: Jerome Kass
- Directed by: Sam O'Steen
- Starring: Maureen Stapleton; Charles Durning
- Composer: Billy Goldenberg
- Country of origin: United States
- Original language: English

Production
- Executive producer: Roger Gimbel
- Production locations: Elmhurst, Queens, New York City; Hollywood, Los Angeles, California; Jackson Heights, Queens, New York City; Myron's Ballroom - 1024 South Grand Avenue, Downtown, Los Angeles; Pasadena, California; South Pasadena, California; San Pedro, Los Angeles, California; Woodhaven, Queens, New York City; Woodside, Queens, New York City
- Cinematography: David M. Walsh
- Editor: William H. Ziegler
- Running time: 98 minutes
- Production company: Tomorrow Entertainment

Original release
- Network: CBS
- Release: February 13, 1975

Related
- Ballroom

Queen of the Stardust Ballroom is an American musical television movie directed by Sam O'Steen and produced by Roger Gimbel, from the teleplay by Jerome Kass. It was broadcast by CBS on February 13, 1975. Maureen Stapleton, Charles Durning, and Charlotte Rae were nominated for Emmy Awards for their performances.

== Plot ==
Bea Asher (Stapleton) is a lonely widow who is told by a waitress named Angie to get out and enjoy life. Angie takes a nervous Bea to the Stardust Ballroom, a local dance hall, for ballroom dancing. Despite Bea stating it has been years since she has danced, Al Green (Durning) asks her to dance. When Bea returns home late, her worried sister Helen (Rae) arrives, having already disturbed Bea's daughter. Bea decides to be her own person now, takes on a more youthful appearance, and frequents the Stardust to dance with Al. This starts a romance. Bea also learns of Al's life off the dance floor. He is married, albeit unhappily, but she so enjoys their time together that it doesn't bother her. Bea's new lifestyle leads her to become the annual queen at the Stardust.

== Cast ==
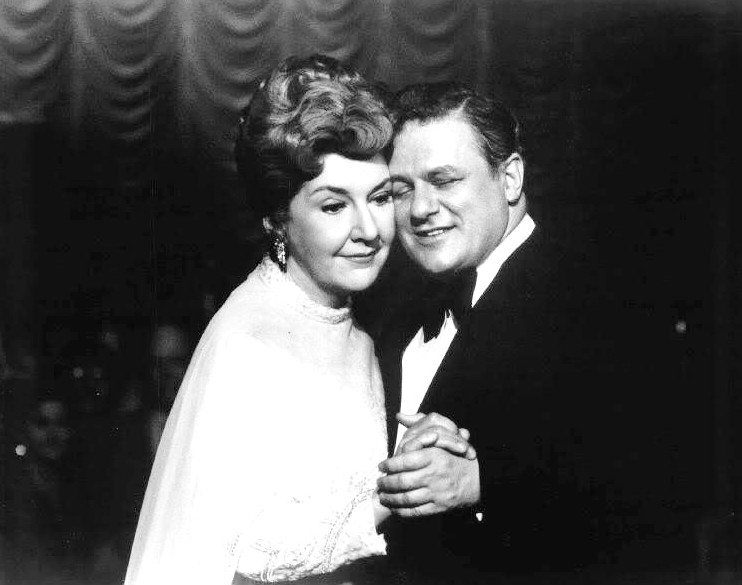
Maureen Stapleton and Charles Durning

- Maureen Stapleton as Bea Asher: a New York widow who opens a thrift store to sell items in her house to keep from having to move in with her daughter Diane and her family. Her life soon changes when she is taken to the Stardust Ballroom.
- Charles Durning as Al Green: a married mailman who frequents the Stardust. He asks Bea to dance and falls in love with her.
- Michael Brandon as David Asher: Bea's son who helps her open the store then moves with his family to Los Angeles
- Michael Strong as Jack: Helen's husband and Bea's accountant
- Charlotte Rae as Helen: Bea's sister, who dislikes the changes in her
- Jacquelyn Hyde as Angie: Bea's waitress friend, who, in showing her how to live life, takes her to the Stardust
- Beverly Sanders as Diane: Bea's daughter, who also dislikes the changes in her
- Alan Fudge as Louis: Diane's husband
- Florence Halop as Sylvia
- Gil Lamb as Harry: Bea's first dance partner at the Stardust. Feeling overmatched, she excuses herself from the dance.
- Nora Marlowe as Emily
- Orrin Tucker as M.C.

== Music and dance ==
Billy Goldenberg composed the music for the film. Alan and Marilyn Bergman wrote the lyrics for the songs used in the film, most of which were sung by the two leads, except for a solo by Martha Tilton. The dance sequences were choreographed by Marge Champion and were filmed in Myron's Ballroom in Los Angeles with some 300 regular patrons, including Dean Collins, Skippy Blair, Larry Kern, and Laure Haile appearing as extras.

== Awards ==
O'Steen won the Directors Guild of America award for Outstanding Directorial Achievement in Specials, and the Writers Guild of America honored Kass for his original teleplay. The program received two Emmys, for Outstanding Achievement in Choreography and Outstanding Achievement in Cinematography for a Special.

== Legacy ==
The program, which has been released in VHS, DVD, and Blu-ray formats, served as the basis for the 1978 Broadway musical Ballroom.
