= Dean Collins (dancer) =

American dancer, instructor, and choreographer

Dean Collins (born Sol Ruddosky; May 29, 1917 – June 1, 1984) was an American dancer, instructor, choreographer, and swing dance innovator. He is widely credited with bringing the Lindy Hop from New York to Southern California and significantly influencing the development of West Coast Swing. Collins appeared in over thirty films and performed both live and on television.

== Biography ==
Collins grew up in Newark, New Jersey, where he began learning to dance at the age of 13 from his two older sisters. He participated in amateur dance contests across New Jersey and frequently danced at the Savoy Ballroom in Harlem, New York. In 1935, The New Yorker magazine honored him as "Dancer of the Year."

Collins moved to Los Angeles in 1936. During the day, he worked as a janitor at Simon's Drive-In Diner, and at night he danced at the Diana Ballroom and Casino Gardens. Concerned that his Jewish surname might hinder his career, he adopted the name "Dean Collins" from a wallet he found.

He won his first major dance contest in California at the Palomar Ballroom, showcasing his Savoy-style dance, which was virtually unknown to Californians at the time. The dominant local dances, such as the Camel Hop and Balboa, quickly fell out of favor as Dean’s East Coast Jitterbug gained popularity. He began teaching his version of Savoy-style Lindy Hop, which eventually paved the way for what is now known as West Coast Swing, a modern form of swing dance.

West Coast Swing later became the official state dance of California, with Collins credited as one of its inadvertent creators. To distinguish between the original and modern forms of West Coast Swing, the early version is sometimes referred to as "Hollywood Style," heavily influenced by Collins’ dance style as seen in films. However, many 1950s movie credits misleadingly labeled this style as "Rock and Roll."

Collins’ contest-winning style became widely recognized in Los Angeles, particularly at venues like the Casino Gardens and the Diana Ballroom.

Collins’ career took off when he was hired by RKO Pictures to choreograph the dancing for Let's Make Music, a film shot in 1939 and released in 1940. In 1942, he appeared in the Soundie The Chool Song, released on March 23, 1942. He and his partner were billed as "Collins and Colette," with music recorded by Spike Jones.

Over his career, Collins danced in or choreographed nearly forty Hollywood films. Notable appearances include Hellzapoppin' (1941), Dance Hall (1941), Playmates (1941), Buck Privates (1941), Ride 'Em Cowboy (1942), Springtime in the Rockies (1942), The Talk of the Town (1942), Always a Bridesmaid (1943), Kid Dynamite (1943), Junior Prom (1945), and Living It Up (1954).

In the 1950s and 1960s, Collins taught swing dancing in Los Angeles. His students included notable figures such as Shirley Temple, Joan Crawford, Cesar Romero, Abbott and Costello, Jonathan Bixby, Sylvia Sykes, Lila Desatoff, and Arthur Murray.

The "Collins style" seen in Hollywood films later became the foundation for what was referred to in the 1990s as Hollywood-style Lindy Hop.

Dean Collins and his style of Lindy Hop played a significant role in influencing and shaping various other dance styles, including Houston Push, Dallas Whip, St. Louis Imperial Swing, Washington D.C. Hand Dancing, Carolina Shag, Collegiate Shag, St. Louis Shag, Balboa and Bal-Swing, Ballroom Swing, East Coast Swing, Jitterbug, Jive, and Ballroom Jive.

Collins also created a unique version of the Shim Sham, designed as a three-man performance. This version was not widely taught or shared. The original performers included Collins, Jack Arkin, and Johnny Mattox. Later, Bobby Hefner and Bart Bartolo also performed this rendition.

Jewel McGowan, hailed by her contemporaries as the "greatest female swing dancer," was Dean Collins' dance partner for eleven years. She appeared alongside him in films such as Buck Privates (1941) and Ride 'Em Cowboy (1942). Together, they were affectionately known as the "Fred and Ginger of Lindy Hop."

In the 1960s and 1970s, he continued to dance to various styles of music, as long as it "swung."

Dean Collins married his wife, Mary, and the couple settled in Glendale, California, where he remained highly active in the swing dance community until his death in 1984. Mary believed that Dean contributed to a smoothed-out swing dance style that eliminated the traditional bounce.

When asked if her husband was responsible for the emergence of West Coast Swing, Mary responded, “Dean insisted that there were only two kinds of swing dancing – good and bad.” According to jazz dance researcher Peter Loggins, Dean’s style evolved over the decades, but near the end of his life, he returned to the Lindy Hop he had learned at the Savoy Ballroom in the 1930s.

The "Collins style," as seen in Hollywood films, later became the foundation for what was referred to in the 1990s as Hollywood-style Lindy Hop. Reflecting on the dedication of dancers during his era, Dean once remarked, “Young people in those days took their dancing very seriously. They spent much time with their partner, learned the steps, invented new ones.”
