= George Snowden =

African-American dancer (1904–1982)

Snowden in the clip After Seben

George "Shorty" Snowden (July 4, 1904 – May 1982) was an African American dancer in Harlem during the 1920s and 1930s. Snowden was best known for his improvisational dance style.

Snowden and his partner Mattie Purnell invented the Harlem Lindy Hop in the dance marathon at Harlem's Rockland Palace between June and July 1928. Snowden and Purnell's invention was based on the breakaway pattern which they practically rediscovered via an accident in the dance marathon. There existed various Lindy Hop dances around the U.S. since Charles Lindbergh's flight over the Atlantic Ocean in May 1927, which were not connected to the Harlem dance. The Harlem Lindy Hop was not the first of the Lindy Hop dances, but it was probably the only one which survived in the long run.

Snowden is sometimes inaccurately credited with coining the name 'Lindy Hop' for a popular partner jazz dance of the day. As there is evidence for his role in creating the Lindy Hop, there is no proper evidence for the naming of the dance. The term ‘Lindy Hop’ in connection with Snowden and Purnell's invention was used for the first time in public in September 1928 when Snowden was advertised to perform in the Lincoln Theatre in Harlem. Whether it was Snowden or someone else who named the Lindy Hop for the newspaper advertisement is unclear.

After the dance marathon, Snowden became a popular dancer at the Savoy Ballroom in Harlem, New York, and around the United States when he with his dance group were the first Savoy Lindy Hoppers who took the Lindy Hop to competitions, ballrooms, night clubs, and Broadway plays like Blackbirds (1930) and Singing the Blues (1931) after his groundbreaking invention, and appears in the film After Seben (1929). He can also be seen in the film Ask Uncle Sol (1937), dancing with his most famous partner Big Bea.

The Shorty George in the Lindy Hop repertoire is named for Snowden. A man of diminutive height, he used his size for comic effect. With his partner Big Bea (Beatrice Gay), Snowden would often out-dance other couples in dance competitions of the day, and was a member of a number of significant dance troupes, including the Shorty Snowden Dancers, which has been credited as the first Lindy Hop dance troupe. His troupe would go on to perform with the Paul Whiteman Orchestra.

== Film tribute by Fred Astaire and Rita Hayworth ==
Rita Hayworth and Fred Astaire paid tribute to Snowden in their epic "Shorty George" number (music by Jerome Kern, lyrics by Johnny Mercer), intermittently squatting down as they danced to look shorter, in the 1942 film You Were Never Lovelier.
