= Tatiana Mollmann =

American professional dancer

- Born: February 1, 1983 (age 43)
- Occupation: Professional dancer
- Years active: 1996–present
- Known for: West Coast Swing; partnership with Jordan Frisbee
- Notable work: Star Search, 30 Seconds to Fame, Good Morning America, The Polar Express, Love N' Dancing
- Partners: Parker Dearborn (1996–1997); Shiloh Warren (1998–1999); Jordan Frisbee (2000–2023)

Tatiana Mollmann (born February 1, 1983) is an American professional dancer and has acted and performed on TV shows such as Star Search, 30 Seconds to Fame and Good Morning America.

== Career ==
Mollmann partnered with Parker Dearborn from 1996 to 1997 and with Shiloh Warren from 1998 to 1999. From 2000 to 2023 her partnership with Jordan Frisbee has resulted in several championship awards. They have won 11 West Coast Swing Classic Division Championships. At the UCWDC Worlds event they were given the Star Award for the Couple with the Most Impact on Swing and Frisbee won Best Swing Choreographer.

Mollmann and Frisbee have won Fox TV's "30 Seconds to Fame", appeared twice on CBS TV's "Star Search", danced in the motion picture "The Polar Express", won "America's Best Dance Couple" on ABC TV's "Good Morning America", had speaking roles and danced in the movie "Love N' Dancing". They are certified teachers in the Golden State Dance Teachers Association.

== Awards ==
(with Jordan Frisbee)

- US OPEN Young Adult Champions (2000)
- US OPEN Classic Champions (2001, 2004, 2005, 2006, 2008, 2009, 2011, 2012, 2013, 2014, 2015) - Youngest couple to win (2001)
- Dallas Dance Classic Champions (2003, 2004, 2005, 2006, 2007, 2008)
- USA Grand Nationals Classic Champions (2004, 2005, 2006, 2008, 2009)
- UCWDC World Swing Invitational Champions (2003)
- UCWDC Swing "Impact Dancers of the Year" (2003)
- USA Swing Net "Dance Couple of the Year" (2003, 2004, 2005, 2006, 2007)
