= Breakaway (dance) =

Breakaway (Break-A-Way) was a swing dance, originally a syncopated Two-step. In the Polka, a step called the Coquette (Love Chase) is defined as "The lady escapes from her partner and polkas solo while the gent pursues her, arms akimbo."

The Break-Away was the name of swing before being named the Lindy Hop by Shorty George in 1927. The Breakaway was a cross between the "Texas Tommy, Two-step, Apache Dance, Turkey Trot, Cakewalk and Grizzly Bear".
