= Savoy Ballroom =

Historic Harlem music venue

Coordinates: 40.8175°N 73.9380°W

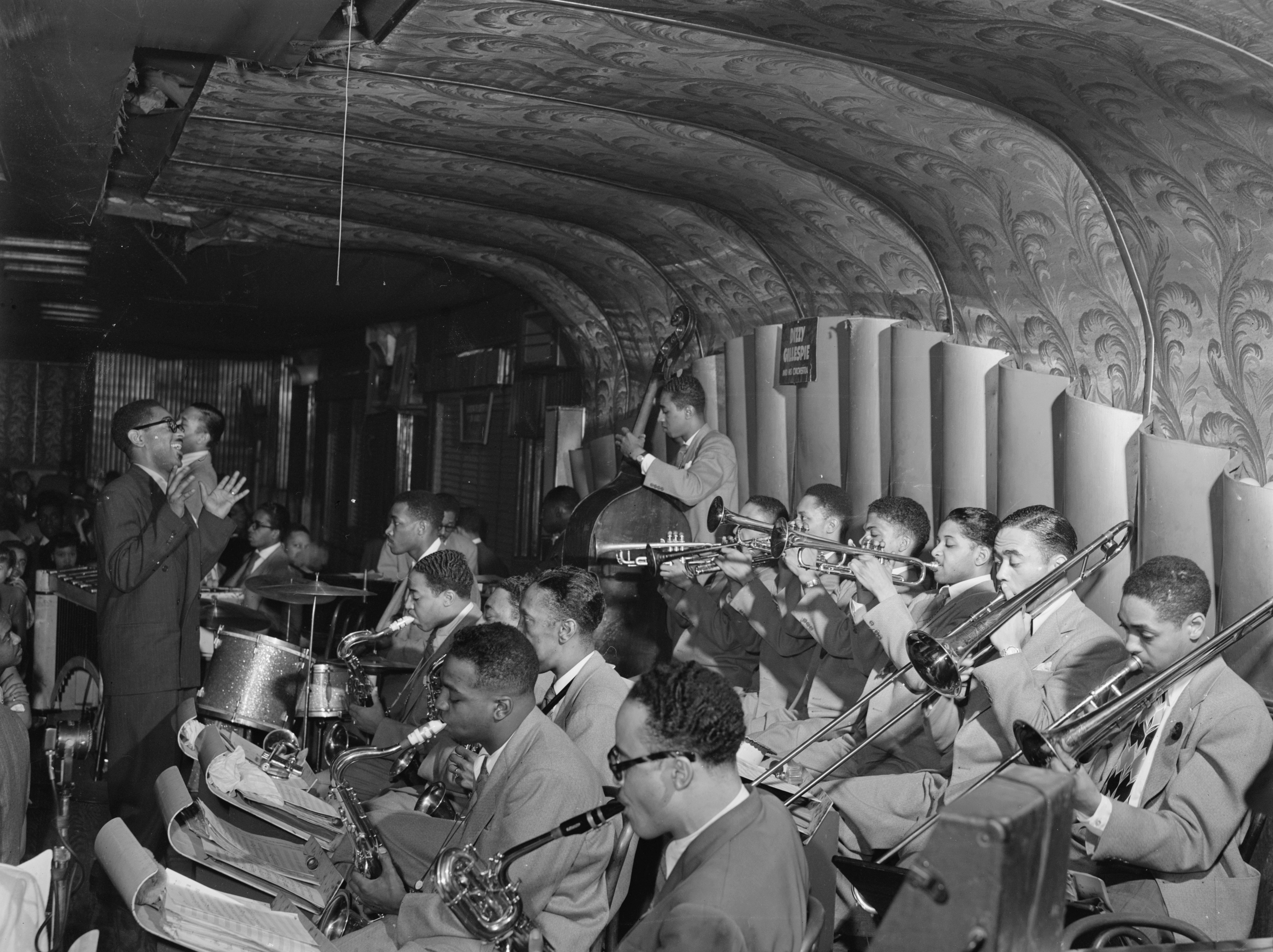
Dizzy Gillespie's Orchestra on the Savoy bandstand, between 1946 and 1948

The Savoy Ballroom was a large ballroom for music and public dancing located at 596 Lenox Avenue, between 140th and 141st Streets in the Harlem neighborhood of Manhattan, New York City. Lenox Avenue was the main thoroughfare through upper Harlem. Poet Langston Hughes calls it the "Heartbeat of Harlem" in Juke Box Love Song, and he set his work "Lenox Avenue: Midnight" on the legendary street. The Savoy was one of many Harlem hot spots along Lenox, but it was the one to be called the "World's Finest Ballroom". It was in operation from March 12, 1926, to July 10, 1958, and as Barbara Englebrecht writes in her article "Swinging at the Savoy", it was "a building, a geographic place, a ballroom, and the 'soul' of a neighborhood". It was opened and owned by white entrepreneur Jay Faggen and Jewish businessman Moe Gale. It was managed by African-American businessman and civic leader Charles Buchanan. Buchanan, who was born in the British West Indies, sought to run a "luxury ballroom to accommodate the many thousands who wished to dance in an atmosphere of tasteful refinement, rather than in the small stuffy halls and the foul smelling, smoke laden cellar nightclubs ..."

== History ==
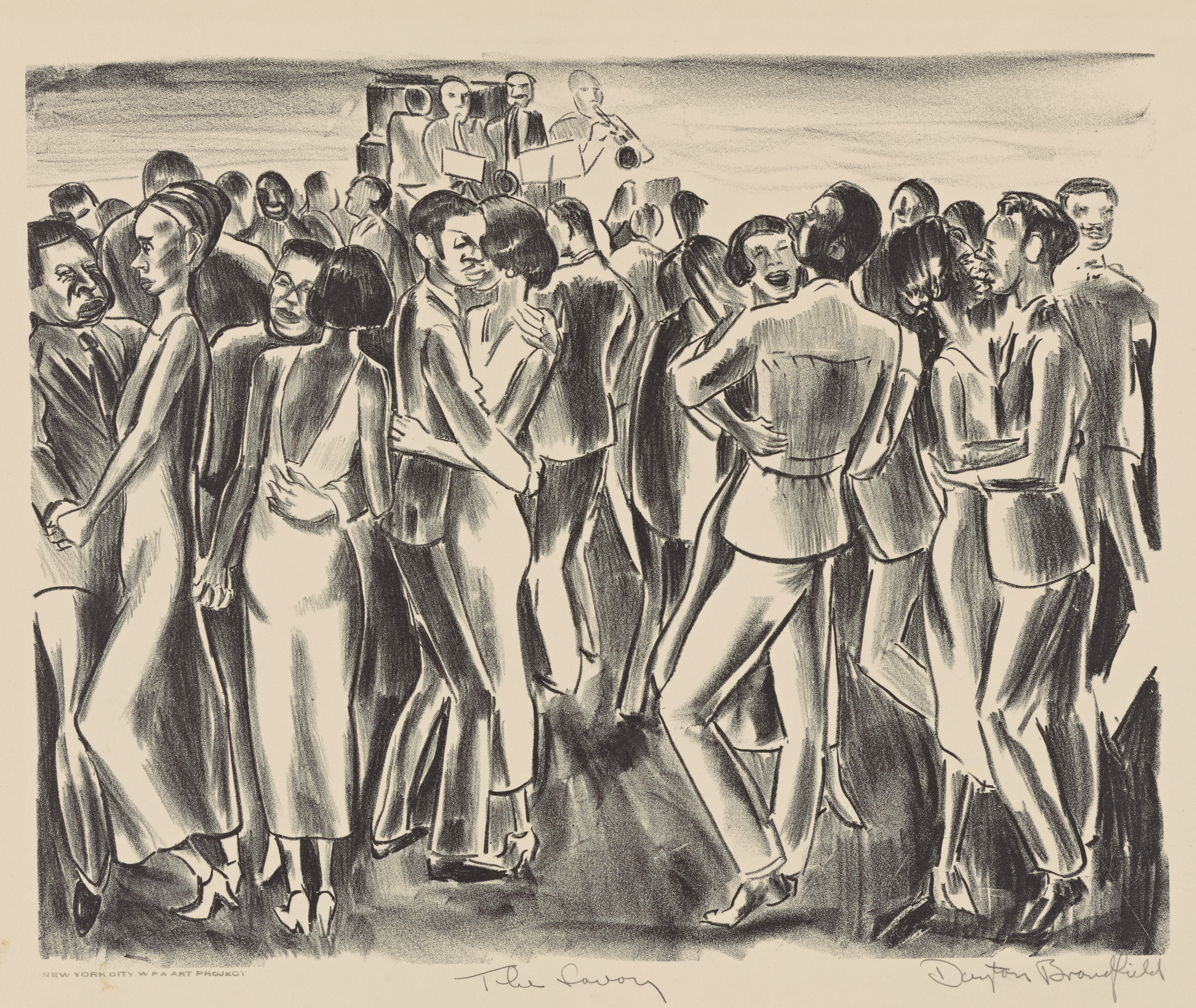
Lithograph of the Savoy created for the New York City Works Progress Administration, 1935–1943

The Savoy was modeled after Faggen's downtown venue, Roseland Ballroom. The Roseland was a mostly European American swing dance club. With swing's rise to popularity and Harlem becoming a connected black community, The Savoy gave black dancers an equally beautiful venue. The ballroom, which was 10,000 square feet in size, was on the second floor and a block long. It could hold up to 4,000 people. The interior was painted pink and the walls were mirrored. Colored lights danced on the sprung layered wood floor. In 1926, the Savoy contained a spacious lobby framing a huge, cut glass chandelier and marble staircase. Leon James is quoted in Jazz Dance as saying, "My first impression was that I had stepped into another world. I had been to other ballrooms, but this was different – much bigger, more glamour, real class ..."

The Savoy Ballroom was named after the Savoy Hotel in London as those who named the ballroom felt this gave the ballroom a classy, upscale feeling, as the hotel is a very elite, upscale hotel.

The Savoy was popular from the start. A headline from the New York Age March 20, 1926, reads "Savoy Turns 2,000 Away On Opening Night – Crowds Pack Ball Room All Week". The ballroom remained lit every night of the week.

The Savoy had the constant presence of the best Lindy Hoppers, known as "Savoy Lindy Hoppers". Occasionally, groups of dancers such as Whitey's Lindy Hoppers turned professional and performed in Broadway and Hollywood productions. Whitey turned out to be a successful agent, and in 1937 the Marx Brothers' movie A Day at the Races featured the group. Herbert White was a bouncer at the Savoy who was made floor manager in the early 1930s. He was sometimes known as Mac, but with his ambition to scout dancers at the ballroom to form his own group, he became widely known as Whitey for the white streak of hair down the center of his head. He looked for dancers who were "young, stylized, and, most of all, they had to have a beat, they had to swing".

Unlike many ballrooms such as the Cotton Club, the Savoy always had a no-discrimination policy. The clientele was 85% black and 15% white, although sometimes there was an even split. Lindy hop dancer Frankie Manning said that patrons were judged on their dancing skills and not on the color of their skin: "One night somebody came over and said, 'Hey man, Clark Gable just walked in the house.' Somebody else said, 'Oh, yeah, can he dance?' All they wanted to know when you came into the Savoy was, do you dance?".

The northeast corner of the dance floor, nicknamed "Cats' Corner," was monopolized by the best and boldest dancers. Some sources claim only Whitey's Lindy Hoppers were permitted to dance there, while others are less specific. Competition for a place in Cats' Corner was fierce, and every serious hopper awaited the nightly "showtime". Other dancers would create a horseshoe around the band and "only the greatest Lindy-hoppers would stay on the floor, to try to eliminate each other".

Many dances such as the Lindy Hop (which was named after Charles Lindbergh and originated in 1927) were developed and became famous there. It was known downtown as the "Home of Happy Feet" but uptown, in Harlem, as "the Track" because the floor was long and thin. The Lindy Hop is also known as The Jitterbug and was born out of "mounting exhilaration and the 'hot' interaction of music and dance". Other dances that were conceived at the Savoy are The Flying Charleston, Jive, Snakehips, Rhumboogie, and variations of the Shimmy and Mambo. Capitol Records released at least one album devoted to the club, The Home of Happy Feet, from 1959.

It is estimated that the ballroom generated $250,000 in annual profit in its peak years from the late 1920s to the 1940s. Every year the ballroom was visited by almost 700,000 people. The entrance fee was 30 to 85 cents per person, depending on what time a person came. Thirty cents was the base price, but after 6 pm the fee was 60 cents, and then 85 cents after 8 pm. The Savoy made enough money by its peak in 1936 that $50,000 was spent on remodeling.

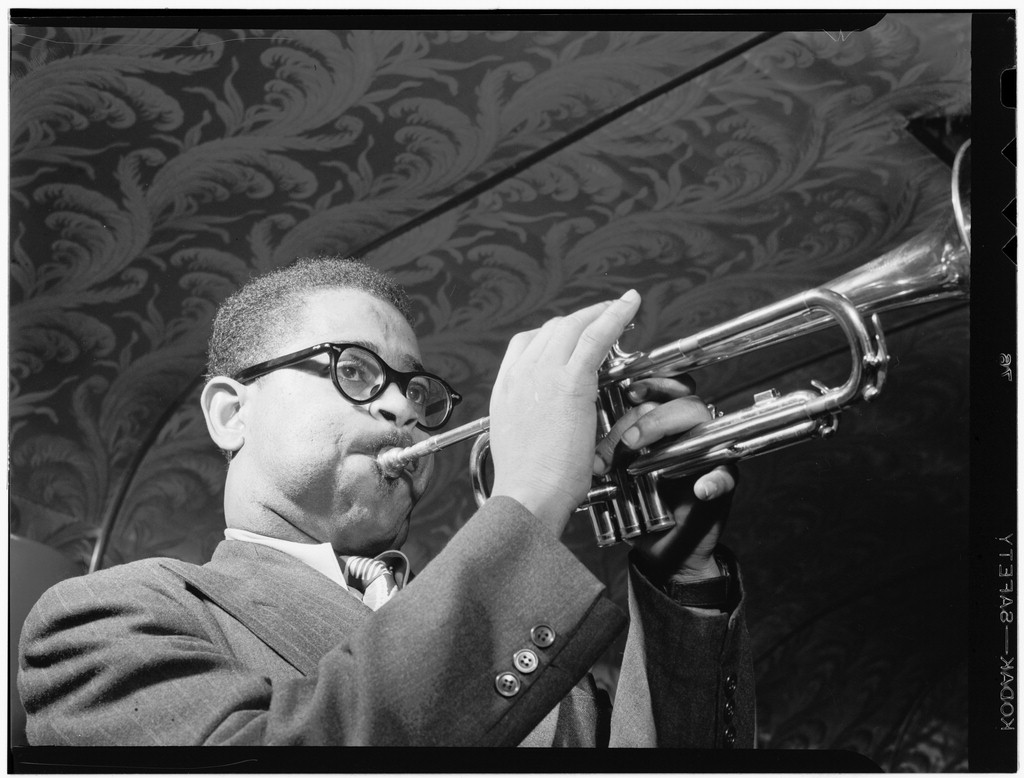
Dizzy Gillespie, playing the trumpet at the Savoy, 1947

The ballroom had a double bandstand that held one large and one medium-sized band running against its east wall. Music was continuous as the alternative band was always in position and ready to pick up the beat when the previous one had completed its set. The bouncers, who had previously worked as boxers, basketball players, and the like, wore tuxedos and made $100 a night. The floor was watched inconspicuously by a security force of four men at a time who were headed by Jack La Rue, and no man was allowed in who wasn't dressed in a jacket with a tie. Besides the security staff, the Savoy was populated by "Harlem's most beautiful women": the Savoy Hostesses. They would be fired for consorting with patrons outside the ballroom, but inside the hostesses would teach people to dance and were dance partners for anyone who purchased a 25 cent dance ticket. Roseland Ballroom hostesses often visited the Savoy on their night off; this inspired Buchanan to create Monday Ladies-Free Nights. Other special events began during the week, including the giveaway of a new car every Saturday. The floor had to be replaced every three years due to frequent use.

During the 1930s, Chick Webb was the bandleader of the Savoy's most popular house band. Ella Fitzgerald, fresh from a talent show victory at the Apollo Theater in 1934, became its teenage vocalist. Webb also recorded the 1934 big band song and jazz standard "Stompin' at the Savoy", which is named for the Savoy. The Savoy was the site of many Battle of the Bands or Cutting Contests, which started when the Benny Goodman Orchestra challenged Webb in 1937. Webb and his band were declared the winners of that contest. In 1938, Webb was challenged by the Count Basie Band. While Webb was declared the winner again, there was a lack of consensus on who won. Earle Warren, alto saxophonist for Basie, reported that they had worked on the song "Swingin' the Blues" for competing and says, "When we unloaded our cannons, that was the end".

Floating World Pictures made a documentary called The Savoy King about the ballroom. It was shown at the 50th New York Film Festival. Other prominent Savoy house bandleaders included Al Cooper, Erskine Hawkins, Lucky Millinder (with Wynonie Harris on vocals), Buddy Johnson, and Cootie Williams.

The Savoy participated in the 1939 New York World's Fair, presenting "The Evolution of Negro Dance".

The ballroom was shut down in April 1943 as a result of "charges of vice filed by the police department and Army". Its license was renewed in mid-October of the same year.

== Demolition and legacy ==
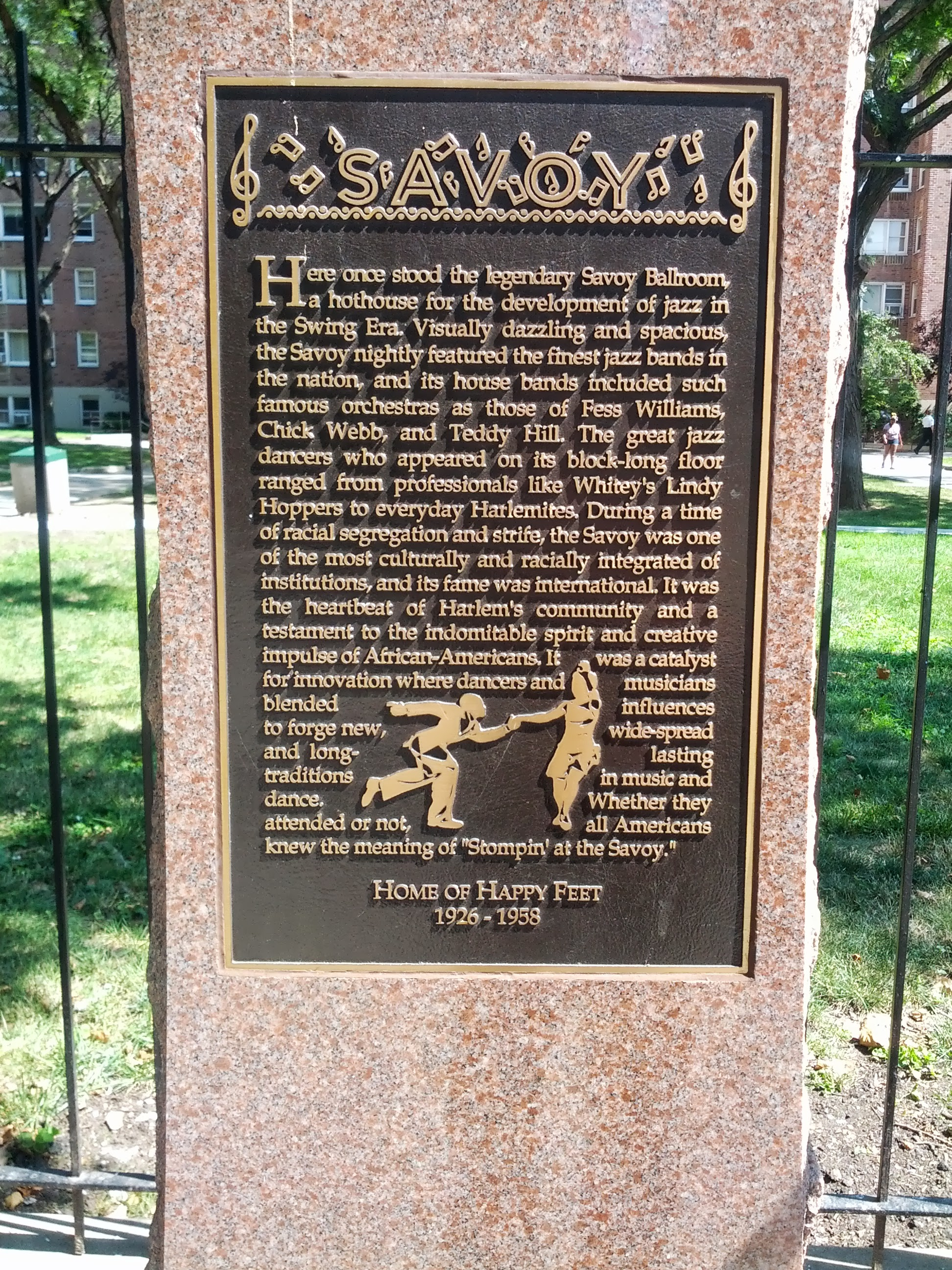
Plaque commemorating the Savoy Ballroom in Harlem, New York City

The ballroom went out of business in October 1958. Despite efforts to save it by Borough President Hulan Jack, Savoy Ballroom manager and co-owner Charles Buchanan, clubs, and organizations, the Savoy Ballroom was demolished for the construction of the Delano Village housing complex between March and April 1959. The mayor was the target of protest by clubs and organizations. The fixtures of the ballroom were auctioned for a "slum clearance housing project". Count Basie was quoted in the paper saying, "With the passing of the Savoy Ballroom, a part of show business is gone. I feel about the same way I did when someone told me the news that Bill (Bojangles) Robinson was dead".

On May 26, 2002, Frankie Manning and Norma Miller, members of Whitey's Lindy Hoppers, unveiled a commemorative plaque for the Savoy Ballroom on Lenox Avenue between 140th and 141st Streets.

On the 19th anniversary of the plaque's installation, the Savoy Ballroom was honored with an interactive Google Doodle rhythm game, which featured popular swing dance tunes like Ella Fitzgerald and Louis Armstrong's "Let's Call the Whole Thing Off" duet.

== See also ==
- List of jazz clubs
