= Roger Pryor Dodge =

American ballet, vaudeville, and jazz dancer

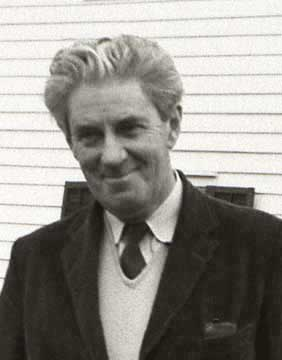
- Born: January 21, 1898; Paris, France
- Died: June 2, 1974 (aged 76); New York City
- Occupations: dancer, choreographer, writer
- Known for: jazz criticism, Nijinsky photographic collection
- Spouses: Anne Bacon (m. 1927; div. 1941) Joze Duval (m. 1944; ann. 1945) Lyena Barjansky (m. 1945)
- Children: Pryor

Roger Pryor Dodge (21 January 1898 — 2 June 1974) was an American ballet, vaudeville, and jazz dancer, as well as a choreographer and pioneering jazz critic. He formed the first extensive collection of photographic portraits of Vaslav Nijinsky.

Self-taught, his original thinking contributed to the understanding of the relationship of jazz to classical music and to dance. He endeavored to break down barriers between jazz and other 'serious' art forms and build the respect it deserved.

Dodge’s taste in jazz was formed in 1924, initially from listening to recordings of Fletcher Henderson and others, then refined when Miguel Covarrubias, newly arrived from Mexico and already ensconced in the Harlem Renaissance, introduced Dodge to recordings of Bessie Smith.

Jazz inspired Dodge to crystalize a unique style of white American dance, whereupon he choreographed dances to Duke Ellington's recordings with James "Bubber" Miley among others. For years, he performed these pieces in multiple locations in New York, brought a dance trio to perform in Paris, and filmed several of these numbers years later, c1937. His performance career ended in 1942 due to a back injury.

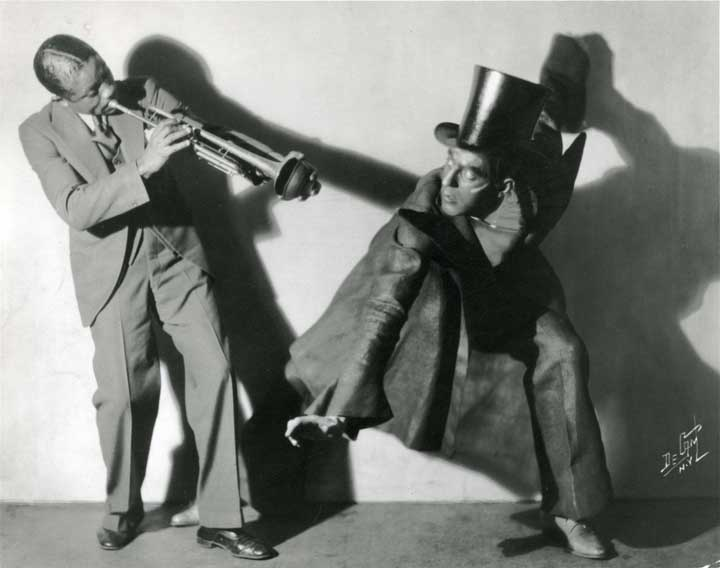
James "Bubber" Miley and Roger Pryor Dodge, c1930

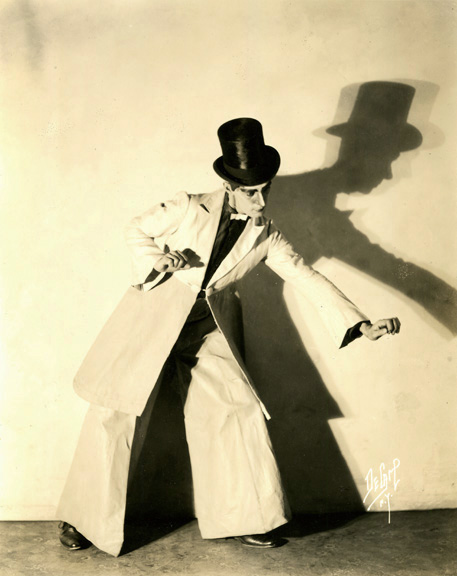
"The Man in the White Costume," c1934

== Early life ==
Dodge was born in Paris during one of the family’s extended sojourns. His father, American muralist William de Leftwich Dodge, a first place laureate of the Ecole des Beaux Arts, would visit to paint and exhibit at the Salon, often residing in Giverny. Upon their return, Dodge spent his childhood in Setauket, near Stony Brook on Long Island. He attended the Phillips Brooks School in Philadelphia, followed by The Pennington School in New Jersey, but quit before graduating. Later the family moved to Greenwich Village.

== Dance ==
=== Education ===
In 1916, Dodge’s Ritz-Carlton ballroom social dance partner introduced him to ballet—Les Ballets Russes starring Vaslav Nijinsky. This pivotal experience inspired Dodge to study classical ballet, attend performances of and study with Fokine and Fokina in 1919-1920, experience the Isadora Duncan Dancers (“Isadorables”), and shortly thereafter, to leave for Paris to continue his ballet studies with Nikolai Legat, one of Nijinsky's teachers, Lyubov Yegorova, who had partnered with Nijinsky, and Léo Staats, the maître de ballet at the Paris Opera.

Upon his return to New York in 1921, Dodge continued studying with Michel Fokine (1922). His desire to explore dance expression beyond ballet inspired him in 1922 to study eurhythmics at the Dalcroze School, Isadora Duncan technique with Elise Dufour, and modern dance with Michio Itō.

=== Nijinsky photographs ===
Nijinsky’s career ended in 1917. As he had never been filmed, Dodge realized that the only available means to experience Nijinsky’s greatness would be through photography. While in Paris taking ballet lessons and with the foresight to preserve a photographic record, Dodge proceeded to order prints from the photographers who had taken studio portraits of Nijinsky in his various roles. At times skipping meals to afford them, he assembled the most comprehensive collection of photographic images of Vaslav Nijinsky. By 1937 memory of Nijinsky had faded, prompting Dodge to help revive interest by donating his collection to the Dance Collection of the New York Public Library.

Practically every book on Nijinsky has borrowed from the Dodge collection, beginning in 1934 with Nijinsky by his wife Romola. After Dodge's numerous failed attempts to publish a book of his entire collection, in 1975 Lincoln Kirstein produced Nijinsky Dancing, drawing from half of Dodge’s collection.

Under Acknowledgements, Lincoln Kirstein writes:

The first American dancer I knew well was Roger Pryor Dodge[…he] taught me more about alternative forms of movement than I would ever gain from book or picture[…his] close observation of Fokine’s early ballets and Nijinsky’s performance and choreography kindled my own attempts to study theatrical movement.

Kirstein comments on viewing Dodge's performance to Ellington's "Black and Tan Fantasy" in 1935:

Mr. Dodge knows jazz dancing the way some Russians know ballet. He has codified it from years of research. He explodes into its action with violent and sustained excitement.

=== Dance partners (selection) ===
Dodge created his earliest choreography in 1922 for all-male ensembles.

In 1930, Dodge formed a male trio with Jack Nile, and Arthur Mahoney who he had met during their engagements at the Metropolitan Opera House.

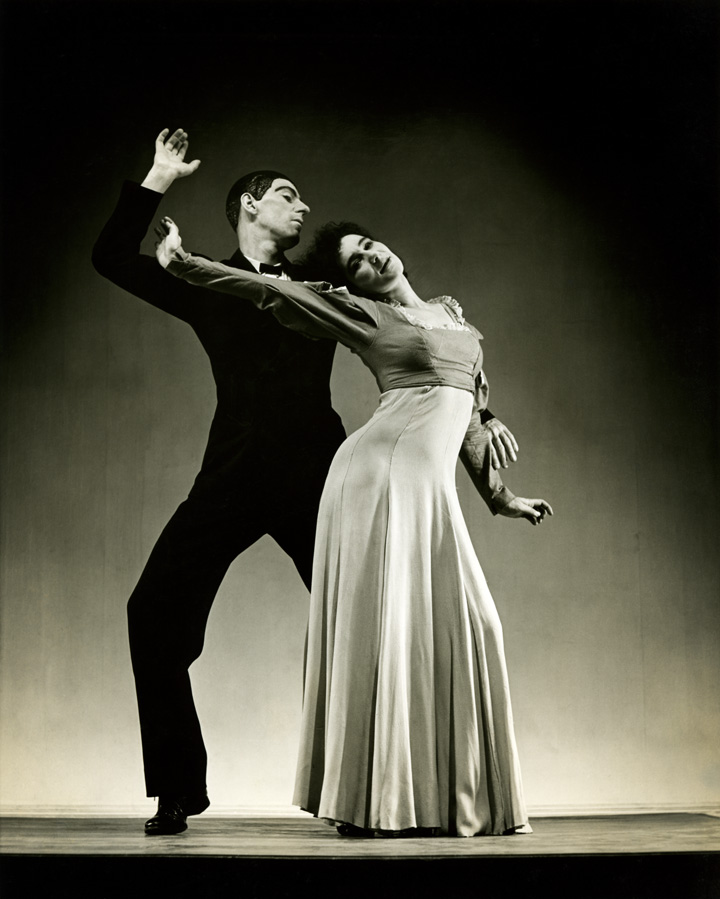
Roger Pryor Dodge and Mura Dehn, 1937

The same year, Dodge met Mura Dehn, a recent Russian émigré, when they each presented their jazz dance numbers in the Billy Rose Show “Sweet and Low.” As Dehn states, their pieces were “A daring jump into the Modern-Grotesque for the producer: a first such experiment in a commercial musical.”

They formed a professional dance relationship and appeared in each other’s choreography. Dodge filmed their dances c1937. They frequented the Harlem and Savoy Ballrooms, “and always had tumultuous discussions about art, dance, theatre, comedy. He rarely accepted other people’s understanding of his theories, even if they repeated them ‘verbatim’. He suspected it to be a superficial echo, rather than an inner experience.” Dodge was instrumental in Dehn’s appreciation of the importance of film for dance.

=== Dance performances (selection) ===
1921	Dodge entered the Metropolitan Opera corps de ballet. In parallel, his interest in corporal expression outside of ballet led to performances in vaudeville and burlesque venues
1922	Metropolitan Opera corps de ballet Earl Carroll Theatre: Michio Itō's “Pin Wheel Revue” included Dodge’s burlesque skit, “Lilies of the Field,” for six male dancers
1923	Metropolitan Opera corps de ballet Century Roof Theatre: The Illustrator’s Show, “Fly Swatter’s Ballet” for eight amateur male dancers Shubert Theatre: "Artists and Models—A Novelty Revue"
1924	Metropolitan Opera corps de ballet Allentown Lyric Theatre: Dodge performs with the Marx Brothers in “I'll Say She Is”
1925	Metropolitan Opera corps de ballet Teatro Colón, Buenos Aires: Dodge joined Adolph Bolm’s South American tour to perform in “Petrushka” and “Le Coq D’Or” Casino de Buenos Aires: “Los Excentricos,” solo vaudeville act
1926	Metropolitan Opera corps de ballet Metropolitan Opera: Dodge created the role of “White Wings” in John Alden Carpenter’s "Skyscrapers," the first jazz ballet
1927	Metropolitan Opera corps de ballet Jolson Theatre: Adolph Bolm Ballet Co. with Ruth Page, “The Tragedy of the Cello” “Lilies of the Field” on tour
1928	“Lilies of the Field” tour
1929	Paramount Theater (Gaumont-Opéra cinema), Paris: “Lilies of the Field” presented as “Roger Dodge et Ses Cinq Vagabonds,” including Arthur Mahoney, to "Marche slave" by Tchaikovsky
1930	Shubert Theatre: Billy Rose’s “Corned Beef and Roses” and “Sweet and Low” in a trio, accompanied on trumpet by Clarence Powell, later Jimmy McPartland; Chanin's 46th Street Theatre: trio with Arthur Mahoney and Jack Nile, with "Bubber" Miley solo cornet accompaniment playing Duke Ellington’s "East St. Louis Toodle-Oo"; Dodge’s admiration of Miley, Ellington’s lead trumpet, inspired Dodge to choreograph several jazz dances to his recordings
1931	Miley accompanies Dodge for four months in “Sweet and Low” Roxy Theater: multiple appearances with jazz dance trio with Arthur Mahoney and Jack Nile in "East St. Louis Toodle-Oo," "Black & White Review," and "Manhattan Serenade"; Gluck Sandor Studio: Mura Dehn dance concert with Dodge, Arthur Mahoney, accompanied by “Bubber” Miley; Alps Castle: Duo with Maria Gambarelli "Gamby"
1932	Roxy Theater: Jazz Duo with Jack Nile to King Oliver's “Call of the Freaks” Roxy Theater: Jazz trio "Manhattan Serenade" with Arthur Mahoney and Jack Nile; Waldorf Astoria: American Creators Fashion Show: Jazz Duo with Irene McBride in “‘Zulu King’ Dance” (“King of the Zulus” by Armstrong)
1933	Radio City Music Hall: “Artists’ Life” – Jazz Duo with Irene McBride in “King of the Zulus” Cruise Tour: Jazz Duo with Irene McBride on The National Tours Cruise’s “The Berlin Follies” to Havana, in “Black and White Blues” and “King of the Zulus”
1934	Bouché’s Villa Venice (Chicago): Jazz Duo with Barbara Williams, in “King of the Zulus,” “Black and White Blues,” “St. Louis Blues” (Handy), and “That Naughty Man”
1935	The New School for Social Research: “First Modern Dance Recital,” solo in “Black and Tan Fantasy”(Miley-Ellington); The New School for Social Research: “Second Modern Dance Recital,” solo in “Black and Tan Fantasy” Park Theater (Columbus Circle): “Men In The Dance,” a program against war, fascism, and censorship, “St. Louis Blues” and “Decadence,” music by Baldassare Galuppi; Waldorf Astoria: American Creators Fashion Show: Jazz Duo with Irene McBride in “‘Zulu King’ Dance”
1936	Juilliard School of Music: “Joseph And His Brethren,” a ballet-pantomime by Werner Josten with choreography by Arthur Mahoney; Majestic Theatre: "Men in the Dance"; 92nd Street Y: “First National Dance Congress Festival,” solo in “Boogie-Woogie,” (music by Cleo Brown), and with group in “The Man in the White Costume” Ritz Theatre: Federal Theatre Project (W.P.A.): “The Eternal Prodigal,” choreography by Gluck Sandor
1937	Federal Theatre Project: “Dance Program for Young Folk” – “The Little Mermaid,” based on a fairy tale by Hans Christian Andersen, choreography by Dodge, music excerpts from Felix Mendelssohn’s “Scotch” and “Italian” Symphonies; Bayes Theatre: Edwin Strawbridge ballet company with Lisa Parnova, Pinocchio, Dodge in the role of Gepetto; The Brooklyn Museum Dance Center: “The Young Choreographers’ Dance Laboratory,” a Federal Theatre Project – 4 performances with Mura Dehn, January – May; The New School for Social Research: Modern Dance Recital, "Jazz Toccata" and "Dance Composition I & II"
1938	92nd Street Y: “Dance Recital of Concert Jazz” with Mura Dehn – solo in “Dance Composition No. 2,” “Black and Tan Fantasy” and “Jazz Toccata”; with Dehn in “Man in the White Costume,” “St. Louis Blues,” with Susanne Remos in “Black and White Blues”; “The Lion Act” for six dancers, choreographed by Dodge
1940	Master Institute Theatre: “The Young Dancer” – with Susanne Remos “Black and White” and “Boogie Woogie Strut”

=== Films (selection) ===
Dodge opened a studio at 52 E. 8th Street mid-1930s where he filmed dancers: "See Yourself As Others See You...Have Your Act or Dance Filmed"

Dodge filmed a number of his dances with Mura Dehn and other partners. Video transfers are available in the Dance Division of the New York Public Library. (see also External links)

Roger Pryor Dodge Archive: films of Léo Staats, Nikolai Legat, Léonide Massine, Maria-Theresa Kruger (Duncan), Elise Dufour, Arthur Mahoney, Jack Nile, Alfred Leagins, Anita Avila, Susan Remos, Joe Frisco, Bill Matons and others

A Day in the Life of a Ballerina, about Lisa Parnova by Dodge, 1937

Bunk Johnson, Mrs. Johnson, and William Russell in Washington Square Park, New York, 1946 (silent film)

In a Jazz Way: Portrait of Mura Dehn, by Louise Ghertler and Pamela Katz, 1987, includes Dodge's color film with Dehn dancing to Ellington's "The Mooche" (1937)

=== Teaching ===
==== Modern jazz dance ====
- Chester Hale School, New York 1935
- De Revuelta Dance Studio, New York 1941
- Fred Le Quorne Studio, New York 1942

==== Tap dance ====
Private studio, 52 East 8th Street, New York

== Writing ==
=== Jazz ===
Enthusiastic reception of "Rhapsody in Blue" in 1924 prompted Dodge to attend its second New York performance at Carnegie Hall. In his first article, “Negro Jazz,” a response to reviews at the time, Dodge argued that "the word 'jazz' is being used too loosely and too indiscriminately by persons who have little perception of the true nature of the embryonic form now developing amongst us," and that “Gershwin selected that stalest of decadent forms the rhapsody; an episodic form that allows the furthest possible departure from the logical carrying to completion to a single musical idea, and hence, probably the form more remote from the genuine jazz ideal than any other.”

In response to the great importance accorded written jazz, either composed or arranged, in 1934 Dodge offered an appreciation of the improvised solo in "Harpsichords and Jazz Trumpets." He maintained that “improvisation is absolutely imperative to the development of an art form such as music and dancing,” and referring to contemporary evidence from 1639 for support, he quoted André Maugars’ experience in Rome:

André Maugars:

But above all the great Frescobaldi exhibited thousands of inventions on his harpsichord[…]for although his published compositions are witnesses to his genius, yet to judge of his profound learning, you must hear him improvise.

To illustrate the potential for the future of jazz, Dodge asserted that “jazz has reached the highest development of any folk music since the early Christian hymns and dances grew into the most developed contrapuntal music known to history.” Considering current taste, he added, “When I hear an early record of Bessie Smith and then listen to a Cab Calloway and see how much more the Negro now enjoys the latter, I realize that the blues have been superseded and white decadence has once more ironed out and sweetened a vital art.”

=== Classical music ===
In response to the vital swing Dodge felt missing in interpretations of Baroque music during its early-to-mid 20th century revival, and in an effort to identify a reliable common style element applicable to various period genres, in 1955 he published “The Importance of Dance Style in the Presentation of Early Western Instrumental Music.” (view article at External links)

=== Articles on jazz (selection) ===
1929 Negro Jazz. London:The Dancing Times (October) (written in 1925, titled Jazz Contra Whiteman)

1934 Harpsichords and Jazz Trumpets. Harvard:Hound & Horn (July–September)

1936 Negro Jazz as Folk Material for Our Modern Dance. New York:National Dance Congress (May)(proceedings: Cambridge University Press)

1939 Consider the Critics (chapter). Jazzmen, ed. Frederic Ramsey, Jr., Charles Edward Smith, New York:Harcourt Brace and Co. "Perhaps the most interesting part of all is the last chapter, in which Roger Pryor Dodge dissects the past sins of a number of jazz critics, and succeeds in establishing, if not a set of standards, at least a good critical attitude."

1941 Bubber. New York: H.R.S. Society Rag (October) "...one of the greatest artists of our time. He was a musician packed with half-formed ideas for written composition."

1942 Jazz in the Twenties. New York:JAZZ (July)

1943 Duke Ellington. New York:JAZZ (January)

- Correspondence on Lu Watters. New York:JAZZ (May)
- Louis Armstrong. New York:JAZZ (December)

1944 Jazz Critic Looks at Anthropologist (Ernest Borneman). New York:The Record Changer (October)

1945 The Dance-Basis of Jazz. New York:The Record Changer (March & April)

- Categorical Terms in Jazz: Improvisation versus Arranged Jazz. New York:The Record Changer (June) "Armstrong sells very good. Maybe he went a little commercial in order to do so. But what do we mean by 'going commercial'? It is very possible that the change in Armstrong's playing made him sell well, or will it be said that in order to sell well he changed, then it is 'going commercial,' but if one changes with none but a musical motive and because of it sells well, I cannot see that we are justified in calling that person commercial."

1946 The Psychology of the Hot Solo. London:Jazz Forum I (May or June)

- Attitude Towards Early and Late Jazz. New York:The Record Changer (February) (An earlier and shorter version of this; article appeared in The Atlantic Monthly, July 1944)
- The Deceptive Nature of Sensuousness in Ensemble Playing – London:The PL Yearbook of Jazz, edited by Albert McCarthy

1949 France's Answer to Bebop. New Orleans:Playback (June)

1955 Jazz: Its Rise and Decline. New York:The Record Changer (March)

- A Listener's Hierarchy in Jazz: Historical Precedents for the Future. New York:The Record Changer (September)

1958 Bubber Miley. New York:Jazz Monthly (May) "Everything about the 'twenties' is interesting, including Bubber's wa-wa. The period demonstrates what happens when an indigenous music is transplanted into artistically sterile ground and is commercially trimmed to popular taste. Bubber was one of the products of this period, a victim of it, but still a great man."

1959 Throwback. New York:The Jazz Review (May) (an appreciation of Elvis Presley)

=== Articles on dance, classical music, Cuban Sexteto, theater (selection) ===
1930 Serge Lifar: A Study. London:The Dancing Times (May) "He brought something new to the company [Diaghileff], a something I would call fine emotional expression through movement—not to be confused with pantomime. Strictly speaking, Lifar is not a ballet dancer. He uses ballet, but does not do it."

1938 On Nijinsky Photographs. New York:The American Dancer (March)

- Dance in the Cinema. New York:Dance Herald (April)

1943 Wanda Landowska. New York:JAZZ (March) "I say go and hear Wanda Landowska...who has a style of execution similar, no doubt, to the great harpsichordists of that other era—the harpsichordists whose rhythm at that time must have been as vital as the barrel-house and boogie-woogie piano of today."

1944 Dancing on Skates: Correspondence (Edwin Denby on Sonja Henie). New York Herald Tribune (February)

1946 A Non-Aesthetic Basis for the Dance. London:Jazz Forum II (September) (and Berkeley:Circle)"It is the dancers who can do difficult steps with the ease with which a child can skip, who not only receive but give the greatest pleasure."

1947 The Place of Space and Time in the Dance. London:Jazz Forum (January)

- Alicia Markova and Alicia Alonso. The Ballet (March)

1950 Nijinsky: An Appreciation. New York:Dance Magazine (August)

1954 Landmark: Landowska Completes the "48" (Preludes & Fugues). Great Barrington:High Fidelity (November)

1955 The Importance of Dance Style in the Presentation of Early Western Instrumental Music. Cambridge:The Music Review (November)

1958 The Cuban Sexteto. New York:The Jazz Review (December). "the singing [is] something extraordinary in itself and [contains] the most glorious music...The most infectious part of Cuban music is the montuno." This article is informed by four trips to Cuba, 1938-1951, and Dodge's over 200 sexteto recordings.

1959 & 1960 Jazz Dance, Mambo Dance. New York:The Jazz Review (November 1959, January 1960) “I find folk expression alone far more significant than any individual expression that fails to take advantage of folk material. Folk expression seems to be the result of a built-in mechanism, like a bird’s nest-building instinct, which provides a powerful and unselfconscious driving force for the creation of strong and healthy art forms.”

1963 Letters Pro and Con. The Journal of Aesthetics and Art Criticism (Winter, 1963) In response to articles by George Beiswanger and Selma Jeanne Cohen: "I do say that the creativeness in the dance comes from the dancer and not the choreographer...[and] no group presentation, even with all the power it derives from a multitude of bodies in motion, can project the aesthetic impact of a great solo dancer."

1964 Tradition in Ballet: Les Sylphides. London:The Dancing Times (January)

1966 The Image and the Actor. English Miscellany: A Symposium of Literature, History and the Arts, Edited by Mario Praz, Vol. 17. Rome: Edizioni di Storia e Letteratura (for the British Council). 175-209

1973 Shakespeare in Proper Dress. English Miscellany: A Symposium of Literature, History and the Arts, Edited by Mario Praz, Vol. 23. Rome: Edizioni di Storia e Letteratura (for the British Council). 75-112 "Bodily restriction channels expression more significantly than does bland comfort, and prompts the actor to express himself esthetically, rather than emotionally...An actor who can feel at ease in Elizabethan clothes is psychologically prepared to give a convincing reading of Shakespeare's lines."

=== Unpublished articles (selection) ===
- Illuminations by Martha Graham: The Poverty of the Contemporary Dance and the Inadequacy of Choreography. "When she dances everything else is forgotten; the other dancers, choreography and all."
- The Concert Dance: A Fugitive to be Captured
- The Non-Esthetic Basis of Art
- The Possibility of Comparison Within and Between the Arts
- Towards a Science of Art
- The Comedian Theatre: The True Art of the Theatre
- Utility Basis of Architecture
- Architecture Criticism
- Byzantine Art: Its Origin

=== Unpublished criticism (selection) ===
- Art as Experience, John Dewey
- Aesthetic Judgement, D. W. Prall
- Critique of Aesthetic Judgement, Immanuel Kant, 1911
- A History of Aesthetic, Bernard Bosanquet, 1892

== Sound recordings ==
1931. Private recording of “Bubber” Miley. "...one of the greatest artists of our time...he held a unique position among the jazz musicians of the late twenties..." Dodge recorded Bubber's variations on “King of the Zulus” and “Black and Tan Fantasy,” accompanied on piano by Anne Dodge (Dodge’s first wife).

1954. Georgia Peach (born Clara Hudman), gospel singer. Dodge maintained that Georgia Peach’s singing was a truer expression of gospel than that of Mahalia Jackson. To promote her art, he produced the 12 inch LP: The Famous Georgia Peach: Gospel in the Great Tradition, Classic Editions, 16 tracks; Guitar/banjo: Danny Barker, piano: James Francis and John Ephraim. "Georgia Peach can claim the most subtle and ecstatic Negro religious voice of modern times."

== Attempts at revival ==
In 1960, Dodge’s son transcribed his father's favorite trumpet, clarinet and trombone solos for an ensemble that included clarinetist Joe Muranyi and trombonist Roswell Rudd. After rehearsals recorded on his Wollensak, Dodge would return disappointed, for the musicians tended to improvise in a contemporary rather than period style. Fundamental aspects of playing style were a concern Dodge also applied to early classical music performance.

== Last years ==
At the age of 75, thirty years after his last performance, Dodge intended to film himself in five Baroque solo court dances. His costume was based on a print of Faune in Le Triomphe de Bacchus, together with a home-made white papier mâché mask. Three dances were to be accompanied by excerpts from Gluck's Orfeo ed Euridice, Bach's Wedding Cantata and a Handel Organ Sonata. The other two were a sarabande by Rameau and a dance by C. P. E. Bach. He did not live to see the project completed.

He did perform these dances at home for Mura Dehn, and in addition, a new version of an early jazz dance composition. Dehn wrote that these pieces were a summation of his knowledge of and reflections on dance, performed with the style of an average middle-aged gentleman with artistry and taste. She could envision that George Washington would have danced in that manner. However his jazz piece was wild with abandon.

== See also ==
- The Spirit Moves by Mura Dehn
- Institute of Jazz Studies: Dodge's record collection of jazz and Cuban sexteto 78s was donated in 2007.

== Notes ==
- "Roger Dodge Dies; A Choreographer,” The New York Times (Obituary) (4 June 1974)
- Roger Pryor Dodge Archive, Jerome Robbins Dance Division of the New York Public Library at Lincoln Center. Contains photographs, performance programs and reviews, manuscripts, and 16mm films.
