= Arthur Mahoney =

American dancer

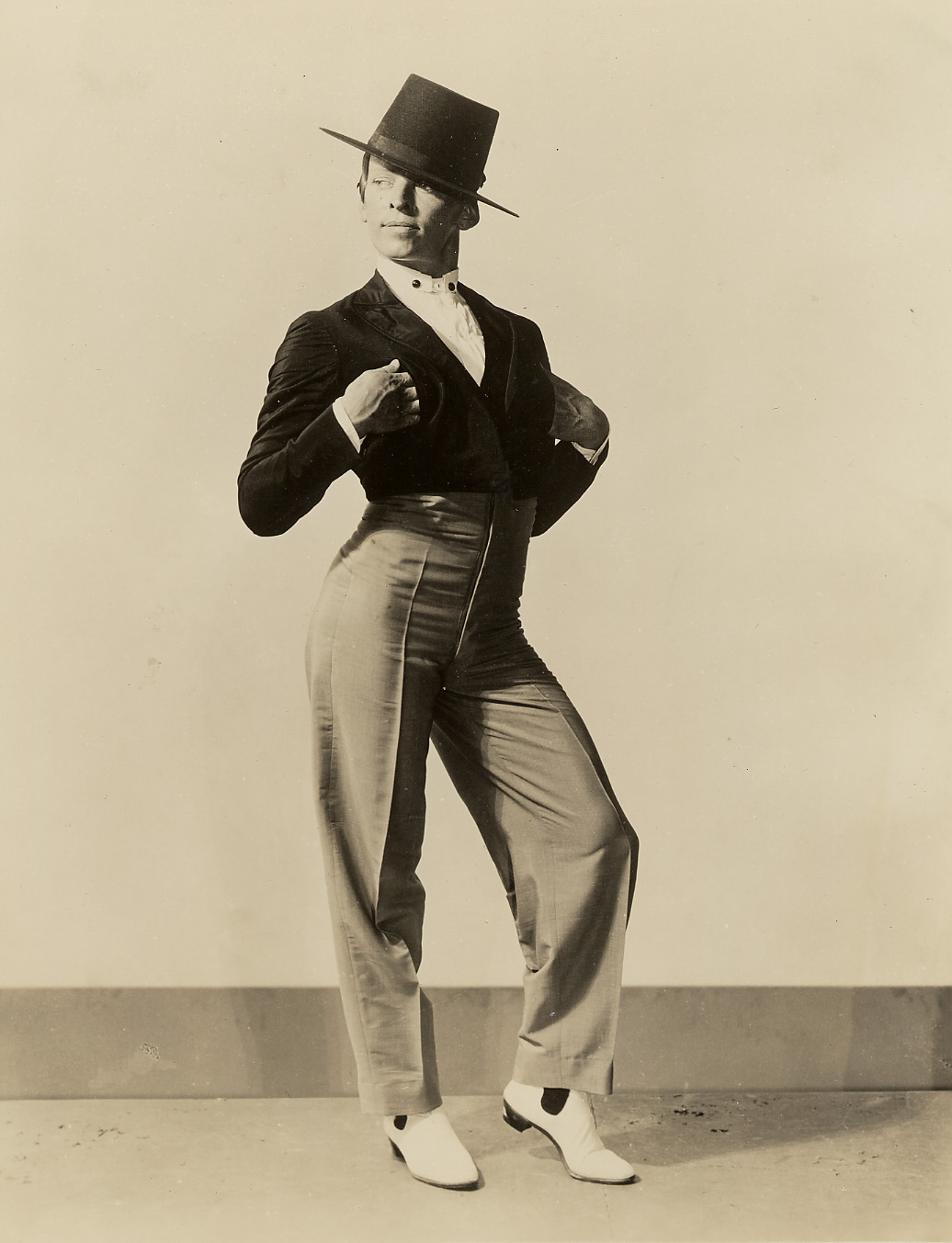
- Born: July 19, 1904; Boston, Massachusetts
- Died: August 3, 1985 (aged 81); Jackson, Mississippi
- Occupations: dancer, choreographer, educator
- Known for: choreography and performances at Jacob's Pillow
- Spouse: Thalia Mara (born Elizabeth Simons) (m. 1939)

Arthur Mahoney (19 July 1904 — 3 August 1985), born in Boston, was a ballet, modern, jazz, flamenco, and 18th century court dancer.

Mahoney was inspired to become a ballet dancer upon seeing a magazine cover photo of Vaslav Nijinsky in the role of "Le Spectre de la rose." He then moved to New York in 1923 to study ballet with Luigi Alberteri, ballet master at the Metropolitan Opera, where he received his first professional engagement that lasted three seasons. He made his debut as soloist in 1926, in “La Vestale” by Gaspare Spontini.

Paris 1928–29, Mahoney studied with Bronislava Nijinska and joined Ida Rubenstein's Ballet company. At this time he met his future wife Thalia Mara, who was studying ballet with Olga Preobrajenska and Nikolai Legat.

In 1935, Mahoney joined the faculty of the Juilliard School as its Dance Director and choreographer.

In 1944, Mahoney and Thalia Mara, founded and became artistic directors of the School of Dance Arts located in the Carnegie Hall Studios.

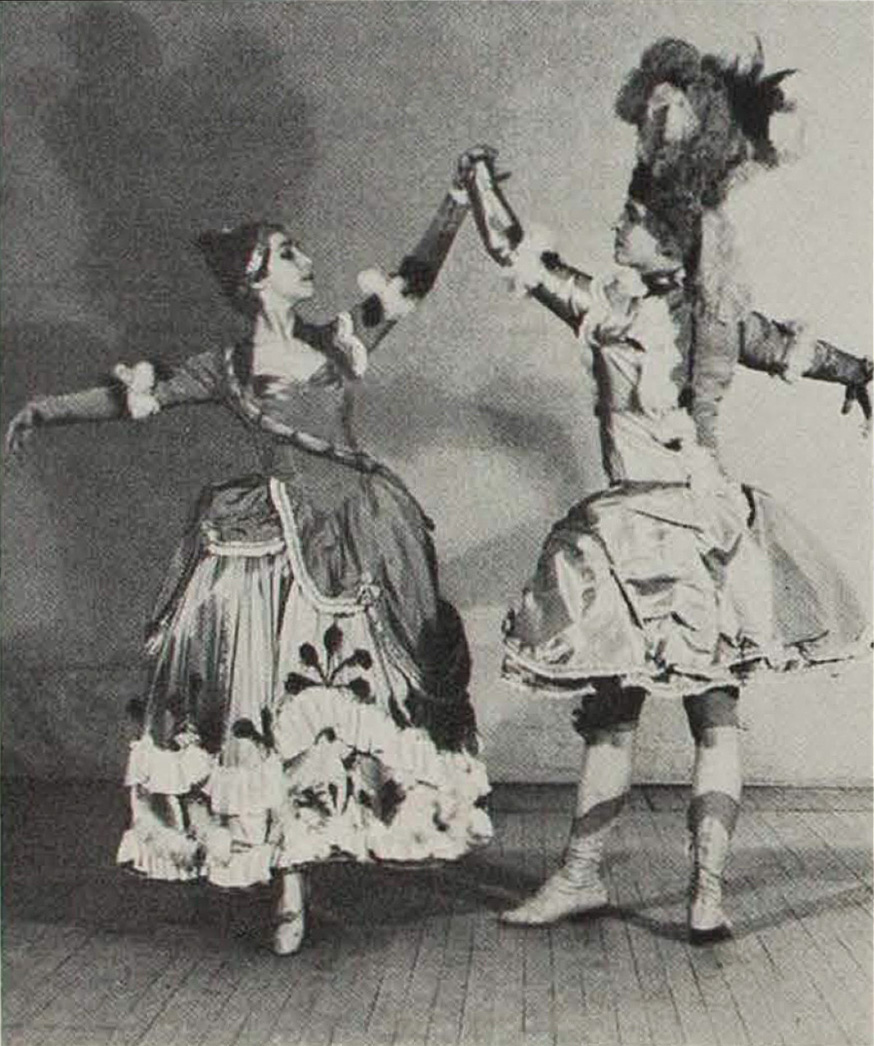
With Thalia Mara in "Court Dances," Brooklyn Academy of Music, 1941

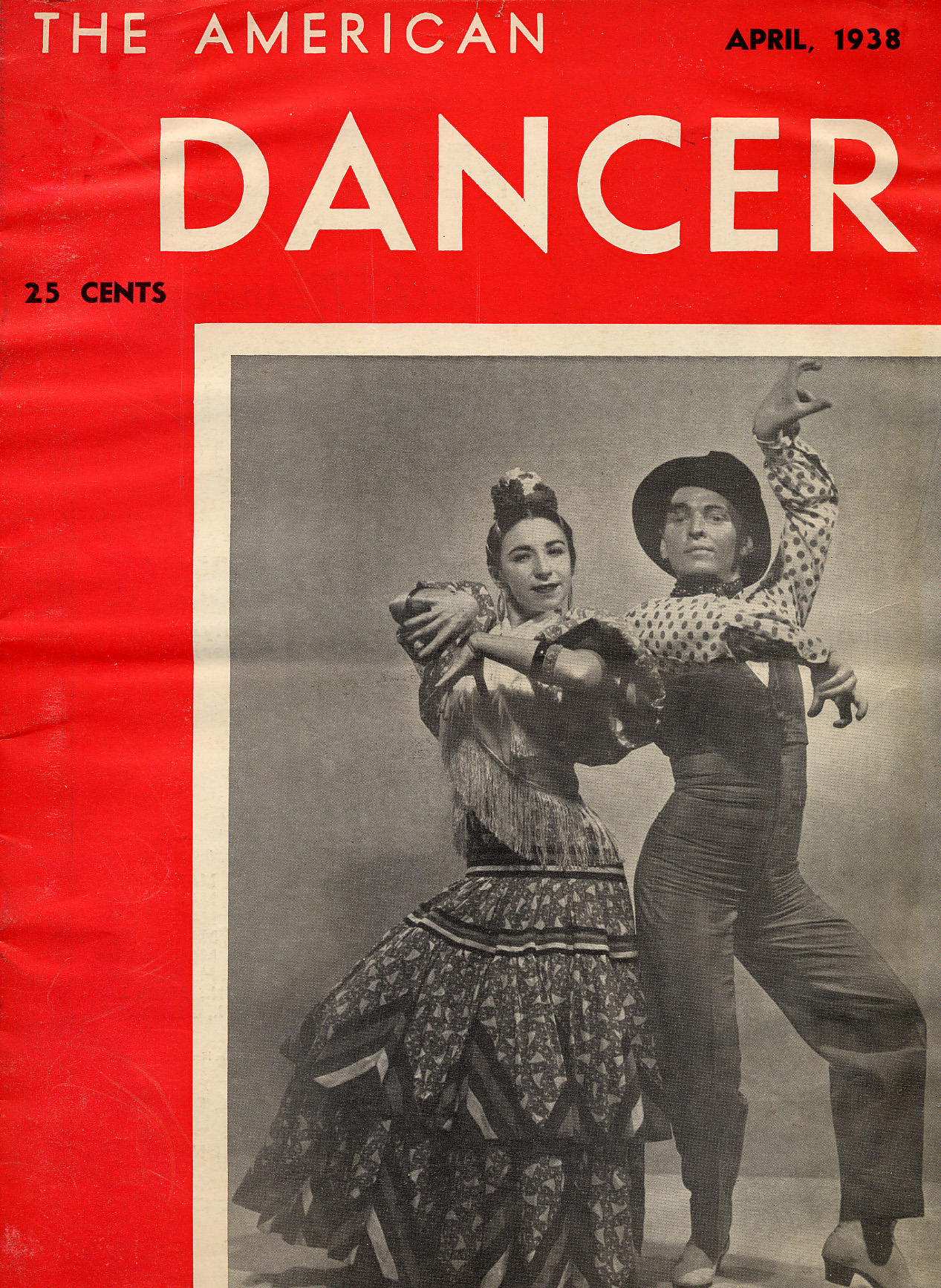
With Thalia Mara in "Flamenco," 1938

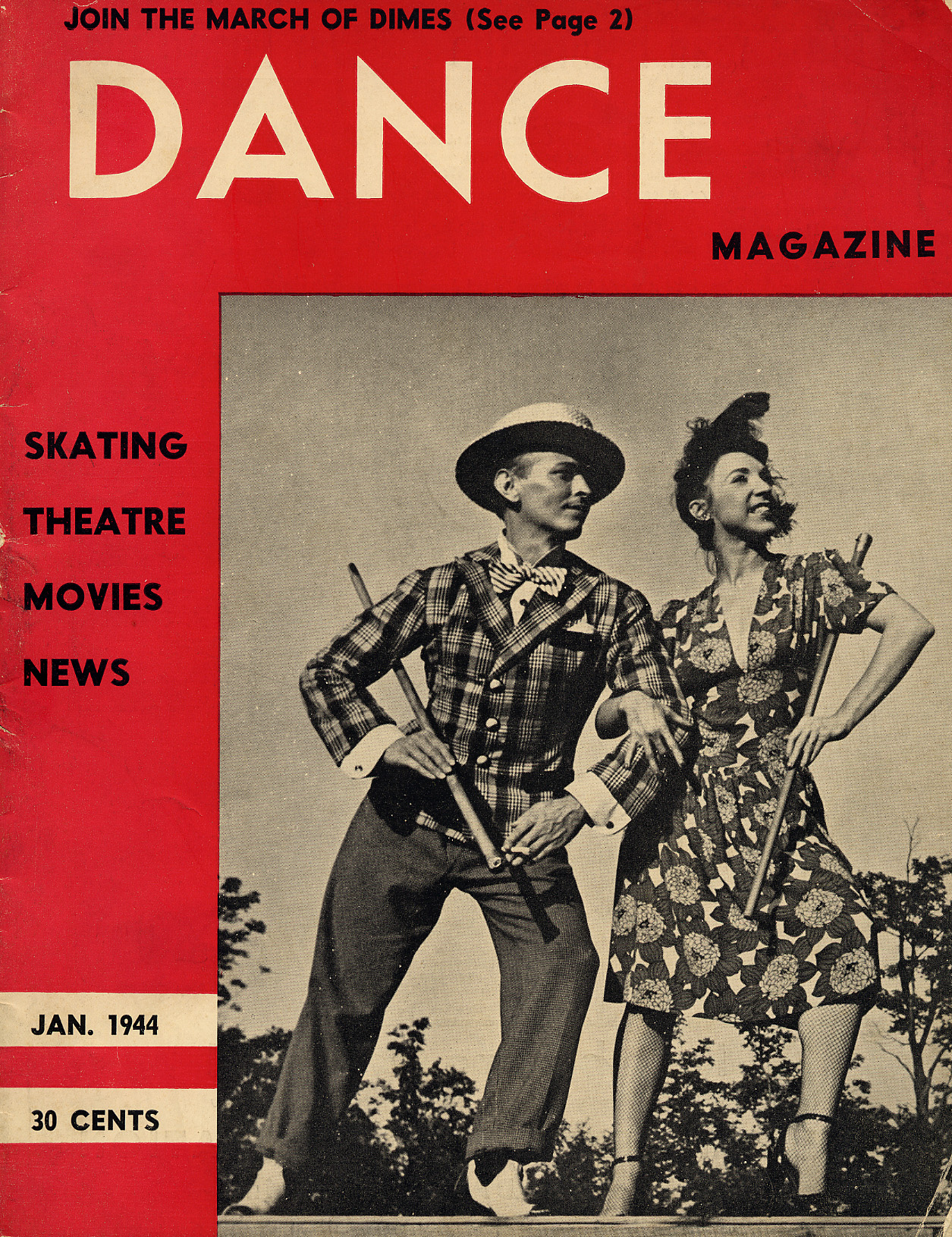
With Thalia Mara in "Jazz," Jacob's Pillow, 1947

In 1947, Mahoney and Thalia Mara became managing directors at Jacob’s Pillow during Ted Shawn's leave of absence. They created a resident dance company, “Ballet Repertory” with a group of approximately 18 dancers of equal status. Having lost their studio at Carnegie Hall that year, they moved it to 117 West 54th Street. Mahoney gave dance and movement coaching sessions to singers from the Metropolitan Opera, notably Lily Pons and Risë Stevens. Mahoney moved to California c1963.

In 1978, after 15 years of separation, Mahoney joined Mara in Jackson, Mississippi, where she was Director of "The Jackson Ballet." Mahoney became teacher and coach of the company's male dancers.

== Performances (selection) ==
1926	Metropolitan Opera: Debut dancing in “La Vestale” by Gaspare Spontini
1927	Philadelphia Academy of Music: repeat of “La Vestale” Jolson Theatre: Mahoney performed with the Adolph Bolm Co. in “The Rivals, A Chinese Legend”
1928	Opera de Paris: Mahoney performs in the premier of "Bolero" by Maurice Ravel
1929	Paramount Theater (Gaumont-Opéra cinema), Paris: Mahoney performed in Roger Pryor Dodge's burlesque skit “Lilies of the Field” presented as “Roger Dodge et Ses Cinq Vagabonds,” to "Marche slave" by Tchaikovsky; Teatro Colón (Buenos Aires): Mahoney and Thalia Mara perform with Opera Rusa, a touring company originated in Paris as Opéra Privé de Paris under Michel Fokine
1930-1	Chanin’s 46th Street Theatre: Mahoney performed in Roger Pryor Dodge’s Trio with Jack Nile, in Billy Rose’s review “Sweet and Low,” to Duke Ellington’s “East St. Louis Toodle-Oo,” accompanied by cornetist James "Bubber" Miley
1931	Gluck Sandor Studio: Mahoney performed in Mura Dehn’s dance concert with Dodge, accompanied by “Bubber” Miley; Roxy Theater: multiple appearances with Dodge Trio in "East St. Louis Toodle-Oo," "Black & White Review," and "Manhattan Serenade"
1932	Roxy Theatre: Dodge Trio in "Manhattan Serenade"; Radio City Music Hall: Inaugural program; "Hymn to the Sun," from "Le Coq d'Or" by Nikolai Rimsky-Korsakoff
1934	Lewisohn Stadium: Mahoney and Rita De Leporte perform in "Carmen" (Georges Bizet); The Juilliard School of Music: Mahoney performed in George Antheil’s opera "Helen Retires." This success led Juilliard to immediately hire Mahoney in 1935 as teacher and dance director
1936	Juillard: Mahoney was the choreographer and lead dancer in the ballet-pantomime, "Joseph and his Brethren" by Werner Josten; 92nd Street Y: First National Dance Congress Festival, “The outstanding item from the standpoint of audience approval was Mr. Mahoney’s excellently danced farruca in the manner of Escudero….Mr. Mahoney’s revivals of a sarabande and an allemande in the authentic style were also among the evenings’s best numbers” Lewisohn Stadium: Mahoney and Mara perform in "Carmen" (Bizet)
1937	Guild Theater: Program includes "Gaillarde Tambourin," "Roi Soleil," "Allemande," "Musette," "Sevillanas," Alegrias," "Farruca," and "Bulerias"
1939	Lewisohn Stadium: Mahoney and Mara perform in "Carmen" (Bizet)
1941	Brooklyn Academy of Music: “Court Dances” 18th century court dances to George Frideric Handel ("Alcina" Suite) and Luigi Boccherini with Thalia Mara. A "Serénade Espagnole" (pasodoble) by Bizet; Brooklyn Academy of Music: "Spanish Folk Fiesta," music by Isaac Albéniz, Manuel de Falla, with Thalia Mara. Mahoney dances a farruca, ensemble dances sevillanas
1942	Jacob's Pillow: “Eighteenth Century Court Dances” with Thalia Mara (Handel and Henry Purcell), solo dance of Apollo from "Le Roi Soleil" (Jean-Baptiste Lully). Closing with a duo, a 19th Century "Bolero"
1943	Jacob's Pillow: with Thalia Mara, dancing "Serenata Español" (Georges Bizet), "Blue Fantasy" (Ernesto Lecuona), "Jota Argonese" (de Falla); Jacob's Pillow: with Thalia Mara, "Bolero," "Cordoba" (Albéniz), "Blues in the Night" (Harold Arlen)
1944	Jacob's Pillow: "Iberian Rhythms" (solo), with Thalia Mara— "Echos of Harlem," "Jota Argonese" (de Falla); Jacob's Pillow: with Thalia Mara—"Gonna See My Gal" a Strut (Leigh Harline), "Cordoba" (Albénez), "Gigue-Diane Chasseresse" (Bach), "Rigaudon-Impromptu" (François Couperin), "La Valse Viennoise" (Johann Strauss); Jacob's Pillow: "Crosstown" ballet in one act, story and choreography by Mahoney, music by Tom Scott; story of boxer Slugger Joe, with Mahoney, Mara and company; "Bolero"; "La Valse Viennoise" (Strauss); Jacob's Pillow: "Blues in the Night" (Arlen), "Seville Comes to Harlem" (Lecuona)
1945	New York City Center: dance recital with Thalia Mara; Lewisohn Stadium: Mahoney and Mara perform in "Carmen" (Bizet), choreography by Mahoney
1947	Jacob's Pillow: "Crosstown" ballet in one act, story and choreography by Mahoney, music by Tom Scott; story of boxer Slugger Joe, with Mahoney, Mara and company; "Ballads from the Blue Ridge" (Tom Scott), staged by Mahoney, with Mahoney, Mara and company Jacob's Pillow: with Thalia Mara, "Serenade Espagnole" (Bizet), "Jota Aragonese" (de Falla), solo: "Iberian Rhythms"; Jacob's Pillow: "Parnassus" ballet in one act (Handel), choreography by Mahoney, Mahoney, Mara, and company Jacob's Pillow: "La Notche [sic] Clara" (Bright Night)—Ballet by Mahoney, music by Albéniz, with Mahoney, Mara, and company; "Parnassus." “1st season as directors of festival and school...Mahoney’s knowledge of the Spanish dance is extensive”
