= Tom Scott =

Tom Scott most commonly refers to:

- Tom Scott (saxophonist) (born 1948), American jazz musician
- Tom Scott (presenter) (born 1984 or 1985), English online personality and web developer

Tom Scott may also refer to:

== Arts and entertainment ==
- Tom Scott (composer) (1912–1961), American folk singer and classical composer
- Tom Scott (painter, born 1854) (1854–1927), Scottish water-colourist
- Tom Scott (painter, born 1928) (1928–2013), American abstract painter
- Tom Scott (poet) (1918–1995), Scottish poet
- Tom Scott (cartoonist) (born 1947), New Zealand cartoonist
- Tom Everett Scott (born 1970), American actor
- Tom Scott (sound engineer), shared the Academy Award for Best Sound in 1983 and 1984
- Tom Scott (rapper) (born 1984), New Zealand rapper

== Politics ==
- Tom Scott (Connecticut politician) (born 1958), member of the Connecticut Senate
- Tom Scott (West Virginia politician) (1932–2024), member of the West Virginia Senate

== Sports ==
- Tom Scott (American football coach) (1920–1978), coach of the Brooklyn Dodgers
- Tom Scott (basketball coach) (1908–1993), coach of the North Carolina Tar Heels basketball program
- Tom Scott (Canadian football) (born 1951), member of the Canadian Football Hall of Fame
- Tom Scott (footballer) (1904–1979), English footballer
- Tom Scott (linebacker) (1930–2015), member of the College Football Hall of Fame
- Tom Scott (offensive lineman) (born 1970), American football offensive lineman
- Tom Scott (rugby union, born 1870) (1870–1930), Scotland international rugby union player
- Tom Scott (rugby union, born 1875) (1875–1947), Scotland international rugby union player

== Others ==
- Tom Scott (businessman) (born 1966), founded Nantucket Nectars

== See also ==
- Thomas Scott (disambiguation)
- Tommy Scott (disambiguation)
- Tom Scutt (born 1983), British designer
