= Lynn Green Root =

American artist

- Born: March 18, 1954; Jackson, Mississippi, U.S.
- Died: March 6, 2001 (aged 46); Jackson, Mississippi, U.S.
- Education: University of Mississippi; University of New Orleans
- Occupations: Painter, illustrator
- Parent(s): Myra Hamilton Green and Joshua Green

Lynn Green Root (March 18, 1954 – March 6, 2001) was an American portrait painter, muralist, and illustrator from the state of Mississippi.

== Life ==
Root was born 18 March 1954, in Jackson, Mississippi. Her mother, Myra Hamilton Green, was a painter. She received a bachelor's degree from the University of Mississippi, then pursued a master of fine arts degree at the University of New Orleans. In addition to studying at universities, she studied under abstract expressionist Fred Mitchell.

Root was a portrait painter and a muralist, painting illustrations and narrative landscapes. Her signature style elements can be described as kinetic lines and bold, assertive colors. It's hard to classify her work into one category but if one was to you could say her work was neoexpressionistic, neoprimitive, or even magical realism. She did a portrait of Thalia Mara; it was installed in Thalia Mara Hall. Root was also an illustrator of books and CDs.

Root's first major exhibition was the 1975 Mississippi Arts Festival. Root's work was exhibited at the Contemporary Arts Center, the University of New Orleans, and the University of Alabama. With her mother, Root exhibited her paintings at the Municipal Art Gallery in Jackson, Mississippi in 1999. The exhibition was called Myra Green and Lynn Green Root: A Mother Daughter Exhibition.

Root died on March 6, 2001, in Jackson, Mississippi, at age 46.
