= Campbellsburg =

Campbellsburg can refer to a place in the United States:

- Campbellsburg, Indiana
- Campbellsburg, Kentucky
