= Kea Tawana =

American artist (c 1936–2016)

Kea Tawana (c. 1935 – August 4, 2016) was an American artist known for creating the Ark, an 86-foot-long, three-story high ship she built in Newark, New Jersey, starting in 1982. For decades she had collected salvaged wood, stained glass, and other materials from abandoned buildings in the city's Central Ward, which had been hollowed out by poverty and riots in the late 1960s. She built the Ark on an empty lot; it was still unfinished when the city condemned it in 1987. Unable to find a new location, Tawana dismantled her ship in 1988. Tawana's Ark is classified as an example of visionary art and vernacular architecture.

There are numerous questions about Tawana, her personal and gender identity, and her past. She told people in Newark that she was born in Japan, to a Japanese mother and an American father, who was a civil engineer, and came with him and her brother to the United States after World War II. She said her mother and sister had been killed in a bombing raid in Japan. But her obituary said that she was born on an Indian reservation and ran away at age 12. She worked for some years at a variety of itinerant jobs in the South before settling in Newark in the 1950s. There she worked for decades in a range of construction trades. After being forced to dismantle her Ark, she moved to Port Jervis, New York in western Orange County. She lived there for her remaining years.

== Early life ==
Kea Tawana told people that she was born circa 1935 in Japan, the second of three siblings. Her mother was Japanese and her father was an American civil engineer. Her mother and sister died during Allied bombing raids in World War II. Tawana and her brother moved with their American father to the United States in 1947. By her account, her father remarried but died in a displaced persons camp in California, leaving her and her brother homeless and orphaned by age 12.

Her obituary said that she was born on an Indian reservation and ran away from home at age 12. She worked her way South. Strong and sturdy, she had a fierce independence and usually wore men's clothes to protect her privacy.

== On the road ==
Tawana supported herself as an itinerant worker in a variety of jobs, including learning construction trades. She found acceptance primarily in the African-American community. In 1953, Tawana freighthopped to Newark, New Jersey, where she found work in construction and theater lighting. She also worked in a shipyard in Brooklyn, New York. She lived and worked in Newark for more than 30 years.

She moved to Port Jervis, New York in the late 1980s, after being forced to demolish her Ark. She was known in the small town, and died there at home on August 4, 2016.

== Ark ==
Tawana began construction of her Ark on August 8, 1982, using wood salvaged from abandoned buildings, connected with mortise and tenon joints. The ship's frame was 86 feet long, 20 feet wide, and 28 feet high. As she intended it to be both sculpture and a seaworthy vessel, she reinforced the Ark's bulkhead with iron and built five waterproof compartments. She intended to christen the Ark as the AKE Matsu Kaisha (Red Pine). Tawana was evicted in 1986, after the vacant lot she occupied was purchased by the New Community Corporation. She moved the Ark by herself to the parking lot of the Humanity Baptist Church, where she worked as a caretaker and guard.

Photographer Camilo José Vergara said that Tawana was "the only folk artist in the Eastern United States to have built a work comparable in scope and conception to the famous Watts Towers of Los Angeles." Didi Barrett of the Museum of American Folk Art described Tawana and the Ark as "compelling symbols of hope and human potential in a community that has suffered a troubled past." Lynda Hartigan, former chief curator of the Smithsonian American Art Museum, said that Tawana's work "genuinely original, uncommercialized, and straight from the heart and mind..."

Tawana generated controversy by her work, her androgynous or masculine appearance, and her opposition to urban development in the Central Ward. A spokesperson for Mayor Sharpe James expressed such discomfort with her identity, when she was prominently opposing the city's plans for development. But she gained support from the Folk Art Society of America, critics, and numerous other groups to preserve her work. Though no structural flaws were cited, the Newark Department of Engineering condemned the Ark as unsafe in 1987 and ordered its demolition. Tawana went to court, where her lawyer defended the Ark as a work of art and as free speech. After a temporary injunction, Tawana agreed to demolish the Ark, a process which she completed in the summer of 1988.

== Represented in other media ==
- David Wolfson composed Maya's Ark, a 10-minute opera inspired by Tawana's project. He stresses it is "heavily fictionalized", especially the character of Maya.

== See also ==
- Mark Bradford – shipped a similar installation to New Orleans in 2008 to commemorate Hurricane Katrina
- Tilted Arc – a controversial commissioned public art sculpture that was removed from its site after public opposition and a court challenge
- Clarence Schmidt
- Watts Towers
- Grandma Prisbrey's Bottle Village
