= Leonora Baroni =

Italian lutenist and composer

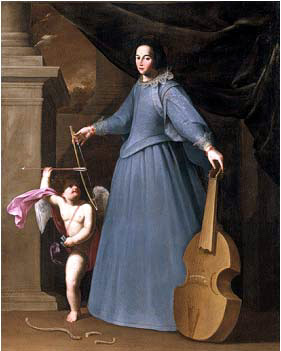
Portrait of Leonora Baroni by Fabio Della Cornia (1600–1643)

Leonora Baroni (December 1611 – 6 April 1670) was an Italian singer, theorbist, lutenist, viol player, and composer of the Baroque period.

== Biography ==
=== Life and career ===
Leonora Baroni was the daughter of Adriana Basile, a virtuosa singer, and Mutio Baroni. She was born at the Gonzaga court in Mantua. From 1624 to 1633. Baroni sang alongside her mother and sister Caterina at court and across Italy, including cities such as Naples, Genoa, and Florence. She was admired not only for her skill as a musician, in which she almost overshadowed her mother, but also for her learning and refined manners. She was even known to speak many different languages. Baroni was a gifted singer as well as a gifted instrumentalist on both the theorbo and viol. Baroni's mother performed on the lira, while her sister played the harp. In 1633, Baroni moved with her mother to Rome, where she sang at many salons in the Palazzo Barberini as a member of the Accademia degli Umoristi. She was considered a superior Italian chamber singer, and had success performing by herself as well as with her mother and sister.

After a series of poems were published about Baroni in 1639, her social position rose greatly. This fame sparked jealousy, leading to the vandalism of her family's home later that year. In response, the Baroni family and their allies released a collection of improvised verses titled L'idea della veglia. On 27 May 1640, Baroni married Giulio Cesare Castellani, Cardinal Francesco Barberini's personal secretary. In February 1644, Baroni moved to the French court of Anne of Austria briefly, but by April 1645 she was back in Rome, where she was a chamber singer. During her voyage back to Rome, Baroni stayed at the court of Christine of Savoy, with whom she maintained a relationship sending vocal music throughout the following decade. Apparently she was not admired in Paris, perhaps because her Italian style of ornamented singing was too foreign to the court there. However, the queen regent did grant her a large sum of money as well as jewels. If her health had allowed, Baroni might have returned to France at a later time.

After returning to Rome in 1645, Baroni continued her life as a salon host within noble society. She continued performing even after her husband's death in 1662. She would typically accompany herself on the lute or theorbo. Her artistic reputation remained strong, especially due to her close relationship with Pope Clement IX (Monsignor Giulio Rospigliosi). Baroni died in 1670 in Rome.

=== Legacy ===
Baroni is respected as a leading figure among female vocal soloists during the Baroque period. She was recognized as both a musician and composer while maintaining a prominent role within society. Baroni hosted prestigious social and political gatherings through her musical presence, leading her to become an glamorized noblewoman. This influence was especially seen during the papal election of Clement IX. Baroni soon became the subject of many tribute poems that highlighted her as a symbol of the ideal court lady.

Baroni was honored by poets such as Fulvio Testi and Francesco Bracciolini, who addressed poems to her, as did some nobles, such as Annibale Bentivoglio and then-cardinal Pope Clement IX. These poems were collected and published as Applausi poetici alle glorie della Signora Leonora Baroni in 1639 and reprinted in 1641. John Milton later wrote a series of epigrams to her, entitled Ad Leonoram Romae canentem (1639). Others praised Baroni for her challenging yet moving musical performances.

== Music ==
None of Baroni's compositions survive, but the French traveller and viol player André Maugars mentioned her compositions while praising the musical understanding of her singing. It is understood that Baroni was active in composition during the 17th century and composed strophic variations. She composed both music and verse, but there are no known compositions accredited to her. However, one of her sonnets appears in the Applausi poetici, and seven of her poems are included in L'idea della veglia.

It can be assumed that Baroni's repertoire consisted mostly of solo songs, cantatas, and arias where she accompanied herself. This included both sacred and secular works. She sang in the Italian style, and was skilled in the emerging 'Stile recitativo', which included text interpretation and more speak-like singing. Baroni was proficient in both enharmonic and chromatic techniques, demonstrating her training in contemporary and traditional musical styles.
