= Cedar Lawn Cemetery (disambiguation) =

Cedar Lawn Cemetery is the name of many cemeteries including:

- Cedar Lawn Cemetery (Jackson, Mississippi)
- Cedar Lawn Cemetery, Paterson, New Jersey
