= Thomas Scott =

Thomas Scott may refer to:

== Business and industry ==
- Thomas A. Scott (1823–1881), American businessman, railway executive, and early "robber baron" industrialist
- Thomas Seaton Scott (1826–1895), Canadian architect
- Thomas H. Scott (1865–?), American architect in Pittsburgh

== Law and politics ==
=== Canada ===
- Thomas Scott (Canadian judge) (1746–1824), Canadian judge and political figure
- Thomas Scott (Ontario politician) (c. 1828–1883), Canadian politician in Ontario
- Thomas Scott (Manitoba politician) (1841–1915), Canadian politician in Manitoba
- Walter Scott (Canadian politician) (Thomas Walter Scott, 1867–1938), Canadian politician in Saskatchewan

=== United Kingdom ===
- Sir Thomas Scott (died 1594) (1535–1594), English MP and High Sheriff of Kent
- Thomas Scott (died 1610) (c. 1563–1610), English MP for Aylesbury
- Thomas Scott (died 1635), English MP for Canterbury
- Thomas Scot (died 1660), English MP and one of the regicides of King Charles I
- Thomas Scott (Bridport MP) (1723–1816) English Member of Parliament
- Thomas Scott, 2nd Earl of Clonmell (1783–1838), Irish politician

=== United States ===
- Thomas Scott (Pennsylvania politician) (1739–1796), American politician in Pennsylvania
- Thomas Scott (Oklahoma politician) (1860–1920)
- Thomas Scott (Ohio judge) (1772–1856), American jurist in Ohio
- Thomas B. Scott (1829–1886), American politician in Wisconsin
- Thomas Scott (Florida judge) (born 1948), American lawyer and federal judge

=== Elsewhere ===
- Thomas Scott (Australian politician) (1865–1946), Australian member of the Queensland Legislative Assembly

== Religion ==
- Thomas Rotherham (1423–1500), English cleric, Archbishop of York, born Thomas Scot or Scott
- Thomas Scott (preacher) (c. 1580–1626), English preacher and radical Protestant
- Thomas Scott (hymnwriter) (1705–1775), English dissenting minister and hymn writer
- Thomas Scott (commentator) (1747–1821), English Anglican clergyman and commentator on the Bible
- Thomas Hobbes Scott (1783–1860), Australian Anglican clergyman
- Thomas Fielding Scott (1807–1867), American Episcopal bishop
- Thomas Scott (publisher) (1808–1878), British publisher on religion
- Thomas Scott (bishop of North China) (1879–1956), Anglican bishop in China

== Sports ==
- Thomas Scott (cricketer) (1766–1799), English cricketer
- Thomas Scott (archer) (1833–1911), American archer and Olympian
- Thomas Scott (footballer, born 1895) (1895–1976), Scottish footballer (Falkirk FC)
- Thomas Scott (diver) (1907–?), British diver
- Thomas Scott (karateka) (born 1990), American karateka
- Thomas Scott (footballer, born 2003), English footballer (Sunderland A.F.C.)

== Others ==
- Thomas Scott (Tasmania) (fl. 1824), Australian Assistant Surveyor-General of Tasmania
- Thomas Scott (police officer) (1816–1892), New Zealand police officer and hotelkeeper
- Thomas M. Scott (1829–1876), American Confederate general
- Thomas Scott (Orangeman) (c. 1842–1870), Canadian executed during the Red River Rebellion
- Thomas Henry Scott (1889–1901), English executioner
- Pat Scott (British Army officer) (Thomas Patrick David Scott, 1905–1976), British Army general and Lord Lieutenant of Fermanagh

== See also ==
- Tommy Scott (disambiguation)
- Tom Scott (disambiguation)
- Scott Thomas (disambiguation)
