= Myra Hamilton Green =

American painter

- Born: November 28, 1924; Fayetteville, Tennessee, U.S.
- Died: March 26, 2002; Jackson, Mississippi, U.S.
- Resting place: Cedar Lawn Cemetery, Jackson, Mississippi, U.S.
- Occupation: Painter
- Spouse: Joshua Green
- Children: Lynn Green Root

Myra Hamilton Green (November 28, 1924 - March 26, 2002) was an American painter from the state of Mississippi. She specialized in portraits in acrylic paint.

== Life ==
Green was born on November 28, 1924, in Fayetteville, Tennessee. She was trained at the Art Students' League in Woodstock, New York. Green attended Virginia Intermont College.

Green specialized in portraits, and she used acrylic paint. She was a member of the Mississippi Art Colony in the 1950s-1970s, and she taught workshops and lectures, including at Belhaven College and Millsaps College. With her daughter Lynn Green Root, who was also a painter, Green exhibited her paintings at the Municipal Art Gallery in Jackson, Mississippi in 1999. The exhibition was called Myra Green and Lynn Green Root: A Mother Daughter Exhibition.

Green died on March 26, 2002, in Jackson, Mississippi, and she was buried in Cedar Lawn Cemetery. Green's family requested memorial donations to the Mississippi Museum of Art.
