= James Berry (entertainer) =

American actor and dancer

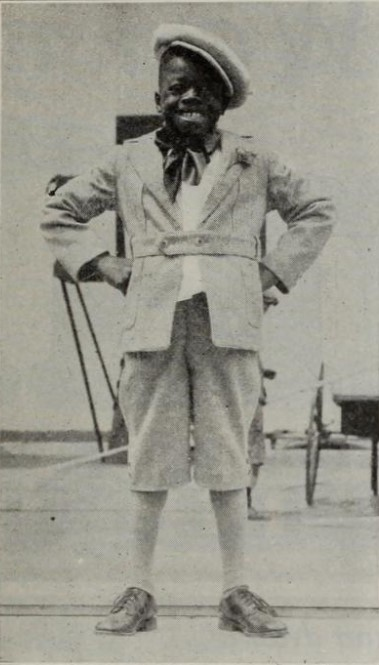
- Promotional photo of Berry in 1924
- Born: James Gerald Berry; July 9, 1915; New Orleans, Louisiana, U.S.
- Died: January 28, 1969 (aged 53); New York City, New York, U.S.
- Other name: Bubbles
- Occupation: actor

James Gerald Berry (July 9, 1915 – January 28, 1969), also known as Bubbles, was an American actor and dancer. He featured in several silent films as a child, and starred in the Berry Brothers dance duo (later a trio) alongside his brothers.

As a child, Berry and his older brother Ananias (Nyas) began performing dance routines together. The family moved to Hollywood, Los Angeles, and Berry began acting in silent comedy films with the Century Film Corporation. He formed the Berry Brothers dance duo with Nyas in the 1920s, and they were later joined by their younger brother Warren. The brothers starred in several Broadway shows together, and featured in films through the 1930s and 1940s.

== Early life ==
James Gerald Berry was born on July 9, 1915, in New Orleans, Louisiana, to Ananais and Redna Berry.

As a child, Berry and his older brother Ananais (Nyas) began touring the church circuit in Chicago, reciting poems by Paul Laurence Dunbar. The family soon moved to Denver, where Berry's younger brother Warren was born in 1922, and the duo began performing at carnivals. The elder Ananais had forbidden his children from dancing for religious reasons, but Berry persuaded his father to allow him to enter a dance contest at a local theater. He won the competition and was offered a $75 weekly contract by the theater manager, but it was rejected by his father.

James and Nyas continued performing together and created an act based on the vaudeville duo Bert Williams and George Walker, calling themselves "The Miniature Williams and Walker".

== Career ==
In the mid-1920s, the Berry family moved to Hollywood, Los Angeles, and James began performing at parties hosted by silent film stars.

In April 1924, Berry was signed by Julius and Abe Stern's Century Film Corporation to film ten comedies: he had previously worked for the brothers in two films before the contract was proposed. Berry was then given the stage name "Bubbles" due to his "effervescent antics" on screen.

While working for Century, Berry starred in several Buddy Messinger-led projects, such as the 1924 films Low Bridge and Don't Fall. In the same year, he starred in Century's film Speed Boys alongside Spec O'Donnell and Arthur Trimble.

=== Berry Brothers ===
In the 1920s, the Berry Brothers dancing duo was officially formed by James and his brother Nyas. They specialised in tap dance (although never wore tap shoes) and combined strutting with acrobatic techniques. The brothers were frequent performers at the Cotton Club, featuring in revues alongside performers like Duke Ellington.

They collaborated on several projects with Lew Leslie, a writer and producer of Broadway shows, starring in his revue Blackbirds of 1928 and touring internationally with Blackbirds of 1929. They continued to work with Leslie into the 1930s, starring in Blackbirds of 1930 and his 1931 musical Rhapsody in Black. The show also starred Valaida Snow, who later married Nyas. Following their marriage, Nyas left the act and was replaced by Berry's younger brother Warren. The brothers later formed a trio after Nyas's marriage to Snow fell apart.

From 1942 until 1943, the Berry Brothers starred in Show Time at the Broadhurst Theatre. They starred in Star Time at the Majestic Theatre in 1944.

In 1941, the brothers starred in the MGM musical Lady Be Good. In 1942, they featured in Panama Hattie. In 1948, they starred in Boarding House Blues. The following year, they starred in You're My Everything.

=== Later career ===
Following Nyas Berry's death in 1951, the two remaining brothers continued performing as a duo and individually. In 1954, Berry co-founded the Traditional Jazz Dance Company with Mura Dehn. In 1987, footage of Berry recreating his 1920s routines was featured in Dehn's documentary The Spirit Moves.

== Personal life ==
On January 28, 1969, Berry died in New York from arteriosclerosis.

== Acting credits ==
=== Film ===
Year	Title	Role	Notes	Ref.
1924	Speed Boys		As Bubbles	
1924	Low Bridge		As Bubbles	
1924	Don't Fall		As Bubbles	
1941	Lady Be Good		As the Berry Brothers	
1942	Panama Hattie		As the Berry Brothers	
1948	Boarding House Blues		As the Berry Brothers	
1949	You're My Everything		As the Berry Brothers	
1987	The Spirit Moves		Archive footage	

=== Stage ===
Year	Title	Role	Venue	Ref.
1928	Blackbirds of 1928		Broadway	
1929	Blackbirds of 1929		International tour	
1930	Blackbirds of 1930		Royale Theatre, Broadway	
1931	Rhapsody in Black		Sam H. Harris Theatre, Broadway	
1942–1943	Show Time		Broadhurst Theatre, Broadway	
1944	Star Time		Majestic Theatre, Broadway	
