= Tom Scott (painter, born 1928) =

American Abstract painter (1928–2013)

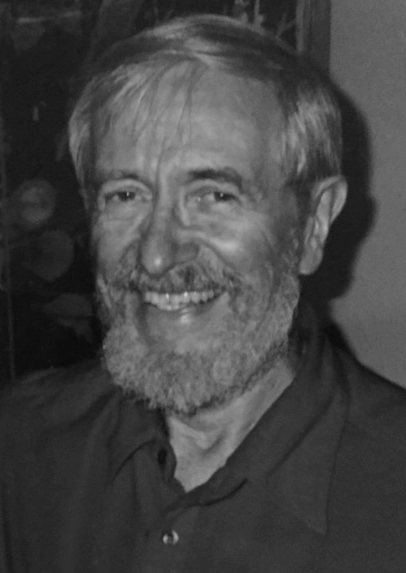

Thomas Scott (1928–2013) was an American Abstract painter, teacher and arts administrator. His career, spanning six decades, included architecture, sculpture, furniture design, photography and video and demonstrated an underlying conviction that painting needed to embrace change to remain vital. He was represented by Hilda Carmel Gallery(1961–1963), Henri Gallery (1963–1965), Studio Gallery (1986–1987) and Touchstone Gallery (1987–1999) His work is held in the collections of the University of Alabama, the Hunter Museum and UMBC as well as private collections throughout the USA and Europe. He retired from Maryland Institute College of Art as Dean of the Graduate Division in 1976.

== Early life and education ==
He was born in Chicago Illinois, to Marguerite and Walter Scott and attended Hinsdale Township High School (1942–1946). He joined the US Army Medical Corps, working as an art therapist with returning veterans (1946–1948) and attended the Art Institute of Chicago under the G.I. Bill receiving a BFA in Painting (1948–1952). He worked in Tennessee as an architectural and industrial designer for modernist Architect Hubert Bebb (1952–1955), taught at Arrowmont School of Arts and Crafts (1954–1955), was a visiting lecturer in art at the University of Tennessee, Knoxville (1955) and was a regular visitor to Black Mountain College.

== Early career 1950–1972 ==
Starting out as an Abstract Expressionist he began painting on photographs in the 1950s in response to the emerging world of digital image processing. Using a well defined photograph as a base, he added fine, hard-edged paint lines and slashes of bold colour before re-producing the painted photograph to a monumental scale and distorting it to interpret the original picture in a series of generations.

He was a supporter of the women's movement and designed a poster for the National Organisation for Women's Chicago Chapter in 1967. In 1965 he married fellow activist and feminist Ann London and they were together until her death in 1975.

As Assistant Professor of Art at the University of Alabama, Tuscaloosa (1955–1961) he taught William Christenberry and met Godmother of the Kansas City Art Gallery Scene, Myra Morgan. In 1961 he moved with his then friend, William Christenberry to New York City. He worked as Art Department Head at The Adelphi Academy Brooklyn, completed a Masters Degree in Education at New York University (1961–1963) and had his first New York solo exhibition at Hilda Carmel Gallery on Tenth Street, reviewed by Ti-Grace Atkinson in Art News

Following Linden Johnson's Elementary and Secondary Education Act of 1965 he was appointed to the Center for Urban Education (1966–1969) where he organised experimental art teaching during the New York Teachers Strike of 1968. He brought into schools clowns, puppeteers, drummers and other musicians, poets and visual artists to replace teachers who were on strike.

He supervised student teaching at the Pratt Institute Brooklyn where he worked with Dore Ashton and was Associate Professor at the College of Arts, Rochester Institute of Technology (1970–1972). Whilst upstate he would take his students to Woodstock to see the work of outsider artist and friend Clarence Schmidt.

== Mid career 1972–1985 ==
He settled in Baltimore in 1972 when he was appointed Graduate Dean and Director of Divisions for the Maryland Institute College of Art (1972–1976). He took part in annual faculty exhibitions and the school held a memorial following his death in 2013. Following retirement he worked as an art therapist at City Hospital and exhibited work with Artists Equity and Artscape in Baltimore and with Studio Gallery and Touchstone Gallery in Washington DC In 1982 he had a solo exhibition of large format painted photographs at The Women's National Bank

In the mid 1980s Scott folded the painted photographs he had been making for years, taking them off the wall and transforming them into free-standing folding screens. This was followed by a series of ‘virtual screens’ without centre panels, painting on the frames alone, and window pictures’ with shutter-like frames that swung from the walls

In 1987 four of his painted photographs and screens, including Clarence Schmidt's Garden (1985), Fells Point Stove (1972) and Sun Photo/Blue Rain (1985), were selected by Andy Grundberg, Photography Critic at The New York Times, and Sharon Keim, Executive Director, Washington Center for Photography, for the exhibition and lecture by Andy Grundberg, 'The Image and Beyond' held at Duke Ellington School for the Arts, Washington DC.

== Solo exhibitions ==
- 1955, 1957, 1959 University of Alabama, Tuscaloosa
- 1956 Hunter Gallery, Tennessee
- 1963 Tom Scott, Exhibition of Paintings, Hilda Carmel Gallery 84 East Tenth Street, New York City (8-28 March)
- 1963 Exhibition of Pictures by Tom Scott, Henri Gallery, 113 South Royal Street, Alexandria, Virginia (8-31 September)
- 1976 Tom Scott Recent Painted Photographs, Gallery 641, 641 Indiana Ave Washington DC (26 March - 17 April)
- 1982 The National Women's Bank 23rd exhibit by Washington Area Artists 1627 K Street N. W. Washington DC (12 February - 8 April)
- 1985 Paintings on Photographs/Folding Screens, Studio Gallery 420 7th Street NW Washington DC (2-26 October)
- 1987 Tom Scott, Painted Photos, Painted Screens, Painted Virtual Screens, Touchstone Gallery (June 23 - August 2)
- 1989 Tom Scott Folding Screens and Painted Photos, m Touchstone Gallery (7-26 February)
- 1992 Objects of Divination, Touchstone Gallery 2009 R Street NW Washington DC (23 June - 12 July)
- 1994 Before the Wall and Beyond, Touchstone Gallery 2009 R Street NW Washington DC (26 April - 22 May)
- 1996 Tom Scott Sculptures +, Maryland Arts Place Fells Point 1820 Aliceanna Street (7 -29 December)
- 1996 Over the Edge:Out of the Picture, Touchstone Gallery 406 7th Street NW Washington DC (16 February - 10 March)
- 1997 Tom Scott Sculptor, American Institute of Architects 11 West Chase Street Baltimore
- 1998 Opening Bound, Touchstone Gallery 406 7th Street NW Washington DC (9 September - 4 October)
- 1999 Bright Shadows: Recent work by Tom Scot, Halcyon Gallery, Margarets Cafe 909 Fell Street Fells Point (18-27 February)
- 2002 Tom Scott Painting and Sculpture, 57 Fine Art 57 N Street NW Washington DC (1 June - 24 August)
- 2002 Tom Scott Blind Reflection, L'hotel Galerie de L'ecole Régionale des Beaux-Arts de Caen (2 October - 8 November)
- 2009 Solstice, Project 1928, 1628 Bolton Street, Baltimore (13 December - 24 January 2010)
- 2014 Tom Scott Retrospective, UMBC Center for Art Design and Visual Culture (9 October- 13 December)-
- 2015 Tom Scott Transcriptions in Paint, Creative Alliance at The Patterson Baltimore (4-12 December)

== Group exhibitions ==
- 1954 Momentum, Chicago Illinois
- 1955 Forum Gallery, NYC
- 1960 Hunter Museum, Chattanooga Tennessee (8 May - 4 June)
- 1962 Hilda Carmel Gallery 84, 84 East Tenth Street, New York City
- 1964 ARCCO Henry Street Settlement 263 Henry Street, New York City (10 June)
- 1964 Knapik Gallery, NYC
- 1964 Henri Gallery, 113 South Royal Street, Alexandreia, Virginia (August)
- 1966 Lightings, Hilda Carmel Gallery 84, 84 East Tenth Street, New York City (22 April - 12 May)
- 1972, 1973, 1974, 1975 Maryland Institute College of Art Faculty Exhibition
- 1975 Alabama Bag, Gallery 641, 641 Indiana Ave Washington DC
- 1979 Southern Exposure: New works by Baltimore Artists, 1708 East Main, Richmond
- 1980, 1981,1982, 1983,1984, 1985 Artists Equity, Baltimore
- 1983 ARTSCAPE, Baltimore
- 1987 Touchstone Gallery (19 February - 23 March)
- 1987 The Image and Beyond, Duke Ellington Gallery, 35th & R Streets, NW Washington DC (19 February - 23 March)
- 1990 Object D’Art: Contemporary Folding Screens, Virginia Museum of Fine Arts (4 May - 20 July), Piedmont Arts Association (16 October - 27 November), Portsmouth Community Arts Center (8 December - 17 February 1991), Della Plaine Visual Arts Center Frederick (26 February - 30 March 1991), The Ellipse Arlington Virginia (2 May - 28 June 1991)
- 1997 Tom Scott, Dave Yocum, Matt Lucas, Studio 302, 302 South Central Avenue Baltimore (8-29 November)
- 2000 Halcyon Gallery, Margarets Cafe 909 Fell Street Fells Point (January)
- 2006 Linear Abstractions: Laura Yang and Tom Scott, Maryland Hall for the Creative Arts, 801 Chase Street, Annapolis
