= Eron Rowland =

American historian and author (c. 1862–1951)

Eron Rowland (1861/2–1951), born Eron Opha Moore and also known as Eron Moore Gregory, was a historian, author and the wife of Andrew E. Gregory until his death in 1900. She later married Dunbar Rowland, and authored some journal articles under the name Mrs. Dunbar Rowland. With Rowland, she helped develop the Mississippi Department of Archives and History which holds many of the family's papers.

Rowland was a historian for the Mississippi chapter of the National Society of the Colonial Dames of America and authored several books and articles on subjects including Varina Howell, the War of 1812 in Mississippi, and Hinds County, Mississippi.

== Writings ==
- Andrew Jackson's campaign against the British, or The Mississippi Territory in the War of 1812, concerning the military operations of the Americans, Creek Indians, British, and Spanish, 1813-1815
- two volumes on Varina Howell, the wife of Jefferson Davis
- Mississippi Territory in the War of 1812
- History of Hinds County, Mississippi, 1821-1922, a commemoration of Jackson, Mississippi's centennial
- The History of Jackson, unfinished manuscript
