= Waldo Emerson Bailey =

American consul and diplomat

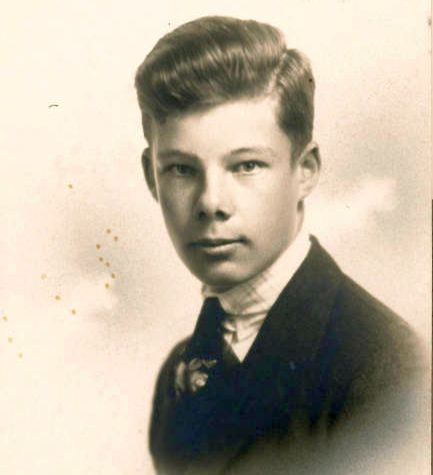
- Waldo E. Bailey in 1922
- Born: November 16, 1896; Winona, Mississippi
- Died: April 24, 1961 (aged 64)
- Resting place: Cedar Lawn Cemetery (Jackson, Mississippi)
- Occupations: Consul, U.S. Foreign Service
- Employer: United States Government
- Title: Consul

Waldo Emerson Bailey (November 16, 1896 – April 24, 1961) was a noted American Consul who held numerous positions in the U.S. Foreign Service during the first half of the 20th century.

== Biography ==
Waldo Bailey was born on November 16, 1896, in Winona, Mississippi, the youngest of 11 children. During World War I, he served overseas in the U.S. Marine Corps and was discharged in 1919.

In 1920, Bailey received a BS degree from Mississippi Agricultural and Mechanical College, and attended Kansas State Teachers College of Pittsburg in 1924. In 1927, he received a MA degree from Peabody College for Teachers in Nashville, Tennessee.

=== Career ===
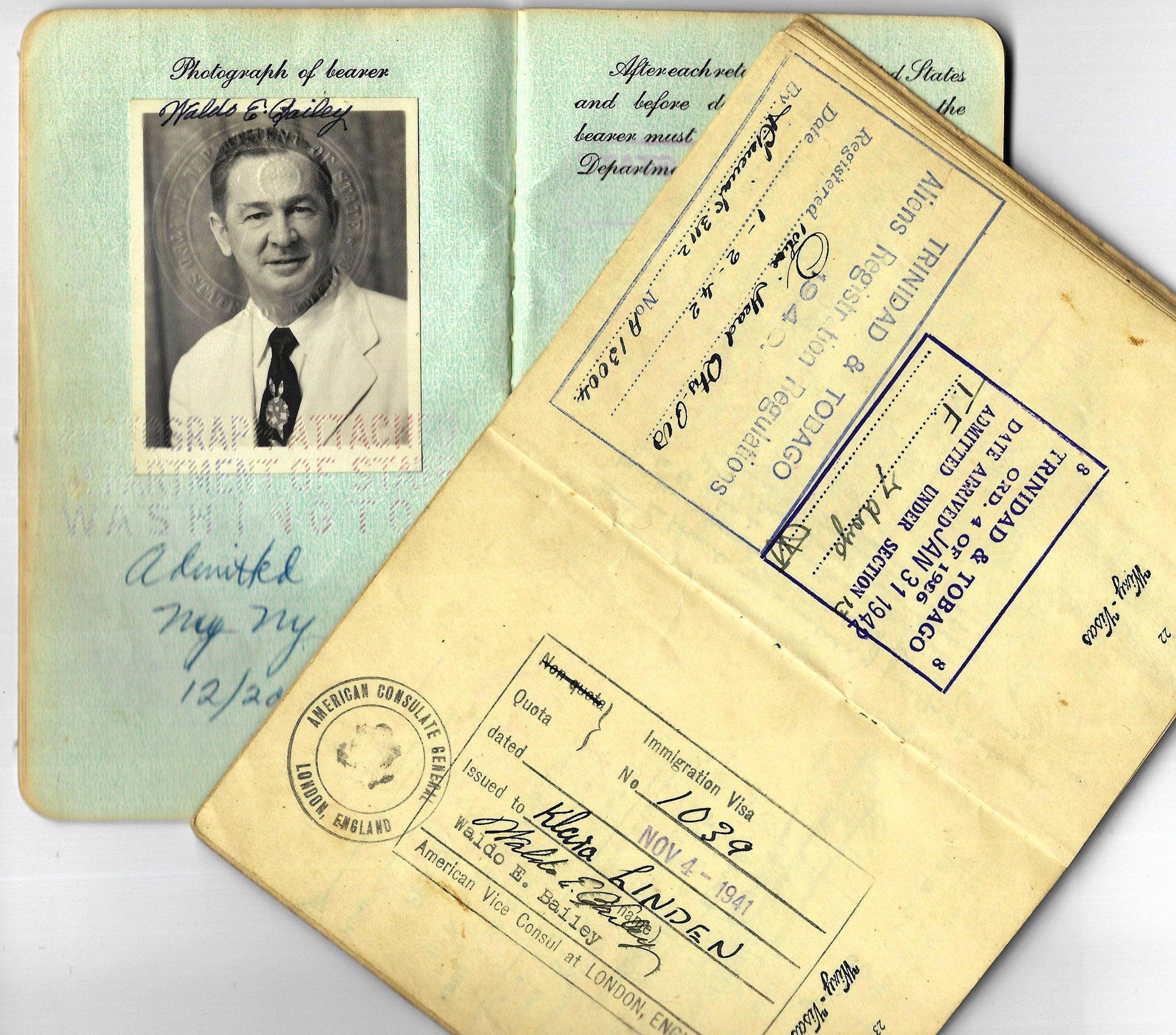
US visa issued by Waldo Emerson Bailey in 1941 while posted to the UK, next to his diplomatic passport from 1950

In 1923, Waldo Bailey began his career with the U.S. Foreign Service; his first assignment was as a consular clerk in Karachi, then Calcutta. In 1925, Bailey served as platform superintendent on a Chautauqua circuit.

U.S. Vice Consul:

- Rosario, Santa Fe, Argentina, 1926–27
- Mazatlán, Mexico, 1928–29
- Montevideo, Uruguay, 1932
- Lyon, France, 1935
- Nairobi, Kenya, 1938
- Second Secretary of Embassy and Consul in London, 1941–42

U.S. Consul in London, 1943

In September 1943, Bailey resigned from the Foreign Service to join the United States Navy and serve in World War II. He was discharged in June 1944. After his discharge, he volunteered as an ambulance driver for the British 8th Army and served in Italy. After duty in Italy, he volunteered to serve with the British 14th Army in Burma and India until 1945.

When the war ended, Bailey rejoined the U.S. Foreign Service and was assigned as American Consul in Vancouver, British Columbia, Canada in 1946. In 1946-47, Bailey became U.S. Consul in Dhahran, then Second Secretary and Consul in Jiddah, Saudi Arabia, and in Sana'a, Yemen.

By November 1947, Bailey had become Consul in Tijuana, Mexico, then Consul in Bombay, India by December 1949. While in Foreign Service, Bailey traveled to 82 foreign countries and served on all continents, with the exception of Australia.

Waldo Bailey died on April 24, 1961, and was interred in Cedar Lawn Cemetery, Jackson, Mississippi.
