= Thalia Mara Hall =

Theatre in Mississippi

Coordinates: 32°17′49″N 90°11′7″W

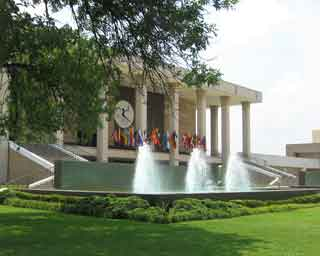
Thalia Mara Hall in Jackson, Mississippi

Thalia Mara Hall is a concert hall and theater located at 255 East Pascagoula Street in Jackson, Mississippi. It seats 2,040 people.Opened and operated by the City of Jackson, it is that city's main performing arts venue. It opened in 1968 as the Jackson Municipal Auditorium. In 1994 it was renamed for ballet dancer and director Thalia Mara. Mara founded a professional ballet company in Jackson in 1975 which used the venue. Every four years the theatre hosts the USA International Ballet Competition. For many years the theatre was used as the venue for the Opera/South opera company. It is the home concert hall of the Mississippi Symphony Orchestra. The theatre is used as a venue for touring Broadway musicals, and for concert tours among other events. It was listed on the National Register of Historic Places in 2026.

Lynn Green Root's portrait of Thalia Mara hangs in the hall.
