= Tranky Doo =

Jazz dance

The Tranky Doo being danced in Montreal in 2022

The Tranky Doo (also called Trunky Doo) is a jazz dance choreography.

A source states it was choreographed by Frankie Manning himself and ″...named in tribute to the chorus girl who inspired it.″

At that time, it was danced to Tuxedo Junction, however many modern day performances of the dance use other swing jazz songs. It is most common these days to perform the dance with the song "Dipsy Doodle" by Ella Fitzgerald because the dance appears in the Spirit Moves documentary film with a playback of the song. However the film originally had no sound, and the song "Dipsy Doodle" was artificially superimposed on that section of the film. Dipsy Doodle's structure does not fit the structure of the Tranky Doo, since the song is a 12-bar blues structure and the choreography is 32-bar swing structure.

It was common to Lindy hoppers, like the shim sham.

Step List:

Fall off the Log: Kick R on 8, L on 4 - (1) 8 count

Shuffles: step R L R L on +8+1; side-press-lunges: step R on 2, press L on 3, step L on 4 press R on 5, etc. - (1)8 count

Repeat

Forward-press-lunges: Start facing R, step R on 8, press forward on 1, hold 2.3; step L on 4, press forward on 5, clap 6.7 - (1) 8 count

Boogie Forward - (1) 8 count

Repeat

Apple Jacks - (2) 8 counts

Rocks facing R - (1) 8 count

Rocks facing forward - (1) 8 count

Boogie Back - (1) 8 count

Shorty George - (1) 8 count

Boogie Back - (1) 8 count

Break Step - (1) 8 count

Knee Slap, ba-da-dum: Slap R knee on 8 hold for 1, step R L R on +.2.3; repeat to L and R once more. [ala Big Apple] - (1.5) 8 counts

Transition: Cross L over R on 4, step R on 6, clap 7 - (.5) 8 count

Suzie Q: start L on 8 - (1) 8 count

Reverse Break: Kick R across L on 8, rock step 2.3, lock turn 4.5.6.7 - (1) 8 count

Mess Around - (1) 8 count

Fall off the Log turning: Kick R on 8, perform 1/2 the Fall off the Log while turning to the left; plant feet together 3, spread 5, together with weight L on 7. End facing forward. - (1) 8 count

Eagle Slide: Kick-ball-change step scoot step kick-ball-change lock turn. Timing is 8 + 1 2 3 4 5 + 6 7 8

Drop Boogie: R 1.2.3.4; L 5.6.7 together 8 - (1) 8 count

Mambo Walks: Tap R on 2, cross over L on 3, tap L on 4, cross over R on 5, etc. - (1) 8 count

Push Turn (paddle turn): Keep weight on L 1.2.3.4 while pushing out with R on 1 and 3, step R on 5, step L on 6, down on 7, kick R on 8 (turns 360 degrees) - (1) 8 count

Fall off the Log turning: perform 1/2 the Fall off the Log while turning to the left; plant feet together 3, float back on R 4.5.6.7.8 - (1) 8 count

Truckin': Start L on 1 - (2) 8 counts

Float Back on R 1.2.3.4.5.6.7, step L on 8 - (1) 8 count

Low Cake Walk - (1) 8 count

Walk About - (2) 8 counts

Box Step: Start crossing L over R on 1 - (3) 8 counts

Shouts: Pop hips Back 1.2, Forward 3.4, R 5.6, L 7.8 - (4) 8 counts

Clap and Point: Start with weight on L, point R leg out on 1, clap as the knee comes up on 2, etc. - (4) 8 counts

Repeat from the top until music ends.
