= Alice McElroy Procter =

American composer (1915–1987)

Alice McElroy Procter (18 April 1915 – 20 December 1987) was a widely-published American composer and educator who was the first woman to earn a Ph. D. in composition from the Eastman School of Music. She founded the American Music Company but is best remembered today for her pedagogical pieces for piano.

Procter was born in Albany to Helen H. Helen and John H. McElroy. She earned a B.A. (1935) and an M.A. (1936) from Smith College. In 1940, she earned a Ph. D. from the Eastman School of Music. Her teachers included Ross Lee Finney, Howard Hanson, Werner Josten and Bernard Rogers. Procter married fellow composer Leland Procter and they had one son and twin daughters.

Procter taught piano privately throughout her life. She also accompanied and taught for the following organizations:

- 1939–1943 taught at Southwestern State College (Weatherford, Oklahoma)
- 1957–1973 accompanied the Dedham (Massacusetts) Choral Society
- 1970–1978 taught at Milton Academy (Milton, Massachusetts)

In the early 1950s, Procter founded the American Music Company, initially to publish compositions by her husband Leland. Later, she acquired works from Gail Kubik, George Frederick McKay, H. Owen Reed, Robert Ward, and John Weinzweig. The company ended due to financial, legal, and personnel problems before many works could be distributed.

Procter taught piano at an Upward Bound summer prep program in Lenox, MA for high school students for six years. She organized the Dedham Youth Orchestra in 1951, and sang with the Dedham Choral Society before becoming its accompanist. A past vice president and former board member of the New England Pianoforte Teachers Association, she also belonged to American Women Composers Inc. and Mu Phi Epsilon, a professional music fraternity. Her music was published by Boston Music Company, Elkan-Vogel, H.W. Gray, Harold Flammer, Oxford University Press, and Summy Birchard. Her compositions included:

== Chamber ==
- Flute-prints (flute, 2 violins, viola, cello, piano)

== Handbells ==
- Festive Overture
- Minuet
- Procession

== Incidental music ==
- They Call It Macaroni

== Orchestra ==
- Overture for Youth Orchestra
- Pandora: A Dance Pantomime
- Seanachas

== Piano ==
- Daydream
- Footsteps in the Night (four hands)
- Fun for Two: Six Pieces
- Fun to Play
- Holiday Pieces (four hands)
- Lively Journey (four hands)
- Lullaby (four hands)
- March of the Moon Men (four hands)
- On the Road (four hands)
- One for You (four hands)
- Pandora (piano score for orchestral piece)
- Panorama: A Collection of Seventeen American Pieces for the Intermediate Pianist (compiled and edited by Procter)
- Pentatone: Black Key and Pedal Study
- Posse (four hands)
- Puppet Parade (four hands)
- Song for Kathleen (four hands)
- Squares Tonight (four hands)
- Swing Tune (four hands)
- Tumblers
- Village Dance (four hands)

== Vocal ==
- Chronicles 1:16 (chorus and piano)
- Quiet Hillside (chorus and piano
- Silently Came the Three Shepherds (chorus and piano; text by Rev. James F. McElroy)
- Tiny Bells Rang (chorus and piano; text by Rev. James F. McElroy)
