= Scott Thomas =

Scott Thomas may refer to:

- Scott Thomas (American football) (born 1964), American football player
- Scott Thomas (district attorney) (born 1966), American district attorney
- Scott Thomas (ice hockey) (born 1970), ice hockey player in the NHL
- Scott Thomas (footballer) (born 1974), English football (soccer) player
- Scott Thomas (director), American director of the film Plane Dead and creator of Pacific Entertainment Group
- Scott Thomas (TV personality), English television personality

== See also ==
- Thomas Scott (disambiguation)
- Thomas (surname)
