= Felicia Sorel =

American dancer (1903–1972)

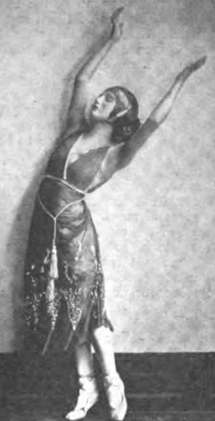
- Felicia Sorel, from a 1921 publication
- Born: September 28, 1903; New York City
- Died: September 7, 1972 (aged 68); Las Vegas, Nevada
- Occupations: Dancer, choreographer, dance captain, dance educator
- Spouse: Gluck Sandor

Felicia Sorel (September 28, 1903 – September 7, 1972) was a dancer, choreographer, and dance educator, based in New York City.

== Early life and education ==
Sorel was raised in Brooklyn Heights; her father was a physician, and her mother taught music. She trained as a dancer with Michel Fokine, Vicente Escudero, and Mary Wigman.

== Career ==
Sorel was proficient in several genres of dance, including modern, black bottom, and flamenco. She danced in Broadway shows including The Rose of Stamboul (1922), Michio Itō's Pin Wheel (1922), The Earl Carroll Vanities (1925), After Such Pleasures (1934), and Saluta (1934). She later worked as a choreographer on Broadway, including Pins and Needles (1937), Jeremiah (1939). The Gondoliers (1940), The Mikado (1940), The Pirates of Penzance (1940), The Trojan Women (1941), The Pirate (1941 to 1943), Run, Little Chillun (1943), My Dear Public (1943), Lysistrata (1946), King Henry VIII (1946 to 1947), and Louisiana Lady (1947). "Her gifts as a dancer have long been recognized," wrote The New York Times dance critic John Martin of her work on Everywhere I Roam (1939), adding that she showed additional promise as a choreographer, "designing dances for dramatic productions, and she has done it brilliantly and without compromise."

Sorel taught at the American Theatre Wing and the American Academy of Dramatic Arts. She also opened and ran a dance studio and a dance company with her first husband. Jerome Robbins was one of their students. During the 1930s she worked in the Works Progress Administration. In 1943 she helped to create the Negro Dance Company, and gave a recital at the Labor Stage Theatre.

In 1949, she launched Sorel Productions, "specializing in promotion, production and staging of fashion shows and industrial exhibits."

== Personal life ==
Sorel's first husband was fellow dancer Gluck Sandor. She died in Las Vegas in 1972, from cancer, at the age of 66.
