= Tommy Scott =

Tommy Scott may refer to:

- Tommy Scott (coach) (1907–1962), head American football coach at Old Dominion University
- Tommy Scott (cricketer) (1892–1961), West Indian cricketer
- Ramblin' Tommy Scott (1917–2013), aka "Doc" Tommy Scott, American country and rockabilly musician
- Tommy Scott (English musician) (born 1964), English musician and the lead singer, principal songwriter and guitarist of the Liverpool indie band Space
- Tommy Scott (Scottish musician) (born 1940), Scottish songwriter, producer and singer
- Tommy Scott (police officer), an officer of the Los Angeles Airport police who died in the line of duty
- Tommy Scott and the Senators, a band for which Tom Jones used to be the frontman

== See also ==
- Thomas Scott (disambiguation)
- Tom Scott (disambiguation)
