= Dunbar Rowland =

American attorney, archivist, and historian

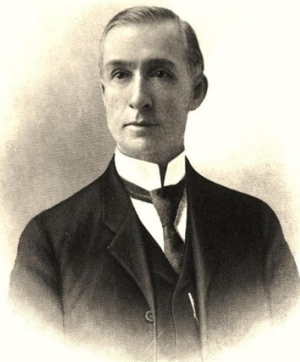
- Rowland, c. 1905
- Born: August 25, 1864; Oakland, Mississippi, C.S.
- Died: November 1, 1937 (aged 73); Jackson, Mississippi, U.S.
- Resting place: Cedar Lawn Cemetery, Jackson, Mississippi, U.S.
- Education: Mississippi Agricultural & Mechanical College (BS); University of Mississippi (JD)
- Occupations: Attorney, archivist, historian

Dunbar Rowland (August 25, 1864 − November 1, 1937) was an American attorney, archivist, and historian who served as the first director of the Mississippi Department of Archives and History from 1902 until his death in 1937.

== Early life and education ==
Born in Oakland, Mississippi, Dunbar Rowland was the youngest son of physician William Brewer Rowland and Mary Bryan Rowland. His grandfather, Creed Taylor Rowland (c.1802–c.1866), had moved from Virginia to Lowndes County, Mississippi, using enslaved African Americans as a collateral for loans that allowed him to buy up large tracts of land.

He received his primary education at private schools in Memphis, Tennessee, and prepared for college at Oakland Academy. In 1886, he received a Bachelor of Science degree from the Mississippi Agricultural & Mechanical College, then pursued a law degree at the University of Mississippi, graduating in 1888.

== Career ==
For five years, Rowland practiced law in Memphis, then moved to Coffeeville, Mississippi and set up a law office. He often submitted historical articles for publication in the Commercial Appeal, Atlanta Constitution, and Mississippi Historical Society.

In an article in the Mississippi Historical Society titled, Plantation Life in Mississippi before the War, published in 1901, Rowland acknowledged "...that the state of servitude upon which the labor system of the State [Mississippi] rested at that time [antebellum South] had much in it that was cruel, revolting and oppressive..." Further in the article, he portrayed the life of enslaved African Americans as more hopeful than it actually was:

The slave family always had a garden spot given for their own. They were taught the pride of ownership, and many families beautified their little homes with running vines and flowers. Their food was issued to them weekly from a big 'smoke-house' that was to be found on every Mississippi plantation. It was plain, wholesome, and substantial, and consisted of bread, meat, rice, and vegetables, molasses and milk.

In 1902, Rowland became the first director of the newly created Mississippi Department of Archives and History. In the early years of his tenure, he concentrated on collecting Confederate records to preserve and commemorate the sacrifice of Mississippi soldiers during the American Civil War. As Director of the State archives, he created a written History of Mississippi in three volumes, published in 1907. He traveled to Europe where he visited established archives in England and France and obtained copies of historical records pertaining to territorial Mississippi.

For the Mississippi archives, Rowland rejected the library-style arrangement of the state's records and instead developed his own system that resulted in a chronological arrangement of documents for each department of government. In archiving Confederate history in Mississippi, he compiled and edited a ten-volume collection of Jefferson Davis documents, that he published in 1923. During the 1920s, he organized the first archeological survey in Mississippi to collect Native American relics and perform excavations of mounds in the state to locate artifacts for preservation in the archives. In 1925, he compiled and published two additional volumes on Mississippi history that contained biographical accounts of the state's businessmen and politicians, History of Mississippi: The Heart of the South.

Along with other state historians, Rowland used his position in state government to lobby the Mississippi congressional delegations to create the National Archives in Washington D.C., which came to fruition in 1934. He was so involved in the process that he applied to become the first director of the National Archives but was unsuccessful. In addition to the establishment of private and public archives during his tenure at MDAH, he was able to initiate the creation of a museum and a library, plus assemble literary and artistic collections that were representative of Mississippi history and culture.

== Personal life ==
In 1906, Rowland married Eron Opha Moore Gregory, who would become an eminent historian in her own right.

== Death and legacy ==
Dunbar Rowland died on November 1, 1937, and is buried in Cedar Lawn Cemetery in Jackson, Mississippi. His portrait is part of the Mississippi Hall of Fame located in the Old Capitol Museum to honor his significant contributions to the state of Mississippi.

== Publications ==
- Dunbar Rowland (ed). 1907. Mississippi: Comprising Sketches of Counties, Towns, Events, Institutions, and Persons, Arranged in Cyclopedic Form. vol. I.
- Dunbar Rowland (ed). 1907. Mississippi: Comprising Sketches of Counties, Towns, Events, Institutions, and Persons, Arranged in Cyclopedic Form. vol. II.
- Dunbar Rowland (ed). 1907. Mississippi: Comprising Sketches of Counties, Towns, Events, Institutions, and Persons, Arranged in Cyclopedic Form. vol. III.
- Dunbar Rowland (ed). 1923. Jefferson Davis, Constitutionalist: his Letters, Papers, and Speeches. 10 vols. (catalog record)
- Dunbar Rowland. 1925. History of Mississippi: The Heart of the South. vol. I.
