= The Spirit Moves =

1987 American film directed by Mura Dehn

- DVD cover
- Directed by: Mura Dehn
- Produced by: Mura Dehn
- Edited by: Mura Dehn
- Distributed by: Dancetime Publications
- Release date: 1987
- Running time: 119 minutes
- Country: United States
- Language: English

The Spirit Moves: A History of Black Social Dance on Film, 1900–1986 is a documentary film by Mura Dehn chronicling the evolution of African-American social dance throughout most of the 20th century. In its original form it consists of nearly six hours of rare archival footage shot over the course of thirty years. Since 1987 this complete version has only been available for viewing at a select few institutions (the New York Public Library for the Performing Arts at Lincoln Center in New York City and the Smithsonian). In 2008 the first three parts of Dehn's work, totaling two hours, were remastered and released on DVD by Dancetime Publications.

== Mura Dehn ==
=== Background ===
Dehn grew up in Russia and was trained as a ballet and modern dancer in the style of Isadora Duncan. She was exposed to jazz as a child but didn't think much of it until, at the age of 20, she saw Josephine Baker perform in Paris. She was thrilled with the vitality of the style: "Before, European couple dancing was very formal—too pleasing and too relaxed. But life was not like that. We needed something to energize us, to give us abandon. The Charleston gave us the spice of rhythm and syncopation." She began to incorporate it in her work and even put on a jazz concert in Vienna in 1925. In 1930, seeking the homeland of jazz, Dehn immigrated to the United States.

=== Motivation ===
Shortly after arriving in New York City, Dehn stumbled upon the Savoy Ballroom in Harlem, an influential hotspot of African-American social dance. The dancing she found there was unlike anything she had ever seen—all of the energy of jazz she had come to love in Europe, with a characteristically American ease of movement. After immersing herself in the scene, Dehn realized what a tremendous waste it would be if such exceptional dancing was not somehow preserved for future generations. This sense of purpose took her away from her own dancing and became her life's work. Looking back on the matter years later, Dehn mused that "I sacrificed my career to promote the tidal wave of black jazz, to film the greatest dancers of the Savoy.… My contribution is to have assembled and preserved these dances as presented by their greatest exponents."

== Summary ==
=== Organization ===
There are three parts to the publicly available version of the film, with a handful of chapters each. The original editing is preserved: Each chapter is prefaced with a short narration by Dehn to establish the setting and the performers while a list of the dances and styles to be shown is displayed.

=== Themes ===
Throughout the entirety of The Spirit Moves, Dehn let her footage of the extraordinary dancing speak for itself. Her brief introductions at the beginning of each chapter do not touch upon any sociocultural analysis or other personal feelings. However, in the biographical short film In a Jazz Way, filmed shortly before her death, Dehn revealed that she was always keenly aware of the dominant feelings in African-American society and their manifestations in dance.

The Savoy dances, the main thing of the dance of that time, of the 1930s, was hope. They felt triumphant, they felt recognized. They felt that they could, through dance, through music, earn a position of equality ... Bebop was just the opposite. They found throughout during their work experience that nothing was going to be given to them, that they weren't going to be treated in the same way. Bebop is [them] turning their back on white influence, breaking up couple dancing, breaking up all the movements. It represented the broken up, disoriented, lost world in which they could only rely upon themselves.

Later, when questioned about the then-recent development of breaking (which she also documented), Dehn expressed her view that the style and its wild, athletic movements are a response to the pain and discomfort of growing up in the modern world.

== Contents ==
=== Part 1: Jazz dance from the turn of the century to 1950 ===
When Dehn first began her undertaking in the early 1930s, she faced a dilemma. To properly frame the current state of African-American social dance, she needed to record examples of styles from as early as the 1900s. As is true today, social dance progresses quickly and much had changed in the intervening decades. Unable to find the older styles performed in any of the modern venues, Dehn enlisted a group of talented dancers from the Savoy Ballroom to give demonstrations in a studio setting and fill in the gaps. The same format was also used to showcase the modern styles of dance of the 1930s and 1940s. The result is a clean, clear presentation of five decades worth of innovation in social dance that abstracts out everything but the movement of the dancers. Due to the technical limitations of film at the time, a separate soundtrack was added after recording the visuals; it features music of the same style as what was performed to by the dancers, but not necessarily the same songs.

Chapter 1 of this section focuses on Ragtime dances such as the Strut and Cakewalk, as well as Jazztime styles like the Charleston of the 1920s and the Jazz steps of the 1930s (e.g. Susie Q, Black Bottom, Shimmy). Chapter 2 is all about the Blues, featuring examples of the Rent Party, Shake Blues, and Gutbucket blues styles. Chapter 3 departs from the studio briefly to home in on practice sessions inside the Savoy: Trunky Doo, Big Apple, and Aerial Lindy are some of the styles demonstrated.

=== Part 2: Savoy Ballroom of Harlem 1950s ===
Dehn's familiarity with the Savoy Ballroom gave her the perfect setting to observe and record social dancing in its natural environment. Correspondingly, Part 2 consists of footage of the general public enjoying themselves on the dance floor. By a coincidence that could only have been deliberate, Leon James and Al Minns (two of the best Lindy Hoppers of the era) are in the crowd. Included is a dazzling recording of an aerial Lindy contest in which one of the two dancers is always in the air, with the role frequently switching between the man and woman.

=== Part 3: Postwar era, 1950s–1980s ===
When the Savoy Ballroom closed its doors for the last time in 1958, Dehn chose to depart Harlem as she continued her work. As a result, Part 3 was filmed at Public School 28 in Brooklyn and the Palladium in Manhattan. In it Dehn witnesses a complete revolution in Lindy Hop, from its fall out of popularity in the early 1960s to its revival in the mid-1980s.

=== Notable performers ===
Dehn captured performances by some of the most brilliant dancers of the age. The Spirit Moves includes footage of James Berry, Pepsi Bethel, Teddy Brown, Thomas King, Frankie Manning, Al Minns, Willa Mae Ricker, Sandra Gibson, Leon James, Scoby Strohman, and Esther Washington—among many others.

== See also ==
- Lindy Hop
- Bebop
