= Thalia Mara =

American ballet teacher and author

- Born: Elizabeth Symons; June 28, 1911; Chicago, Illinois, US
- Died: October 8, 2003 (aged 92); Jackson, Mississippi, US
- Occupation: Ballet educator

Thalia Mara Mahoney (née Elizabeth Symons; June 28, 1911 – October 8, 2003) was an American ballet dancer and educator who authored 11 books on the subject.

== Biography ==
Mara was born Elizabeth Simons in Chicago in 1911, the daughter of Russian émigré parents. After beginning her performance career in Chicago, Mara traveled to Paris in 1927. Together with her husband Arthur Mahoney, in 1962 she established the National Academy of Ballet and Theatre Arts in New York. Prior to that they ran Ballet Repertory in New York City. After living in New York, Mara moved to Jackson, Mississippi, where she helped found the USA International Ballet Competition. She authored eleven books on ballet, as well as founded the Thalia Mara Arts International Foundation. she died in 2003 at 92.

== Legacy ==
In recognition of her contributions, the Jackson Municipal Auditorium in Jackson, Mississippi was renamed Thalia Mara Hall in 1994.

Another performance venue, the Thalia Hall in the Pilsen Historic District located at 18th Street and Allport Street on Chicago's Lower West Side, is also named after her.

== Works ==
- Mara, Thalia (1987). The Language of Ballet: A Dictionary. Princeton, New Jersey: Princeton Book Company.
