= Cedar Lawn Cemetery (Jackson, Mississippi) =

Cemetery in Hinds County, Mississippi

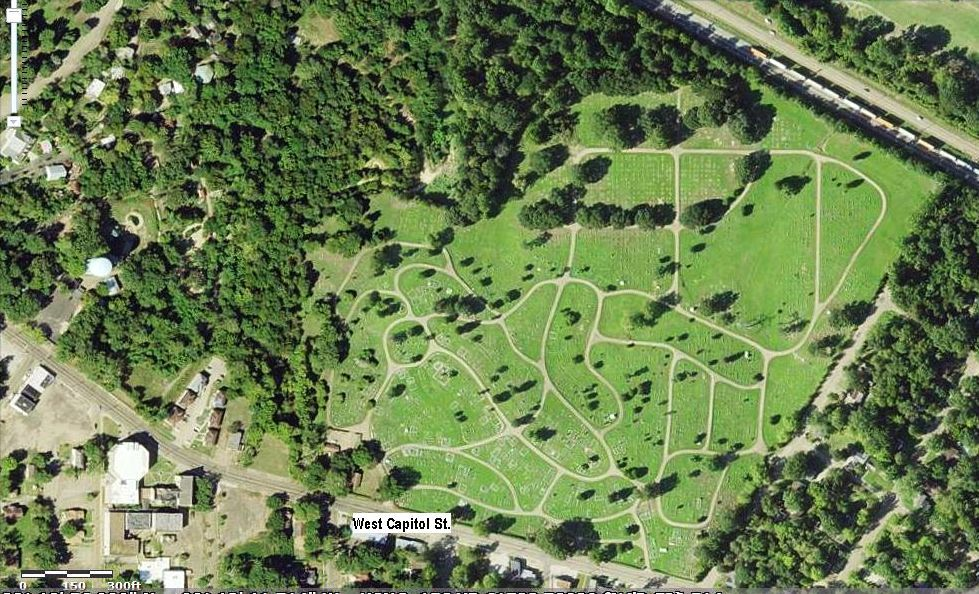
- Aerial view of Cedar Lawn Cemetery
- Interactive map of Cedar Lawn Cemetery

Details
- Established: 1899
- Location: 2434 West Capitol Street, Jackson, Hinds County, Mississippi, U.S.
- Country: United States
- Coordinates: 32°19′06″N 90°13′00″W
- Size: 75.8 acres (30.7 ha)
- No. of graves: >14,000 (July 2015)
- Find a Grave: Cedar Lawn Cemetery
- The Political Graveyard: Cedar Lawn Cemetery

Cedar Lawn Cemetery, also known as Cedarlawn Cemetery, was created in 1899, becoming the second official public cemetery for the city of Jackson, Mississippi.

== Notable interments ==
- Julian P. Alexander (1887–1953), associate justice Supreme Court of Mississippi (1941–53).
- Waldo Emerson Bailey (1896–1961), American Consul.
- Theodore DuBose Bratton (1862–1944), served as Bishop of Mississippi in The Episcopal Church from 1903 until 1938.
- Myra Hamilton Green (1924–2002), Mississippi artist who specialized in portraits and still life.
- Andrew Houston Longino (1854–1942), 35th Governor of Mississippi, in office 1900–04.
- Dunbar Rowland (1864–1937), historian and archivist who served as Director of Mississippi Department of Archives and History for 35 years.

=== Flying Dutchmen ===
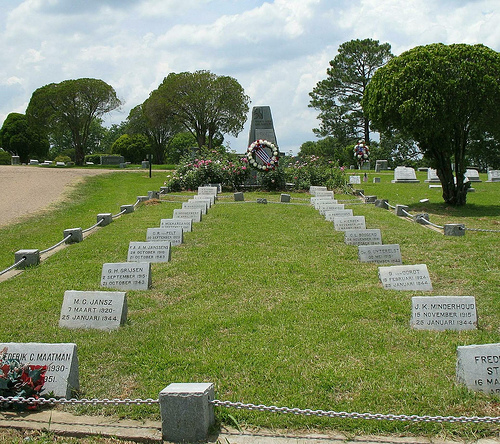
Dutch memorial and grave sites in Cedar Lawn Cemetery

In the early years of World War II, Nazi Germany occupied the Netherlands. Between 1942 and 1944, the United States permitted 500 displaced Dutch aviators to train at Jackson Army Airbase, which became known as the Royal Netherlands Military Flying School. During those years, more than two dozen Dutchmen were killed in local training accidents. In recognition of their service, the City of Jackson donated a plot of ground within Cedar Lawn Cemetery to the Netherlands for burial of their dead.

== See also ==
- Begraafplaats Cedar Lawn
- National Register of Historic Places listings in Hinds County, Mississippi
