= Thomas Scott (police officer) =

Thomas Scott (1816–1892) was a New Zealand police officer, mail carrier, storekeeper, ferryman and hotel-keeper. He was born in Kilconquhar, Fife, Scotland in 1816.
