= Mura Dehn =

American filmmaker (1905–1987)

Mura Ziperovitch Dehn (1905 – 1987) documented African-American social jazz dancing at the Savoy Ballroom in New York in the 1930s and 1940s, a time that she referred to as the "Golden Age of Jazz." She also worked as a producer and documenter up until her death, and was co-artistic director of Traditional Jazz Dance Theater, along with vaudeville performer James Berry.

== Biography ==
Born 1905, Dehn was raised in Russia where she was schooled in ballet and modern dance by Ellen Tels, a student of Isadora Duncan. She realized early on that dance would be her passion in life. During her training she was exposed to many styles of dance, including jazz. However, she did not become interested in the style of jazz dance until later.

In 1925, Dehn ventured to Paris in hopes of furthering her dance career. There, she saw Josephine Baker perform. At that time in Paris, Baker was regarded as one of the best jazz dancers in the country, and was extremely popular. Mura Dehn then realized that she was very attracted to jazz dance. She instantly became a fan and decided to take up jazz dance to see where it would lead her.

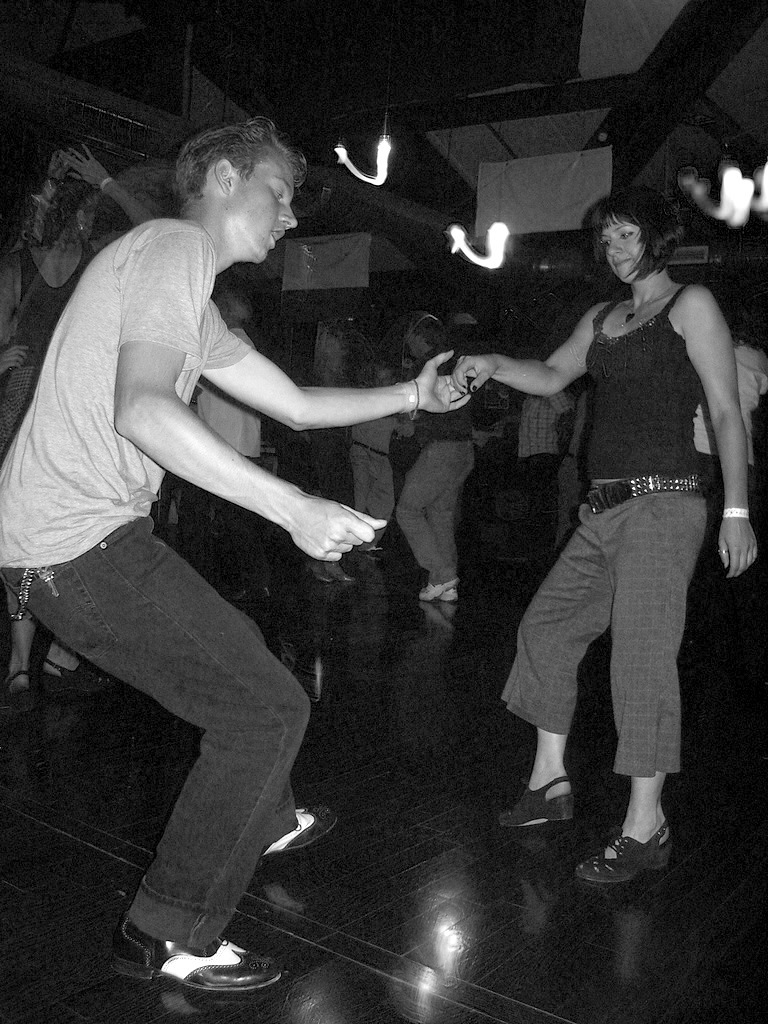
Modern dancers doing the Lindy Hop, 2006.

By 1930, Mura Dehn had immigrated to New York City with her husband Adolf Dehn, an American painter and lithographer she had met in Paris. The Dehns divorced, but remained friendly. One night in New York Dehn stumbled across the Savoy Ballroom. Inside, she witnessed dancing that was completely foreign to her and she loved it.

In 1930, while performing in Billy Rose's "Sweet and Low" that she met another performer, Roger Pryor Dodge, the ballet dancer turned jazz dancer who had been performing his choreography to Bessie Smith, Louis Armstrong, and Duke Ellington. Dodge and Dehn became immediate dance partners, first performing his creations together in 1931, which he eventually filmed in 1937. Dodge's understanding of the importance of film to dance was informed years earlier by the reality that no films existed of Vaslav Nijinsky. This insight possibly inspired Dehn's pursuit as filmmaker to document jazz dancers. She henceforth took it upon herself to record what she saw for later generations.

This process was a long and hard one that took many, many years but she believed it had to be done. She also believed that African-Americans, through authentic jazz dancers, changed the way the world experienced rhythm and viewed the dancing body. In the end she created two films: The Spirit Moves and In A Jazz Way.

The Spirit Moves: A History of Black Social Dance on Film, 1900-1986 is her five-hour documentary about the evolution of black dance in urban America in the early 1900s-to the mid-Eighties. The film is a unique visual record of vernacular jazz dancing that celebrated the heritage of movement that shaped the way we dance, on and off stage.

In a Jazz Way: A Portrait of Mura Dehn is a short biographical film created about Mura Dehn, including some of her work with the Savoy Ballroom dancers as well as with hip-hop artists in the 1980s.
