= Clarence Schmidt =

American sculptor

Clarence Schmidt (September 11, 1897 in Queens, New York – November 9, 1978 in Woodstock, New York) was an “outsider artist” and a pioneer of monumental environmental sculpture. His ongoing life's work, the “Miracle on the Mountain,” was constructed of found objects and recycled materials between the years 1940-1972, which evolved on the back slope of Ohayo Mountain, in Woodstock NY.

== Biography ==
Clarence Schmidt attended high school in Astoria Queens, NY, before dropping out to work alongside his father as a mason and plasterer. One account mentions him building sets for silent films — a potent metaphor for what was to come.

In 1920 Schmidt inherited five acres of land off Ohayo Mountain, near Woodstock NY; around 1928 he convinced his wife Grace to summer with him there. The couple alternated living in NYC and Woodstock through the 1920s and '30s, and finally settled in Woodstock in the late 1930s when Schmidt finished his first house there, built in a “Swiss Family Robinson,” style.

Beginning with a cabin made of railroad ties, the building was rough, but solid and conventional enough to sell. Schmidt called the place, “Journey’s End".

Around 1940 Schmidt cleared another corridor down Ohayo and built a cabin for his own use at its base. It was here, that additional rooms, terraces, caves, gardens, grottos, a pool, shrines and further wings were stacked upon one another, advancing up the mountain's face, demanding continuous expansion, until a seven-story extension hung off the backside of Ohayo. Schmidt and the house were featured in a photo essay in the 12 Sept., 1964, issue of the Saturday Evening Post.

In Jan 1968, the structure, which was largely held together with a type of roofing tar, caught fire, and burned almost entirely.

At first thought to have, himself, become victim of the fire, Schmidt was found days later sleeping in a doorway in the village. Put up in a local rooming house (The Shady Townhouse, in Shady a hamlet of Woodstock) for the winter, he recuperated until the warmer season. After the first fire which decimated his “Garden of Hope” he was quoted, in the Woodstock Week thus: “I’ve suffered Dante’s Inferno and every other thing...but I’ll get back up there sooner than you think...I’m doing a lot of writing now. I’m creating a Bible, and it’s based on genetic religion.”

About that time, he separated from his wife, who continued to live in the area. For the first half of that period she’d been an eccentric beauty transplanted during the Depression from her native Queens to a dwelling built by her even more eccentric husband and cousin.

Soon after, Schmidt commenced building another abode that became a large treehouse with many architectural and artistic embellishments.

Amid legal disputes over property boundaries, alleged precarious mental health of his son, bickering with his estranged wife and neighbor, and ever-mounting fame Schmidt continued his work. He was quoted as saying “Don’t forget there were a good many years when I had to hold a flashlight in my mouth to see what I was doing, when night came upon me. I was afraid of dying before I could get the house done.” In 1972 the treehouse also caught on fire, while he was sleeping in it, likely caused by the makeshift heating and lighting he implemented. Schmidt was badly burned, hospitalized, and never fully recovered. He became a Medicaid patient at Hadley's Nursing Home on Albany Avenue in Kingston. For five years, he'd spend most of the day waving at hundreds and thousands of passers by. In 1976 the nursing home was cited for state codes violations and half of their residents were farmed out. Schmidt protested his transfer, but was resettled in Greene County Nursing Home. However, he soon warmed to the place.

Two years later, on November 9, 1978, he died there, of heart failure. Schmidt was sent off to Greenburgh for cremation, his ashes then delivered to Lasher Funeral Home, in Woodstock.

His ashes were lost, but then rediscovered in Sept. 2010, when his wife was cremated.

A true eccentric, Schmidt compared himself to Rip Van Winkle, Paul Bunyan, Robin Hood, and Baron Munchausen; "I became some greater part of this mountain up here. Why when I walked along the road, the trees knelt down on my behalf. . . .There I was — in the land of ecstasy!"
