= André Maugars =

André Maugars (c. 1580 – c. 1645) was a French viola da gamba player. Marin Mersenne described him, along with Nicolas Hotman, as the most excellent French viola da gamba virtuoso, in particular, improviser of diminutions.

He is first identified as a musician attached to Henriette Marie de France, and follows her to London after her marriage to Charles I of England in 1625. He stayed there until about 1627 and was probably in the service of James I of England in his court orchestra. After his return, he published a French translation of Francis Bacon's letter Advancement of learning. He worked first as a translator at the French court, later for the Cardinal Richelieu. This gained him in 1630 the office of prior of Saint-Pierre-Eynac in Le Puy-en-Velay. In 1634, he published a translation of another of Bacon's letters, Considerations Touching on a War with Spain. In 1637 or in the next years, he travelled to Rome. Following this journey, he wrote the account in the form of a letter Response faite à un curieux sur le sentiment de la musique en Italie, escrite à Rome, le 1er octobre 1639 (Response to an Inquisitive Person on the Italian Feeling about Music, wrote in Rome on 1st October 1639) about his experiences from his Italian journey, which was published posthumously in 1672. This account is a valuable historical musical testimony about the contemporary Italian church music, oratorio and instrumental music in comparison with the French music of his time.
