= Tom Scott (composer) =

American composer and singer (1912–1961)

- Born: Thomas Jefferson Scott; May 28, 1912; Campbellsburg, Kentucky, U.S.
- Died: August 12, 1961 (aged 49); New York City, U.S.
- Education: University of Kentucky
- Occupations: Composer, singer
- Spouse: Ruth Walton
- Children: 1

Thomas Jefferson Scott (May 28, 1912 – August 12, 1961) was an American composer and singer.

== Biography ==
Scott studied music at the University of Kentucky, after which he moved to New York City when he joined Fred Waring's glee club. He was soon employed by the group as an arranger. In 1942, he began a successful career as a folk singer. He accompanied himself on the guitar and billed himself as "The American Troubadour". He appeared at the Rainbow Room and the Cotillion Room of the Pierre Hotel, among other venues. Garnering praise, Scott landed his own radio show, which ran for several years.

Although Scott did write some of his own folk songs, he is mostly remembered now for his classical works, and in particular his symphonic pieces, which for the most part are rooted in American folk music. His symphonic works include Ballad of the Harp Weaver, Binorie Variations, Colloquy for Strings, Coney Island, Fanfare and Cantilena, Hornpipe and Chantey, Johnny Appleseed, Music for String Orchestra, and Symphony No. 1. His work From the Sacred Harp was performed and recorded in its world premiere by the New York Philharmonic under the baton of Leopold Stokowski.

Among his other compositions are chamber music works, art songs, piano songs, the opera The Fisherman (1956), and several television and film scores. He wrote much music for plays at the Robert Herridge theater, and also wrote the music for Ferdinand Bruckner's play Gloriana, which premiered on Broadway in 1938. Scott wrote most of the music for Camera Three, among other television shows. He married Ruth Walton and they had one daughter, Susanna Scott. He died of a heart attack in 1961.
