= Gluck Sandor =

American actor (1899–1978)

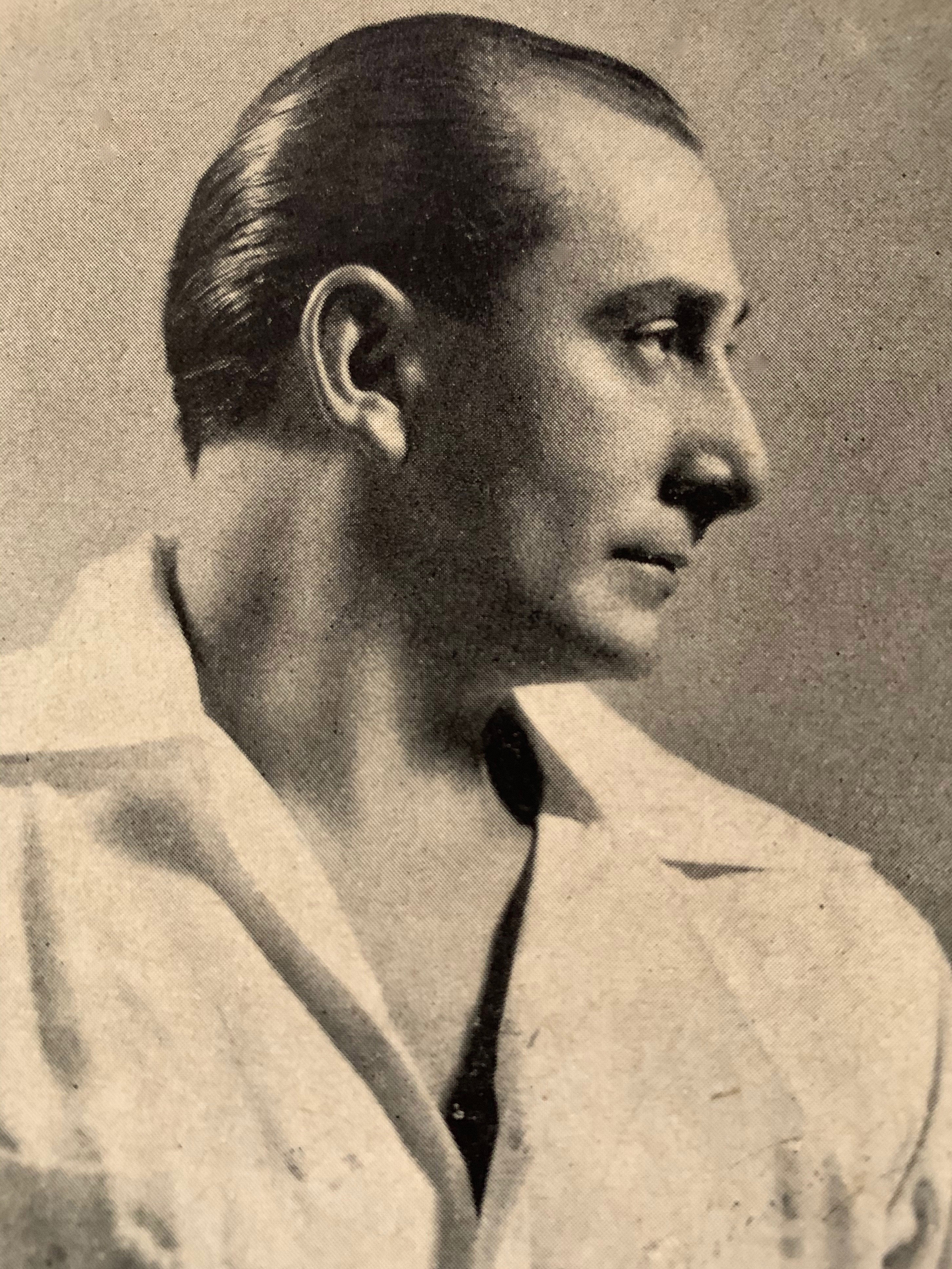
Gluck Sandor, American Artist

Gluck Sandor (1899–1978), aka Senia Gluck-Sandor, was an American artist, dancer, director, producer, actor, mime and teacher. He made his stage debut in the Met Opera production of Le Coq d'Or in 1918, and continued to choreograph, dance, and act in several Broadway productions from the 1920s through the early 1970s. He married dancer and choreographer Felicia Sorel, and in 1931 they opened The Intimate Theatre in New York City where they taught dance, mime, choreography, and dance theory. In 1930 he went to Europe to study with the Wigman school of Modern Dance and returned to N.Y. in September 1931. Sandor and Sorel, established "The Dance Center" a dance school and a professional dance company of the same name. In 1977, a retrospective exhibition of Sandor's paintings toured small galleries in Florida and New York. Gluck Sandor died in 1978 in New York City.

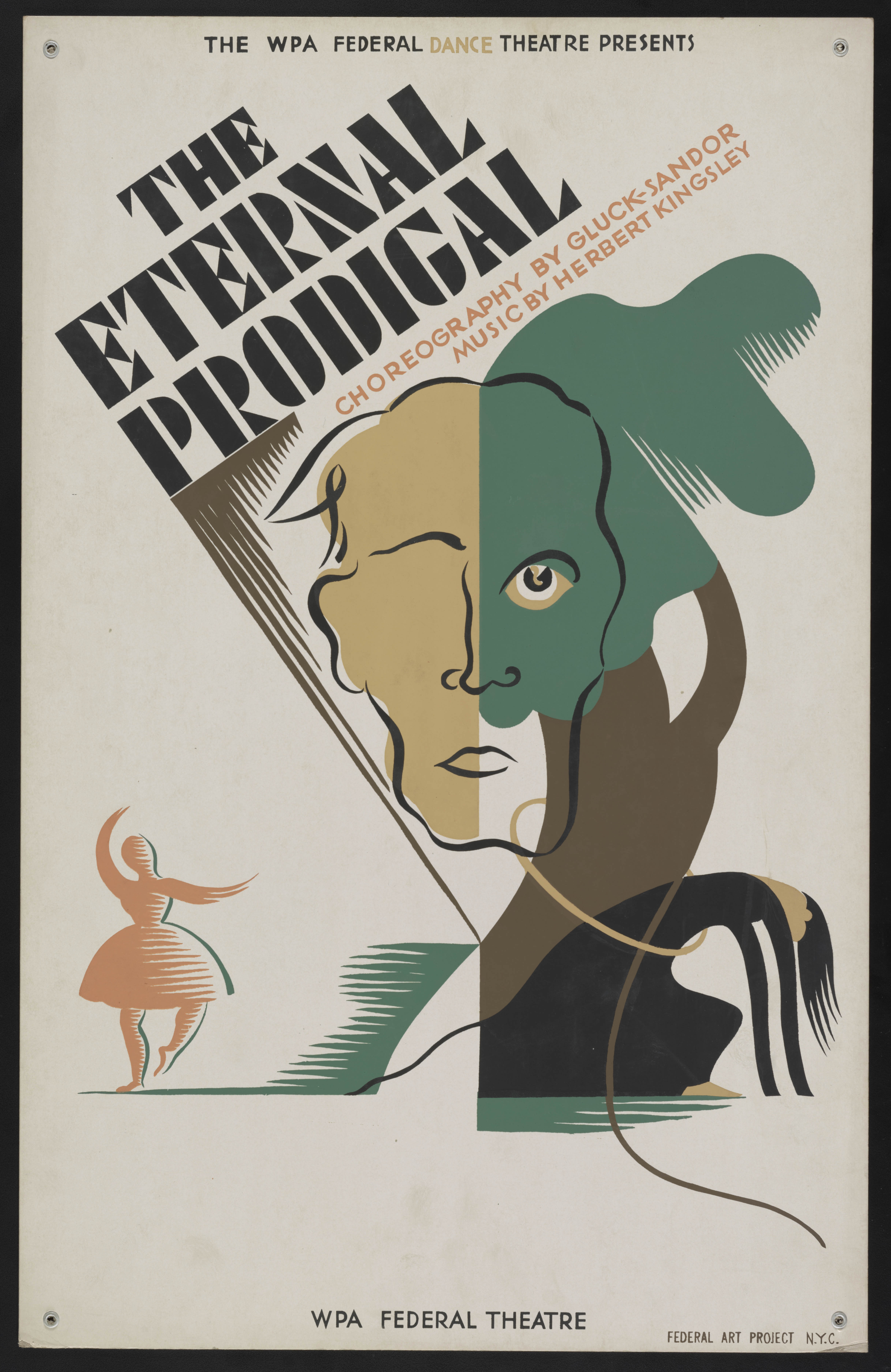
The WPA Federal Dance Theater Poster, The Eternal Prodigal, Choreographed by Gluck Sandor

Among those who have studied with or been directed by Sandor are John Garfield, Bing Crosby, Lena Horne, Dane Clark, Felicia Sorel, Jerome Robbins, Robert Lewis and Elia Kazan. He is remembered for his Broadway role as the original Rabbi in Jerome Robbins' "Fiddler on the Roof" (1964–1970).

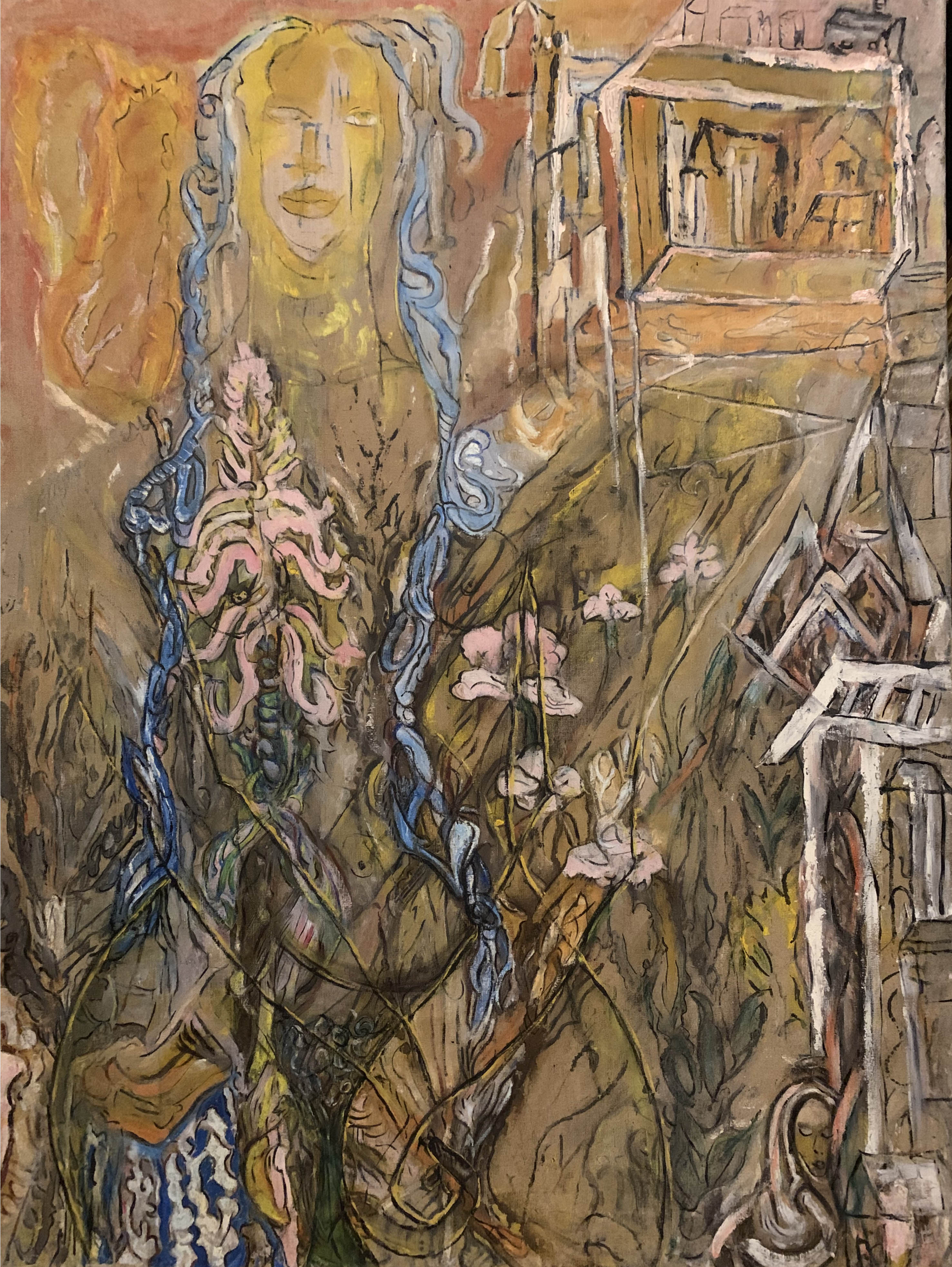
Gluck Sandor, Girl With Blue Hair, 27" x 36" 1977, Oil on Canvas

== Early life ==
Sandor was born in Harlem, N.Y. July 4, 1899 and left home at the age of 14 to seek his independence. He attended Townsend Harris High School at C.C., N.Y. for gifted children. He joined the famous Henry Street Settlement where he studied drama, dance, scene designs and theatre arts. He performed at the Rivoli Movie Theater, The Earl Carroll Theater, the Hippodrome and staged shows at Paramount Theater. Sandor also created the first ballets ever done on Broadway for the first "Vanities" in 1923. Sandor continued to choreograph dance productions as well as teach and perform through the 1920s in major theaters in New York, Philadelphia, and Chicago.

== Later life ==
Interested in the visual arts at an early age. Sandor painted silk scarfs at the age of 17 and begin painting on canvas in 1920. In 1938, he disbanded his dance theater and became more serious about painting, studying life drawing, technique and color and studied graphic arts at the Art Students League in New York. He had numerous one-man exhibitions; at the Art Center in Brooklyn in 1955, in Tampa Florida, Woodstock N. Y., and Prince Street Gallery SoHo in New York City.
