= Werner Josten =

German composer

Werner Erich Josten (June 12, 1885 in Elberfeld, Germany – February 6, 1963 in New York City) was a German-born composer of contemporary classical music. He studied in Munich with Rudolf Siegel and in Geneva with Émile Jaques-Dalcroze, and emigrated to the United States in 1920 or 1921. He became a naturalized citizen and taught at Smith College in Northampton, Massachusetts from 1923 to 1949, where his notable students included Audrey Kooper Hammann and Alice McElroy Procter. The Werner Josten Performing Arts Library at Smith College is named for him.

He is best known for his symphonic poem Jungle (1928), which is inspired by African music. He also directed the first staged performance of Claudio Monteverdi’s L'Orfeo in the United States on May 11, 1929.

He was married to Margaret Fatman, a member of the Lehman family and granddaughter of Meyer Lehman, co-founder of Lehman Brothers; they had two children: Peter Josten and Eileen Josten Lowe.

== Bibliography ==
- Marchbanks Press (1964). Werner Josten, 1885-1963; a summary of his compositions with press reviews. New York: Marchbanks Press.
