= Hot Shots (dance companies) =

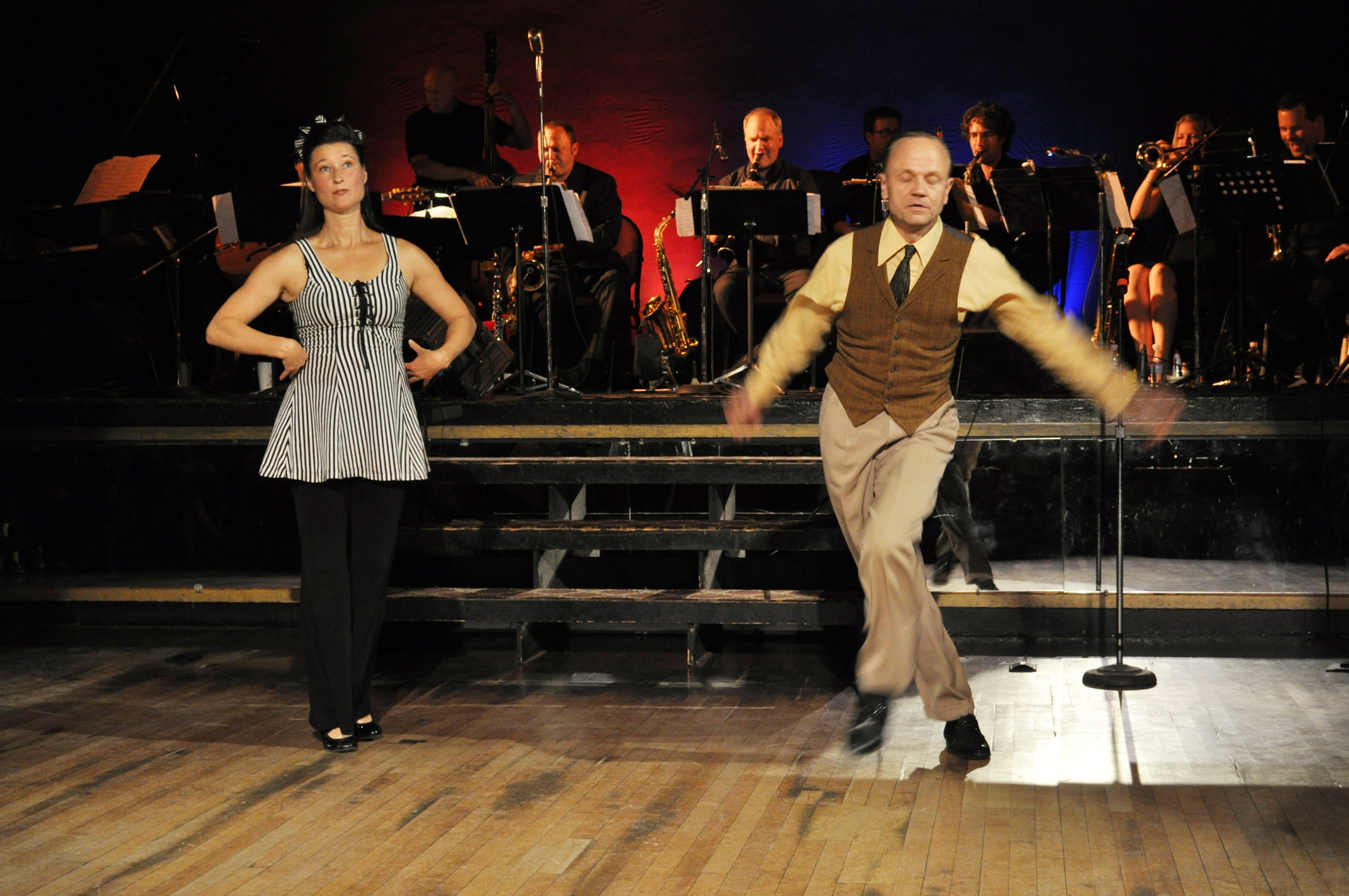
Catrine Ljunggren and Lennart Westerlund performing at Masters of Lindy Hop and Tap, Century Ballroom, Seattle, Washington, 2009.

The Hot Shots is a collective name for two closely related Swedish dance companies based in Stockholm, Sweden: The Rhythm Hot Shots and the Harlem Hot Shots. The Hot Shots specialize in faithful reproductions of African-American dance scenes in American films from the 1920s, 30s, and 40s. Dances that they perform include Lindy Hop, Tap dance, Cakewalk, Charleston, and Black Bottom. The members of the Hot Shots are also respected dance instructors and accomplished social dancers. The goals of The Rhythm Hot Shots and the Harlem Hot Shots are the same.

On 6 May 2005, all of the current and previous members of the Hot Shots celebrated 20 years by performing "20 Years With the Hot Shots" at Södra Teatern in Stockholm.

== The Rhythm Hot Shots ==
The Rhythm Hot Shots (TRHS, officially The Rhythm Hot Shots Dance & Show Handelsbolag or TRHS Dance & Show HB) is a Swedish performance dance company founded in 1985 and dissolved in 2002. Members of The Rhythm Hot Shots were instrumental in the 1980s and 90s Lindy Hop revival.

=== Members ===
Founding member

1985–1986	(Sweden) Lena Ramberg
1985–1988	(Sweden) Anders Lind
1985–2002	(Sweden) Lennart Westerlund
1985–2002	(Sweden) Catrine Ljunggren
1985–2002	(Sweden) Eddie Jansson
1985–2002	(Sweden) Eva Lagerqvist Jansson, née Eva Lagerqvist
1986–199?	(Sweden) Ewa 'W' Staremo Burak, née Ewa Staremo
1988–1989	(Sweden) Lars Lundberg
1990–1994	(Sweden) Martin Wedby
1991–1994	(Sweden) Anita Kankimäki
1993–1995	(Sweden) David Dalmo
1994–2002	(Sweden) Ulrika Larsdotter Ericsson, née Ulrika Ericsson
1997–2002	(Sweden) Åsa Palm
1997–2001	(Switzerland) Benedikt "Beni" Furrer
199?–2001	(Sweden) Ulrika Thulin
1998–2002	(Sweden) Mattias Lundmark
2000–2002	(Sweden) Hanna Zetterman
2002	(Sweden) Frida Segerdahl
2002	(Sweden) Sakarias Larsson

=== Collaborators ===
Other dancers, including former members, have performed with The Rhythm Hot Shots on various occasions.

Year	Dancer	Performance
1990	(United States) Harold Nicholas	Come to Broadway (production)
1996	(United States) Norma Miller	Jumpin´ at the Jubilee (production)
1997	(Sweden) Kenneth & Helena Norbelie	Swing Camp Catalina (dance camp)
2000	(United States) Diane van Haaren (née Thomas)	What is this Thing called Swing? (USA tour)
2001	(United Kingdom) Angela Andrew, (United States) Chazz Young	Herräng Swing Bus (Europe tour)
2002	(United Kingdom) Angela Andrew, (United States) Chazz Young	Herräng Swing Bus (Europe tour)

(Incomplete)

== Harlem Hot Shots ==
The Harlem Hot Shots (HHS, sometimes spelled Harlem Hotshots) is a Swedish dance company formed in autumn 2002 that includes several members of The Rhythm Hot Shots.

=== Members ===
Founding member

2002–present	(Sweden) Frida Segerdahl
2002–present	(Sweden) Sakarias Larsson
2002–present	(Belgium) (Sweden) Fatima Teffahi
2005–present	(Sweden) Jenny Deurell
2008–present	(Sweden) Rikard Ekstrand
2008–present	(Sweden) Jessica Lennartsson
2008–present	(Sweden) Frida Borg
2008–present	(Sweden) Pontus Persson
2012–present	(Sweden) Fredrik Dahlberg
2012–present	(Sweden) Mimmi Gunnarsson
2014–present	(Sweden) Gabriella Rosati
2016–present	(Sweden) Nils Nygårdh
2016–present	(Sweden) Patrik Pettersson
2017–present	(Sweden) Lizette Rönnqvist
2018–present	(Sweden) Frida Häggström
2002–2011	(Sweden) Lennart Westerlund
2002–2007	(Sweden) Hanna Zetterman
2002–2007	(Sweden) Mattias Lundmark
2002–2007	(Sweden) Åsa Palm
2002–2007	(Sweden) Daniel Heedman
2002–2004	(Sweden) Johanna Müller

=== Collaborators ===
Other dancers, including former members of the Hot Shots, have performed with the Harlem Hot Shots on various occasions.

Year	Dancer	Performance
2003	(United States) Ria DeBiase	Spirit of Swing (USA/Canada tour)
2004	(United Kingdom) Angela Andrew, (United States) Mike Faltesek	Herräng Swing Bus (Europe tour)

(Incomplete)

== History ==
Anders Lind began studying at the Royal Institute of Technology (KTH) in Stockholm, Sweden in 1978 and became interested in swing dance as a student. He became a member of the Swedish Swing Society (SSS, formed in 1978), a dance club that originally focused on competition and show. The Swedish Swing Society initially recruited dancers from Lasse Kühlers dance school. So when Lennart Westerlund started to dance at Lasse Kühlers dance school in 1980, he was recruited into the Swedish Swing Society in 1981, where he met Anders Lind. Lennart Westerlund, Catrine Lunggren, Anders Lind, and Lena Ramberg started to dance together in a small performance group as a part of the Swedish Swing Society in 1983.

Anders Lind became interested in searching for the history of the dance and in autumn 1983, he found a copy of "Jazz Dance: The Story of American Vernacular Dance" by Marshall and Jean Stearns in an unknown library in Dansmuseet (dance museum). Excited about the discovery, he copied three chapters of the book and handed them out to his fellow SSS members. Prior to finding "Jazz Dance", everyone believed that Jitterbug was a dance that originated from the 1940s. They learned from the book that Jitterbug was originally called Lindy Hop and originated in Harlem, NY during the end of the 1920s.

At the age of 15, Eddie Jansson and Eva Lagerqvist started dancing at Lasse Kühlers dance school, where they met each other in 1983. After one year at the dance school, they joined the Swedish Swing Society. Eddie and Eva and another couple formed a group called Dance Freaks in spring 1984. Dance Freaks performed together one time before splitting up.

"Jazz Dance" listed several films that included Lindy Hop sequences. When A Day at the Races was shown in a theater in Stockholm, Anders and Lennart went to watch the movie. They found the dance sequences so exciting that they returned with a video camera to record all of the dance scenes. When Hellzapoppin' was shown at the KTH student theatre, they were in awe by the dancing in the film. The speed, acrobatics, and skill of the dancers was like nothing they had ever seen before. They started discussing a trip to New York City to find someone who could teach them how to dance the same way.

In April 1984, Anders Lind, Lennert Westerlund, and Henning Sörensen (Secretary for the Swedish Swing Society) travelled to New York City seeking Al Minns, a surviving member of Whitey's Lindy Hoppers that Anders had found in "Jazz Dance". While in Stockholm, Anders Lind had found a copy of the New York City yellow pages and torn out the pages listing dance schools. When they arrived in NYC, Anders Lind decided to call the dance schools that taught Lindy Hop. As luck would have it, the first dance school he called also happened to be the one that Al Minns taught it. They ended up meeting Al Minns two days later at a nightclub.

Count Basie had just died and his band members as well as the artists and dancers that had worked with him had planned a memorial dance in his honor at The Red Parrot, a nightclub in New York City. Anders Lind learned about the event and the three Swedes showed up at the nightclub and found Al Minns dancing Lindy Hop there. Al Minns had started teaching at Sandra Cameron Dance Center in 1982 and invited them to his dance class. Anders Lind also took the opportunity to take some classes with Norma Miller. When they returned to Sweden, Henning recommended to the board members of the Swedish Swing Society to invite Al Minns to Stockholm to teach and give lectures. Despite having a fear of flying, Al Minns traveled to Sweden in October 1984 for a 5-day workshop and brought a different approach to the dance with him. He told them to "Forget counting, just listen!".

During the summer of 1984, the Swedish Swing Society arranged for the SSS performance group to perform for a few shows during the Stockholm Jazz Festival. The group asked Eddie and Eva to join them and for their first performance, the three couples performed on the main stage in front of 2000 people while accompanied live by The Harlem Blues & Jazz Band. The performances were very successful and afterwards the three couples considered working together in the future, perhaps at a professional level.

After months of discussion, Lennart Westerlund, Anders Lind, Eddie Jansson, Catrine Ljunggren, Lena Ramberg and Eva Lagerqvist decided to form a dance company in the summer of 1985 when The Harlem Blues & Jazz Band returned to Stockholm. They called themselves The Rhythm Hot Shots. Lennart danced with Catrine, Eddie danced with Eva, and Anders danced with Lena.

Al Minns was invited back to Stockholm in 1985 but he became too ill to travel and died on 24 April 1985. From Al Minns, TRHS learned that Frankie Manning, another surviving member of Whitey's Lindy Hoppers, was also living in New York City. In 1986, Lennart contacted Frankie Manning and in 1987, invited Frankie to Sweden for the first time to work with the dance company.

Before Frankie Manning visited Sweden, The Rhythm Hot Shots had learned how to Lindy Hop by watching old movies in slow motion, such as Hellzapoppin' and A Day at the Races. They would spend four hours watching a film clip on TV just to learn one or two dance steps. They trained together intensively six days a week for several hours. When Frankie Manning visited Sweden in 1987, he stayed for two weeks. At that time, Lena had left the dance company and Ewa Staremo partnered Anders. Since two members of TRHS now had first names that were pronounced the same way – Eva Lagerqvist and Ewa Staremo – Frankie nicknamed Ewa Staremo "W" to quickly differentiate the two. The members of TRHS had regular day jobs so during the first week of Frankie's visit, they met after work at around 16:00 or 17:00 and worked together for four to five hours every night. During the second week, they moved to Herräng, where the Swedish Swing Society had been holding a small dance camp, the Herräng Dance Camp, since 1982. They stayed and practiced in Folkets Hus, the community center in Herräng. During those two weeks, TRHS learned for the first time how to social dance.

In 1989, TRHS became involved with organizing the Herräng Dance Camp with the Swedish Swing Society. They invited Frankie Manning back to Sweden to teach at the dance camp, where he has returned to every year since then.

During the 1990s, TRHS achieved international fame and traveled worldwide to perform and teach at dance camps and workshops in North America, Europe, Asia, and Oceania. The Lindy Hop routine from Hellzapoppin' that they had originally learned in the early 1980s became their hallmark routine that they both performed and taught internationally.

Members of TRHS were the first international instructors to teach Lindy Hop in the former Soviet Union. On 5 April 2000, Lennart Westerlund, Catrine Lunggren, Mattias Lunmark, Åsa Palm, and Hanna Zetterman traveled to St Petersburg, Russia to help introduce Lindy Hop to 15 to 20 Russian dancers during a six-day workshop made possible by a grant from the Swedish Institute. All of the Russian dancers who attended the workshop were then awarded scholarships to attend the Herräng Dance Camp during the summer of 2000. Since then, Lindy Hop has spread to Ukraine and Lithuania.

During the late 1990s/early 2000s, several new members joined TRHS while some older members became inactive and no longer performed or taught classes, but were still members of the dance company. The 2002 Herräng Dance Camp, which TRHS owned, almost ended in bankruptcy. In autumn 2002, The Rhythm Hot Shots dance company was dissolved. The Rhythm Hot Shots Dance & Show Handelsbolag (organisationsnr 969607-7073) was unregistered and in 2004, "The Rhythm Hot Shots" trademark was transferred from The Rhythm Hot Shots Dance & Show Handelsbolag to Lennart Westerlund, Catrine Ljunggren, Eddie Jansson, Ulrika Larsdotter Ericsson, and Eva Lagerqvist Jansson.

The Harlem Hot Shots was formed by active members of TRHS in autumn 2002. Individuals who did not become members of the Harlem Hot Shots – such as Catrine Ljunggren, Eddie Jansson, Eva Lagerqvist Jansson, and Ulrika Larsdotter Ericsson – continue to teach and perform worldwide. For example, in 2006, Catrine Ljunggren helped organize the first international Lindy Hop festival in Buenos Aires, Argentina. The dance camp ran from December 1 to 3 and was so successful that it is planned to be repeated again in December 2007.

== Swedish Swing Society ==
The Swedish Swing Society (SSS) is a non-profit dance organization in Stockholm, Sweden that teaches Lindy Hop and other swing related dances. As the major swing dance society in Stockholm, most swing dancers have been a member of the SSS, and the Hot Shots are no exception. The Hot Shots and SSS have had a very close relationship from the beginning of the Hot Shots, with cross-memberships in both organizations. For example, the founders of The Rhythm Hot Shots were also members of the SSS. Almost all of the Hot Shots are either current or past members of the SSS, as well as current or past instructors for the SSS, such as Lena Ramberg, Frida Segerdahl, and Sakarias Larsson.

Some of the Hot Shots have been elected as honorary members of the SSS: Lennart Westerlund (1990-11-14), Anita Kankimäki (1993-11-27), and Anders Lind (1998-11-21). Other honorary SSS members that were important in the history of the Hot Shots include Lasse Kühler and Henning Sörensen (1998-11-21).

== Herräng Dance Camp ==
The Rhythm Hot Shots hosted the annual Herräng Dance Camp from 1989 until 2002, a dance camp in Herräng, Sweden that attracts students and teachers from all over the world. Since the 2003 dance camp, Lorenz Ilg (originator of Swing City) and members of the Harlem Hot Shots (Fatima Teffahi, Frida Segerdahl, Daniel Heedman, and Lennart Westerlund) organize and run the Herräng Dance Camp.

== Jesses Jassklubb ==
For several years The Rhythm Hot Shots and later the Harlem Hot Shots ran Jesses Jassklubb (also known as Jesses Jazzklubb, Jesses Jazz Club, Jesse's Jazz Club), a swing dance party held every Wednesday evening during the autumn and spring months. The autumn program was typically from September to early December and the spring program was from late January to late May. From 18:30 to 19:30, there was a drop-in beginner Lindy Hop dance lesson with members of TRHS/HHS and from 20:00 to 23:00 there was a swing/jazz band with DJed music between band breaks.

Jesses Jassklubb was named after its founder, Jens "Jesse" Lindgren (trombone player in Kustbandet and other bands). According to Jens Lindgren, the word "jazz" was spelled with s instead of z because originally it was spelled "jass" in New Orleans, and it helped emphasize the type of music played at the club.

For more than 11 years, Jesses Jassklubb was located at Mariahissen, Pryssgränd 14 in central Stockholm. The Mariahissen location featured a medium-sized hardwood dance floor, minimal food service, and a beautiful view of Gamla stan. On 14 April 2004 Jesses Jassklubb was held at the Mariahissen location for the last time. On 2 June 2004, Jesses Jassklubb reopened again at Hornsgatan 75, Stockholm, the current location of the Chicago Swing Dance Studio. However, the jazz club had to immediately close again since the Hornsgatan location needed additional sound insulation before another dance could be held. When the Wednesday night dances started again in autumn at a different location, the name changed to Zacke's Jazz Corner.

== Zacke's Jazz Corner ==
On 8 September 2004, the Harlem Hot Shots continued the tradition of Wednesday night swing dances at a new location: Garant festvåning, Varvsgatan 14, Stockholm with Hasse Ling and his Syncopators of Swing. This new dance location become known as Zacke's Jazz Corner and was named after Sakarias Larsson, one of the founders of the Harlem Hot Shots. When the dances were moved to Chicago Swing Dance Studio at Hornsgatan 75 on 16 February 2005, they were originally referred to as "Jesses, Zackes, Savoy, or whatever you want to call it." Zacke's Jazz Corner was the name that prevailed and is used today to refer to the Wednesday night swing dances at Chicago.

== Hornsgatan 75 ==
In March 2004, Lennart Westerlund took over the contract for Hornsgatan 75 in central Stockholm, originally the location of a movie theater by the name of Chicago (from 1907 to mid-1960s). When members of the Harlem Hot Shots took over the locale, they slowly remodeled and created a dance studio with an old-fashioned nightclub atmosphere called Chicago Swing Dance Studio. The locale is 350 m^{2} with a dance floor that is approximately 180 m^{2} and includes an office, storage area, kitchen, rest rooms, and a sitting area.

Chicago Swing Dance Studio opened in May 2004 for dance classes in Lindy Hop, tap dance, and classic jazz dance. Other dances that have also been taught include Salsa, Tango Argentino, and West African dance.

The Herräng Dance Camp office moved from Vetegatan 5 to Hornsgatan 75 in the summer of 2004.

When the HHS attempted to move Jesses Jassklubb to Hornsgatan 75 on 2 June 2004, it became apparent that additional sound insulation was needed before more dances could be held there. During the summer and autumn of 2004, the HHS increased the sound insulation, added ventilation, and redesigned the interior of the locale. Jesses Jassklubb, which had during autumn 2004 become known as Zacke's Jazz Corner, moved back to Hornsgatan 75 on 16 February 2005.

== Vintage routines ==
The following is a list of the vintage routines that the Hot Shots have performed.

Routine	Original performer(s)	Genre	Song	Movie	Year
The Three Chefs	The Three Chefs	Tap dance	Be Careful by Barry Paige	Breakfast in Rhythm (soundie)	1943
Hellzapoppin', aka California Routine	Whitey's Lindy Hoppers	Lindy Hop	Jumpin' at the Woodside by Count Basie	Hellzapoppin'	1941
One Man Dance	Five Blazers, aka Five Hot Shots	Tap dance	Black Beauty by Duke Ellington	Black and Tan Fantasy	1929
?	Fredi Washington	1920s Charleston	Cotton Club Stomp by Duke Ellington	Black and Tan Fantasy	1929

(incomplete)

== Competition results ==
The Hot Shots seldom enter dance competitions as their primary objective is dance performances. On occasion, members of the group compete, sometimes with partners that are not members of the Hots Shots. Some members act as judges at Lindy Hop competitions and thus do not compete.

Date	Location	Competition	Results
2007-10-25 to 2007-10-28	Stamford, Connecticut		1st: Frida Segerdahl & Skye Humphries (Classic Division); 2nd: Frida Segerdahl & Todd Yannacone (Cats' Corner)
2007-09-27 to 2007-09-30	St. Paul, Minnesota		2nd: Frida Segerdahl & Sakarias Larsson (Liberation / Fast); 3rd: Hannah Zetterman & Mattias Lundmark (Liberation / Fast); 1st: Frida Segerdahl & Skye Humphries (Revolution / Mid Tempo); 2nd: Ramona Staffeld & Sakarias Larsson (Revolution / Mid Tempo); 2nd: Frida Segerdahl & Skye Humphries (Freedom / Slow); 3rd: Frida Segerdahl & Todd Yannacone (Freedom / Slow); 1st: Frida Segerdahl & Skye Humphries (Couples Showcase / Performance); 1st: Frida Segerdahl & Andy Reid (Jack n' Jill)
2007-08-05	Stockholm, Sweden		Winner: Sakarias Larsson (The Jazz Dancer, authentic jazz dance contest)
2006-11-23 to 2006-11-26	Anaheim, California		1st: Frida Segerdahl & Skye Humphries (Lindy Showcase)
2006-10-13 to 2006-10-15	Stamford, Connecticut		1st: Frida Segerdahl & Skye Humphries (Classic Division); 1st: Frida Segerdahl & Skye Humphries (Champions' Jack & Jill); 1st: Frida Segerdahl & Skye Humphries (Cats' Corner)
2006-09-14 to 2006-09-17	St. Paul, Minnesota		2nd: Frida Segerdahl & Todd Yannacone (Liberation / Fast); 1st: Frida Segerdahl & Skye Humphries (Revolution / Mid Tempo); 1st: Frida Segerdahl & Todd Yannacone (Freedom / Slow); 1st: Frida Segerdahl & Skye Humphries (Lindy Hop Performance); 1st: Frida Segerdahl & Peter Strom (Jack n' Jill); Dancers Choice Award: Frida Segerdahl & Skye Humphries (Favorite Competitors)
2006-07-30	Stockholm, Sweden		Winner: Åsa Palm & Daniel Heedman; Finalists: Hanna Zetterman & Mattias Lundmark, Frida Segerdahl & Sakarias Larsson
2005-10-20 to 2005-10-23	Stamford, Connecticut		1st: Frida Segerdahl & Skye Humphries (Classic Division)
2005-09-16 to 2005-09-18	St. Paul, Minnesota		2nd: Frida Segerdahl & Skye Humphries (Mid Tempo); 2nd: Frida Segerdahl & Peter Loggins (Invitational Forum / Jack & Jill); 1st: Frida Segerdahl (Charleston Battle); Dancers Choice Award: Frida Segerdahl & Skye Humphries (Most Memorable Performers)
2004-10-08 to 2004-10-09	New York City, New York		Finalists: Hanna Zetterman & Mattias Lundmark, Frida Segerdahl & Sakarias Larsson
2004-09-24 to 2004-09-26	St. Paul, Minnesota		1st: Frida Segerdahl & Jai Latimer (Champions Jack & Jill); 1st: Frida Segerdahl (Charleston Battle)
2003-08-14 to 2003-08-17	St. Paul, Minnesota		1st: Frida Segerdahl & Skye Humphries (Power to the People); 2nd: Frida Segerdahl & Ben Furnas (Power to the People); 1st: Frida Segerdahl (Charleston Battle)
2003-06-14	New York City, New York	Harlem Jazz Dance Festival's Hellzapoppin'	Finalists: Hanna Zetterman & Mattias Lundmark, Frida Segerdahl & Sakarias Larsson, Johanna Müller & Daniel Heedman
2002-08-09	Stockholm, Sweden		17th: Catrine Ljunggren & Elliot Donnelley
2002-05-18 to 2002-05-19	Karlstad, Sweden		2nd: Frida Segerdahl & Sakarias Larsson
1997-08-11	Stockholm, Sweden	World Lindy Hop Championship	3rd: Annika Lundmark & Mattias Lundmark
1997-04-05	Kista, Sweden	Al Minns Cup	3rd: Annika Lundmark & Mattias Lundmark (Lindy Hop Adult B)
1996	Sweden	Swedish Championship Lindy Hop	1st: Åsa Rickardsson & David Dalmo
1995	Oslo, Norway	World Lindy Hop Championship	1st: Anna Sandesjö & David Dalmo
1995	Sweden	Swedish Championship Lindy Hop	1st: Åsa Rickardsson & David Dalmo
1993	Sweden	Swedish Championship Lindy Hop	1st: Åsa Rickardsson & David Dalmo

(Incomplete)

== Credits ==
=== Musicals and theatrical productions ===
Date	Dance Co.	Production	Location
2005-11-27	HHS	Blue House Jazz with Jan Lundgren Trio & Andreas Pettersson Quartet	Konserthuset, Stockholm, Sweden
2005-11-24 to 2005-11-30	HHS	Children's Shows: The dance that disappeared	Rosenlundsteatern, Stockholm, Sweden
2005-11-06	TRHS & HHS	20 Years with the Hot Shots	Södra Teatern, Stockholm, Sweden
2005-03-16 to 2005-03-17	HHS	S.W.I.N.G - stratospheric dance show from the days of guys and dolls	Rosenlundsteatern, Stockholm, Sweden
2005	HHS	Harlem en Douce France	Rosenlundsteatern, Stockholm, Sweden
2004-12-10	HHS	Gunhild Carling Varieté	Lunds Stadsteater, Lund, Sweden
2004-12-04	HHS	A Spectacular Concert by Swing That Music with Harlem Hot Shots	Dieselverkstaden, Stockholm, Sweden
2004	HHS	Hollywood Goes Black and Tan	Sweden tour
2004-05	HHS	Jazz Dance - den sanna historien	Chicago Swing Dance Studio, Stockholm, Sweden
2003-05-02 to 2003-06-16	HHS	Spirit of Swing	USA/Canada tour
2003	HHS	Swing Is the Thing	Sweden tour
2003-04	HHS	Black Beauty	Konserthuset, Stockholm, Sweden
2002-11	TRHS	The Great Swing Party	Sweden tour
2002	TRHS	Swing Time	Nalen, Stockholm, Sweden
2000	TRHS	What Is This Thing Called Swing?	Nalen, Stockholm, Sweden USA tour
1999	TRHS	Swing	Teater Replica, Stockholm, Sweden
1998	TRHS	Hep to the Jive	Komediteatern, Stockholm, Sweden
1996	TRHS	Jumpin' at the Jubilee	Södra Teatern, Stockholm, Sweden
1994	TRHS	Hello Dolly	Skandiateatern, Norrköping, Sweden
1993	TRHS	Jublar Anamma	Skandiateatern, Norrköping, Sweden
1990	TRHS	Come to Broadway	Södra Teatern, Stockholm, Sweden

(Incomplete)

=== Other performances ===
Date	Dance Co.	Production	Location
2004	HHS	Herräng Swing Bus	Europe tour
2003-01	HHS	Bugle Call Rag	Century Ballroom, Seattle, Washington
2002	TRHS	Herräng Swing Bus	Europe tour
2001	TRHS	Herräng Swing Bus	Europe tour

(Incomplete)

=== Commercials ===
Date	Dance Co.	Organization	Commercial
1997	TRHS	KappAhl Clothes	Stepp in (tap dance in)
1996	TRHS	KappAhl Clothes	Julfilmen (the Christmas movie)
1996	TRHS	KappAhl Clothes	Candela
1991	TRHS	Arla Milk	Mjölk ger starka ben (milk gives strong bones/legs)

=== Awards ===
Date	Dance Co.	Award	Location
1996	TRHS	Winner of the Frankie Award for Everlasting Work to Preserve and Spread the African-American Dance Culture	Munich, Germany
1994	TRHS	Winners of the Feather Award for Most Outstanding Global Swing Dancers	Beverly Hills, California, United States
1992	TRHS	Winner of Amateur Night	Apollo Theater, Harlem, New York, United States

== Mass media ==
=== News and documentaries ===
Date	Dance Co.	Channel	Program	Description
2007-07-02 07:45	HHS	SVT1	Gomorron Sverige	"Lindy Hop i studion med Lindy Hop-dansare från världens största swingdansläger i Herräng." (Lindy Hop in the studio with Lindy Hop dancers from the world's largest swing dance camp in Herräng.) Interview and performance with Daniel Heedman & Åsa Palm. (11:20)
2007-07-01 19:30	HHS	SVT1	Rapport	"Dansfestival i Herräng i fem veckor." (Five week dance festival in Herräng.) Herräng Dance Camp celebrates 25 years. Interview with Lennart Westerland plus dancers from around the world. Reporter: Therese Andersson. (2:30)
2006-07-22 08:59	HHS	TV4	Nyhetsmorgon lördag	"Lindy Hop-läger lockar folk från hela världen." (Lindy Hop camp attracts people from the entire world.) Interview with dancers from around the world at the Herräng Dance Camp.
2005-07-03 21:00; 2005-12-31 17:00 (rerun)	HHS	SVT1, SVT Europa		Documentary of the Herräng Dance Camp by Svante Grundberg and Jan M. Forsell. Features Frankie Manning, Fayard Nicholas, Sugar Sullivan, Dawn Hampton, Chazz Young, Steven Mitchell, Chester Whitmore and the Harlem Hot Shots. (60:00)

(Incomplete)

=== Articles ===
Date	Dance Co.	Newspaper	Title	Author	Description
2006-03-30	HHS	Arbetarbladet		Catharina Nilsson	Mattias Lundmark and Jenny Deurell from Stockholm are in Tierp to teach 4th and 5th graders to dance Lindy Hop.

(Incomplete)

== Trivia ==
- Hanna Zetterman grew up in Herräng, the home of the Herräng Dance Camp. One year she decided to find out why so many strange people invaded her home town each summer for the dance camp. She has continued to dance since that time.
- Fatima Teffahi is the first member of the Hot Shots whose specialty, tap dance, is not a partner dance.
- The tallest member of the Harlem Hot Shots, Sakarias Larsson (188 cm), dances with the shortest member, Frida Segerdahl.
- In 2005, Sakarias Larsson and Hanna Zetterman were chosen to appear in the first run of Floor Filler, a Swedish reality TV show with dancers competing to be Sweden's most popular dancer. Mattias Lundmark also auditioned but was not chosen as one of the final 24 contestants. Hanna decided to drop out of the show before the first program since the contestants were required to live in a building in downtown Stockholm 24/7 and she instead preferred to continue her education. Sakarias remained in the program for a little longer than four weeks before being eliminated.
- For the 2005 Floor Filler TV show, the competition was judged by the BouncE Streetdance Company, a dance group formed by David Dalmo and other dancers in 1997. Lindy Hop was the second dance featured on Floor Filler and was taught by David Dalmo and Åsa Rickardsson. Not surprisingly, Sakarias and his partner won the Lindy Hop competition and gained immunity from being eliminated from the show that week.
- Members of the Harlem Hot Shots (Frida Segerdahl, Sakarias Larsson, Hanna Zetterman, Mattias Lundmark, Åsa Palm, Daniel Heedman) appeared in the finals of Talang 2007, a Swedish televised talent contest. They revealed during the final episode of Talang 2007 that Hanna and Mattias plus Åsa and Daniel were couples.

== See also ==
- Herräng Dance Camp
