= Willa Mae Ricker =

American Lindy Hop and jazz dancer

- Born: Willa Mae Briggs; April 7, 1910
- Died: June 1, 1978 (aged 68)
- Occupation: Dancer

Willa Mae Ricker (née Briggs; April 7, 1910 – June 1978) was a prominent American Lindy Hop and jazz dancer and performer during the 1930s and 1940s with the Harlem-based Whitey's Lindy Hoppers. She was known for her physical strength, fashion sense, dependability, business acumen, and passion to dance. According to Norma Miller, Ricker was the first dancer to stand up to Herbert "Whitey" White, demanding fair pay.

Willa Mae Ricker began swing dancing in the Savoy Ballroom with longtime friend Frankie Manning, whom she regularly partnered with. Shortly after Herbert "Whitey" White created Whitey's Lindy Hoppers, she was asked to be a part of the second tier of the group, along with Norma Miller, Leon James, Ella Gibson and Snookie Beasley. Throughout her career Willa Mae partnered with Frankie Manning, Snookie Beasley, Leon James, Al Minns, Russel Williams and others. Frankie Manning has said "She was one of the greats of Lindy Hop... she was the soul and heart of the dance". He specifically notes her skill in doing all of the aerials, and her physical strength "to hold men up so they could shine".

In the late 1930s, Willa Mae married her high school sweetheart, and fellow Whitey's Lindy Hopper, Billy Ricker. The couple rarely danced together professionally and remained together happily for the rest of their lives.

Over Willa Mae careers she had been featured in many films. She was featured in A Day at the Races (1937), Hellzapoppin' (1941), Hot Chocolates (1941), Killer Diller (1948), and The Spirit Moves (1950). In 1943, She and partner Leon James were featured in a photo essay in the August 23 issue of Life, demonstrating aerials.

During World War II, Ricker managed the Harlem Congaroos, a sub-group of Whitey's Lindy Hoppers formed from the premiere dancers. When Frankie Manning returned from the Pacific in 1947, he took over as management and Willa Mae continued dancing in the group, which then became known as the Congaroo Dancers. During one of the groups annual summer-long gigs at the Club Harlem in Atlantic City, Willa Mae had to have an emergency hysterectomy. Helen Daniels replaced her in the show until she was able to rebuild her muscle and stamina. After the Congaroos broke up in the late fifties, Ricker took on a career as a fashion model. As she had always been a fashionable dancer with a good sense of business, she was able to make her second career in fashion.

Willa Mae died in June 1978 of cancer. Sources differ on her year of death, with a number of sources listing the 1960s and others 1978. She had a long career as a dancer alongside her husband and continued performing throughout her life. She was noted as a member of the Lindy Hop dance community.

== Filmography ==
- A Day at the Races (1937)
- Hellzapoppin' (1941)
- Hot Chocolates (1941)
- Killer Diller (1948)
- The Spirit Moves (1950)
