= Al & Leon =

American Lindy Hop and jazz dance duo

Al & Leon were a prominent American Lindy Hop and jazz dance duo. The two members were Al Minns and Leon James. They were most famous for their film and stage performances in the 1930s and 1940s both on their own, and as part of the Harlem-based Whitey's Lindy Hoppers. They appeared in the Marx Brothers film A Day at the Races. They also appeared on US television programs in the 1950s and 1960s, highlighting the jazz dances they and their cohorts helped to pioneer at the Savoy Ballroom in New York, as well as working throughout their lives to promote the dances to new generations.

== Filmography ==
- Jazz Dance (1954)
- TV appearance: The DuPont Show of the Week: Chicago and All That Jazz (1961)
