= Stroll =

Stroll may refer to:

- A walk
- A daycation

== Dance ==
- The Stroll, 1950s dance
- Jitterbug Stroll, 1990s swing-line dance
- Charleston Stroll, 2010s swing-line dance

== People ==
- Avrum Stroll (1921–2013), American research professor
- Edson Stroll (1929–2011), American actor
- Lance Stroll (born 1998), Canadian Formula One driver
- Lawrence Stroll (born 1959), Canadian businessman

== Films ==
- The Stroll (2003 film) (Russian: Прогулка; 'Progulka'), Russian drama film
- The Stroll (2023 film), documentary about trans sex workers in New York City

== Other uses ==
- "The Stroll" (song), 1957 song by The Diamonds
- Stroll (album), 2013 album by Big D and the Kids Table

== See also ==
- Esplanade
