= Carolina Norén =

Swedish radio presenter

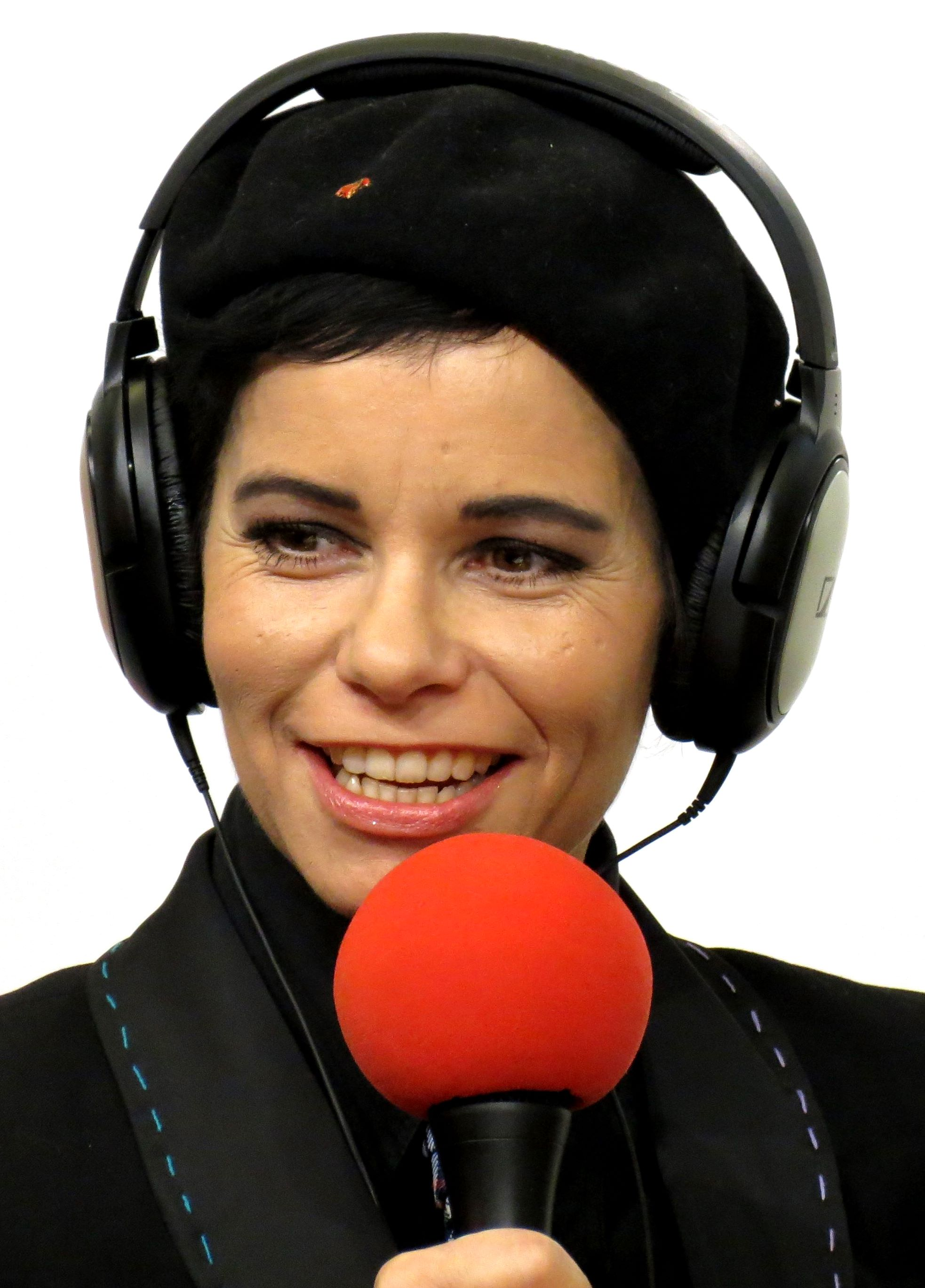
- Norén in 2013
- Born: Krång Anna Carolina Norén; 29 January 1965 (age 61); Stockholm, Sweden
- Occupation: Radio presenter
- Known for: Svensktoppen

Krång Anna Carolina Norén (born 29 January 1965) is a Swedish radio presenter for Sveriges Radio and television presenter. She has been the host of the music chart show Svensktoppen since 2007 and also commentates on Sveriges Radio's broadcasts of Melodifestivalen and the annual Eurovision Song Contest.

== Life and career ==
She took the first steps to a radio career when she participated as an interviewer at the legendary Radio SBC in the Stockholm community radio in 1980–82. She also made some appearances at Stockholm University's student radio station, which eventually led her to being employed by Radio Stockholm through Sveriges Radio between 1989 and 1997. In 1992, she hosted the first season of the series Här är ditt kylskåp ("Here is your refrigerator"), which was broadcast on SVT.

In 1998, she moved to P4 Riks in an attempt to make the radio channel more youth-oriented. She presented, among other, the entertainment show Curry-Curry which was broadcast on Friday nights.

Since 1999, Norén has been Sveriges Radio's commentator and host for Melodifestivalen and the Eurovision Song Contests broadcasts. 2004 through 2006, Norén hosted the nostalgia program 64-93 at Sveriges Radio P4. She has also done portrait shows with guests such as Erland Josephson, Lena Nyman and Jan Guillou. In 2006 she was also host and producer for the series Let the Music Play, that played mostly disco and soul songs.

In August 2007, she succeeded Annika Jankell as the host of Svensktoppen. On 2 November 2014 Norén revealed that she had been the driving force to change the rules for the songs appearing on Svensktoppen, namely having the voting public deciding via a vote if a song should be able to stay on the chart longer than a year.

Norén currently hosts Knattetimmen on Sveriges Radio P4.

Norén lives in Herräng near Norrtälje.
