= Leon James =

Leon James may refer to:

- Leon James (composer) (born 1991), Indian film composer and singer
- Leon James (dancer) (died 1970), American Lindy Hop and jazz dancer
- Leon James (footballer) (born 2001), Thai footballer
