= Jitterbug (disambiguation) =

A jitterbug is a swing dancer, any of various types of swing dances, or the act of dancing to swing music.

Jitterbug may also refer to:

- "The Jitterbug", a song cut from the Wizard of Oz soundtrack
- Jitterbugs, a film
- Jitterbug Perfume, a novel by Tom Robbins
- Jitterbug Wireless, a mobile phone company
- Diddley bow, a musical instrument
- "Jitterbug", a song by Ellegarden
- "Jitterbuggin'", a song by Heatwave from Candles
- "Jitterbug (Junior Is A)", a song by Cardiacs from Guns
- "JitterBug", a free software web based (software) bug tracking system
- "Wake Me Up Before You Go-Go", a song by Wham! which uses the spoken-word inserted throughout.
- Jitterbug transformation, a term coined by Buckminster Fuller for the chiral transformations of the cuboctahedron

== See also ==
- Cajun Jitterbug, a style of dancing
- Jitterbug Stroll, a dance
