= Charleston Stroll =

Swing line dance

The Charleston Stroll is a swing line dance choreographed by Sing Lim from Singapore to the song Put A Lid On It by the Squirrel Nut Zippers. It can be found danced in many swing scenes all over the world.

Other strolls: Jitterbug Stroll, Shim Sham.
