= Herräng Dance Camp =

International annual dance camp in Herräng, Sweden

Herrang Dance Camp
- Frequency: Annual
- Venue: Herräng
- Location: Herräng
- Country: Sweden
- Years active: 44
- Inaugurated: 1982; 44 years ago
- Major events: Swing dance
- Website: www.herrang.com

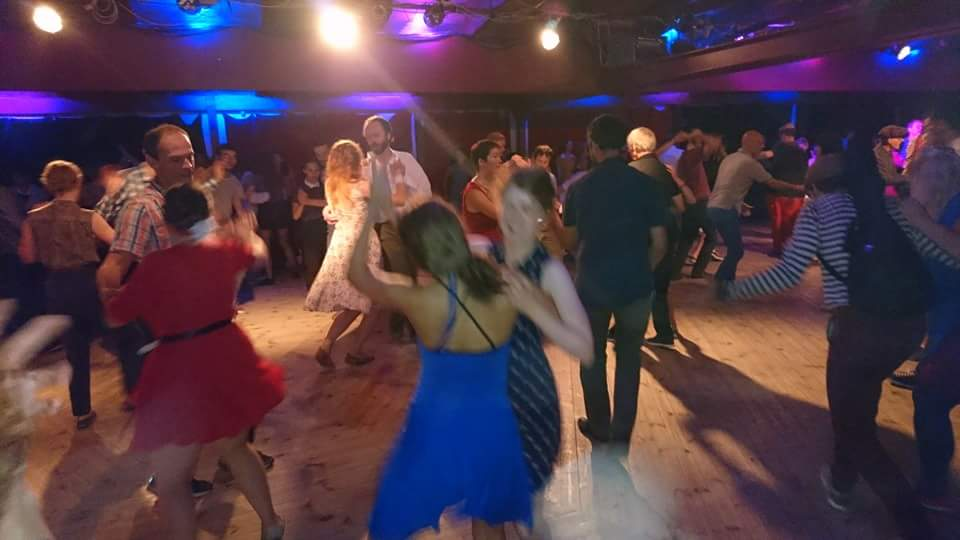
Social dancing in Herräng Folkets Hus during Herräng Dance Camp 2016.

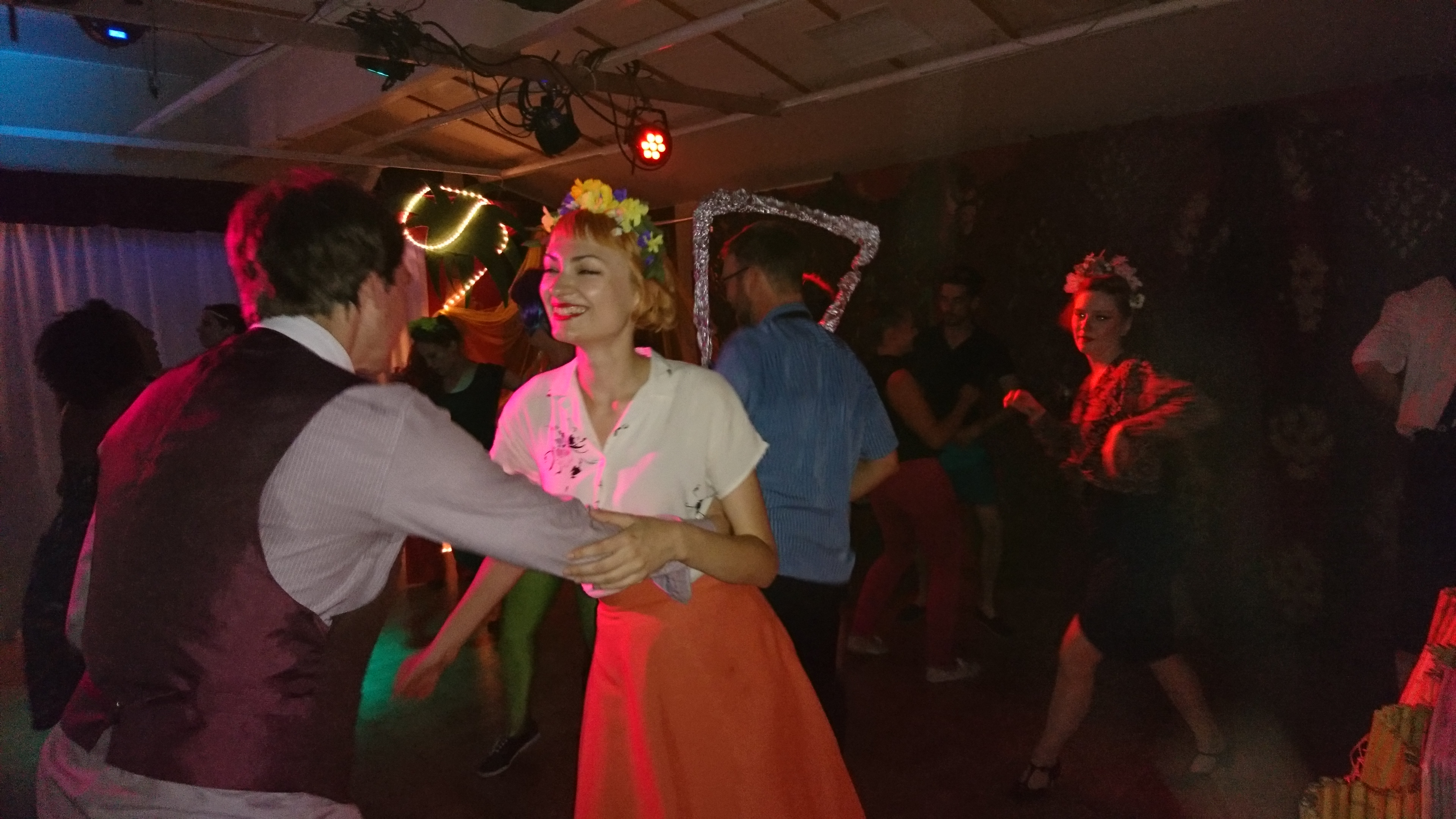
Social dancing in Herräng 2016.

Herräng Dance Camp (commonly abbreviated HDC, officially Herräng Dance Camp Aktiebolag) is the largest annual dance camp that focuses on lindy hop, boogie woogie, tap dance, jazz dance, and balboa. It is held annually in July in Herräng, Sweden, and focuses both on instruction and dancing.

Swing era dancers that have presented at the camp include Al Minns, Frankie Manning, Norma Miller, Chazz Young, and Dawn Hampton.

In preparation for the camp, infrastructure is added to the village to accommodate the dancers. This includes several cafés; a full cafeteria serving buffet-style meals; a shop for dance supplies, accessories and daily essentials; bicycle rental; housing of various standards; and nightly entertainment.

== History ==
The first Herräng Dance Camp was held for one week, starting on 1 August 1982, and was organized by the Swedish Swing Society, a swing dance organization based in Stockholm, Sweden. It was attended by around 25 participants and was entirely taught by John Clancy from New York. Attendance increased to nearly 100 students in its second year. For the following five years, the camp grew in popularity in and around Sweden, and was only attended by Swedish dancers. It eventually gained an international following. Frankie Manning attended the camp for the first time in 1989.
