= Chazz Young =

American choreographer and tap dance teacher

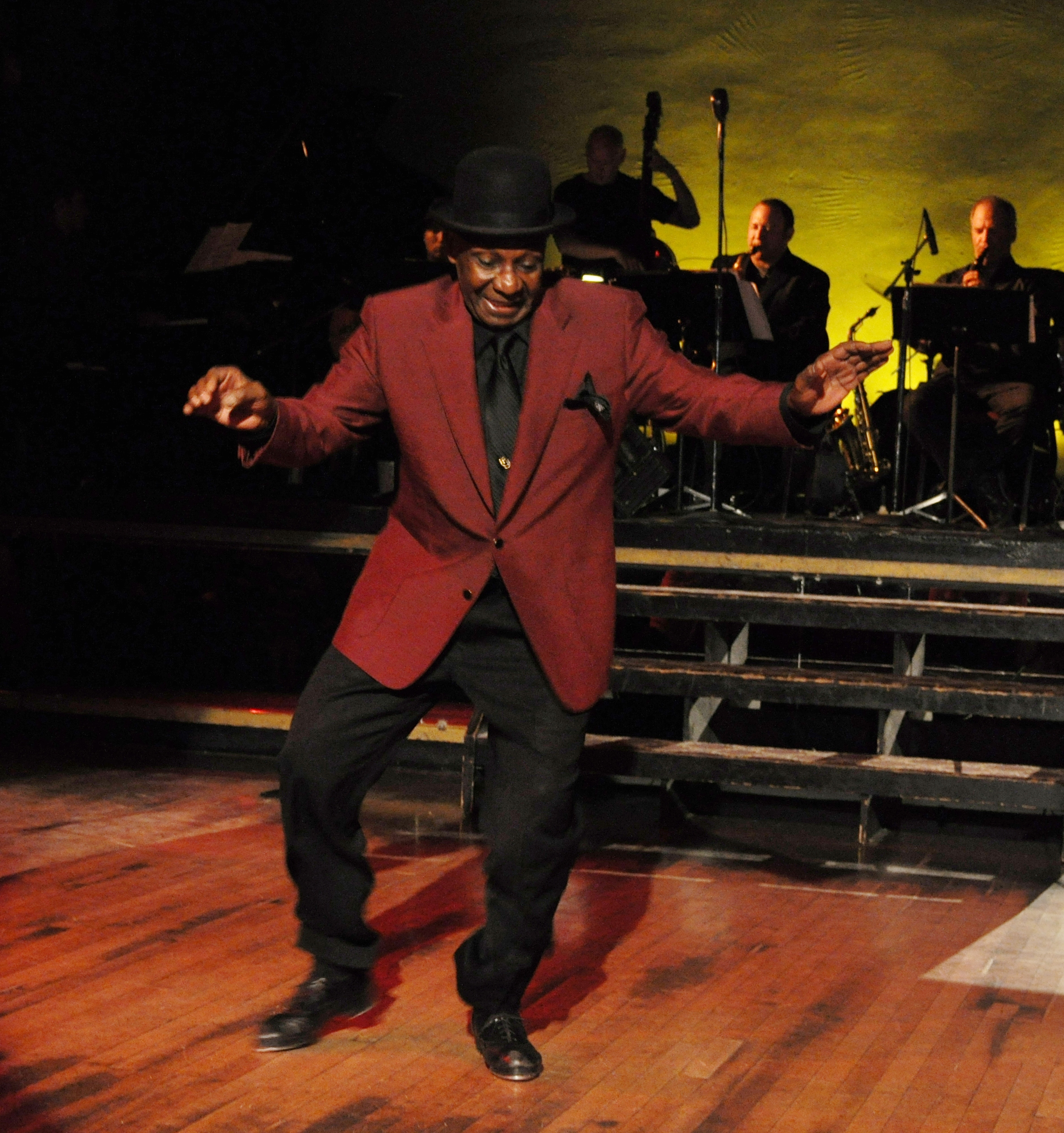
- Young at Masters of Lindy Hop and Tap, Century Ballroom, Seattle, Washington, 14 August 2009
- Born: Charles Young; November 8, 1932 (age 93); United States
- Occupations: Choreographer; Dancer
- Spouse: Rheda
- Parent: Frankie Manning

Charles "Chazz" Young (born November 8, 1932) is an American choreographer and teacher of tap dance.

== Early life and education ==
Young was born to father Frankie Manning, a dancer during the swing era, and mother Dorothy Young.

In 1943, at the age of 11, he saw his father, who was a member of Whitey's Lindy Hoppers, perform for the first time.

Young would practice dancing in the hallways during the lunch hour at school, while waiting for the train, and on the marble stoops.

He learned tap dancing at the Mary Bruce School in Harlem, which is where he met his wife, Rheda.

In 1956, he graduated from the New York School for the Performing Arts.

== Career ==
After graduating in 1956, Young and his wife joined Norma Miller and Her Jazzmen, formed by Norma Miller. Young was a member of the group for 14 years.

Young temporarily stopped dancing professionally after rock and roll became popular and clubs stopped hiring him. From the late 1960s through 1994, Young worked in a post office.

In 1992, Young was a dance assistant in Spike Lee's film Malcolm X.

Young has presented at Herräng Dance Camp and has taught at GNSH - Goodnight Sweetheart in the UK (2006 - 2013) and in Malaysia.

=== Documentary appearances ===
Year	Documentary
2005	Swing Invasion
2010	Frankie Manning: Ambassador of the Lindy Hop
2016	Alive and Kicking
