= Leonard Reed =

American tap dancer

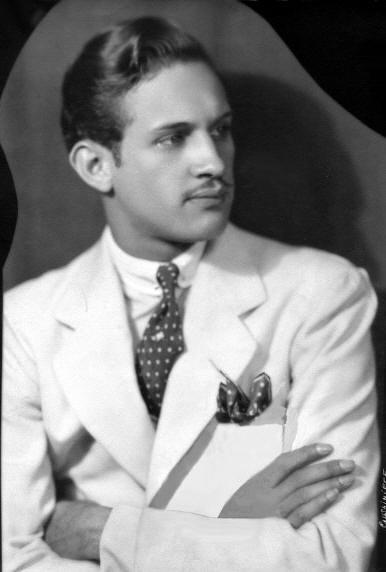
- Born: January 7, 1907; Lightning Creek, Oklahoma, U.S.
- Died: April 5, 2004 (aged 97); West Covina, California, U.S.
- Education: Cornell University
- Occupations: Dancer; producer; songwriter; comedian; MC
- Years active: 1922–2004
- Awards: Lifetime Achievement Award (American Music Awards, 2000); Honorary Doctorate (Oklahoma City University 2002)
- Career
- Dances: Shim Sham (Shim Sham Shimmy)

Leonard Reed (January 7, 1907 in Lightning Creek, Oklahoma – April 5, 2004 in West Covina, California) was an American tap dancer, co-creator with his partner, Willie Bryant, of the famous Shim Sham Shimmy (Goofus) tap dance routine.

== Early life and career ==
Born in Lightning Creek, Oklahoma, Reed was a mix of black, white and Choctaw. His mother died of pneumonia when he was two, and he never knew his father. He was raised by his great-grandmother until he was 11, when he was placed in a foster home in Kansas City, Missouri.

Leonard was habitually assaulted by the guardian of the foster home and at the age of 13 was threatened with a four-year stretch in reform school for buying alcohol under-age. The headmaster of his high school, Hugh Oliver Cook, who was aware of the abuse, offered to adopt him if he were not jailed.

By aged 15, Leonard had a weekend job selling popcorn at a theater in Kansas City. The Charleston dance craze was sweeping the United States, and he learned how to dance it by copying the performers on stage. Soon Reed was good enough to win local Charleston contests and spent the summer of 1922 as the barker for a black "tent show", or traveling revue. He began to work for the likes of Travis Tucker in his holidays and then, at aged 18, while in New York visiting his prospective university, Cornell, entered and won a Charleston competition for whites. The victory proved to be his passport to the white theaters as well. He attended Cornell University, but after winning another Charleston contest on a bet, he left school to start his dancing career.

He began in entertainment as a specialist Charleston dancer, doing three-minute slots in the shows that toured the black theater circuits of the South and Mid-West. He learned to tap by watching other performers, and while appearing in a revue called "Hits and Bits" in 1922, he was forced to parade his new skills when its star, Travis Tucker, was found to be too drunk to appear. Reed was 15. Soon he was a regular visitor to the Hoofers Club, on 7th Avenue in Harlem, where dancers such as Bill Robinson traded steps and styles with all- comers. Reed started working for the Whitman Sisters, who were acknowledged to have the best black revue, and formed a partnership with the similarly light-skinned Willie Bryant: "Reed & Bryant - Brains as well as Feet".

== Shim Sham Shimmy ==
In about 1930, Reed and Bryant devised a new finale for their eight-minute show, a step of simple heel-and-toe combinations danced to four eight-bar choruses, from tunes such as "Tuxedo Junction" and "Ain't What You Do". He and Bryant originally called the routine "Goofus", but it became known as the Shim Sham, named after a club where they regularly appeared. Its simplicity, and suitability as a line dance, especially with the newly popular swing music, meant that it was quickly picked up and disseminated by clubgoers. It has endured ever since, and has been called the anthem of tap.

== Producer career ==
In 1934 he and Bryant broke up, and at the age of 26 Reed became a producer, working in Chicago, Los Angeles and New York with some of the era's best-known black performers. He staged shows at the famed Cotton Club and later managed the Apollo Theater, where he also served as master of ceremonies for 20 years. He also developed his talents as a songwriter, arranger, bandleader and comedian. "Dancing has been my only love", he said in a Fort Worth Star-Telegram interview, adding, "But I didn't let dancing stop me from doing other things. I have the ability to be multitalented." In 1937, he was injured in a car accident and so was unfit for service during the Second World War, which he spent entertaining troops.

== Post war and later years ==
Leonard was an avid golfer and played many all-white courses in the 1940s. After years of passing as white and enduring racial slurs and insults, he decided to do something that currently affects every citizen of the US: he appeared before The Supreme Court of the United States to have the racial designation removed from the driving license. He is famous for having been the "white" manager at the Apollo Theatre who told Buddy Holly that the black audience would boo him off stage; they did not, they embraced his music. Movies depicting that scene have white actors play his role.

Leonard emceed and performed in 1944 for the "all-colored" musical, Sweet 'N Hot at the Mayan Theatre in Los Angeles. He eventually replaced Arthur Silver as director. Cast headliners included Dorothy Dandridge, Mabel Scott, Olivetti Miller, Freddie Gordon, Bob Parrish, Miller and Lee and other performers. The show went on for 11 weeks and was to go on tour "as Greatest Negro All Star Musical to Hit Coast”. Leon Hefflin, Sr. and Curtis Mosby financed the musical.

The 1960s found him working for record companies, producing acts, choreographing dance numbers, and helping to launch the career of singer Dinah Washington. He also wrote songs and taught dance in his Hollywood dance studio and in master classes across the country. He received a Lifetime Achievement Award from the American Music Awards in 2000, and two years later received an honorary Doctorate of Performing Arts degree from Oklahoma City University. At that time, he told The Sunday Oklahoman that his long, active life could be credited to "women, golf and show business ... but not necessarily in that order".

Leonard spent one segment of his career as manager and onstage comedic partner to Joe Louis, the ex-heavyweight boxing champion.

He also wrote a number of songs that were recorded by various artists such as Ella Fitzgerald, Louis Armstrong, Chick Webb, and Lionel Hampton. Several of these songs have been recorded by Mora's Modern Rhythmists, including his 1935 tune, "A Viper’s Moan", as well as his 1932 hit, "It’s Over Because We’re Through", with Leonard himself singing the vocals.

Leonard Reed lived in southern California, and taught tap dancing until his late nineties. As a vocal coach, Leonard was blessed to have a student so talented that she was unopposed during the final weeks that she appeared on Star Search; this was Angela Teek, daughter of another Reed prodigy, Spanky Wilson.

He married Barbara De Costa in 1951. At aged 97, Leonard Reed died in his sleep from congestive heart failure, in a West Covina, CA hospital on the night of Monday, April 5, 2004. His remaining family members are his granddaughter Bausheba Delaney-Trenchard, great grandchildren Vincent Morrison, Alaina Trenchard, Melody Trenchard, Hailey James Trenchard, Gabriel Trenchard and Tristen Trenchard.
