= Leon James (dancer) =

- Born: April 27, 1913; New York City
- Died: July 30, 1970 (aged 57); New York City
- Occupation: Dancer

Leon James (1913–1970), was a prominent American Lindy Hop and jazz dancer. A performer during the 1930s and 1940s with the Harlem-based Whitey's Lindy Hoppers, he and his dance partner Willa Mae Ricker were featured in a photo essay in the August 23, 1943, issue of Life magazine, demonstrating air steps.

In 1935, James and Edith Matthews won the Harvest Moon Ball.

Due to poor eyesight, James was not drafted during World War II.

During the 1950s and 1960s, James partnered with Al Minns to promote the dances they helped to pioneer, appearing at dance events, in short films, and on TV.

== Filmography ==
- A Day at the Races (1937)
- Keep Punching (1939)
  - Excerpted and released as the short Jittering Jitterbugs (aka The Big Apple) in 1943
- Cootie Williams and his Orchestra (1942)
- The Spirit Moves (1950)
- Jazz Dance (1954)

== See also ==
- Al & Leon
