= Shim Sham =

Dance routine

The Shim Sham being danced in Montreal in 2022

The Shim Sham Shimmy, Shim Sham or just Sham originally is a particular tap dance routine and is regarded as tap dance's national anthem. For today's swing dancers, it is a line dance.

== History ==
In the late 1920s, when Leonard Reed and Willie Bryant were with the Whitman Sisters troupe on the T.O.B.A. circuit in Chicago, they created a tap dance routine they called "Goofus" to the tune Turkey in the Straw. The routine consisted of standard steps: eight bars each of the Double Shuffle, the Cross Over, Tack Annie (an up-and-back shuffle), and Falling Off a Log.

In early 1930s, the Shim Sham was performed on stage in Harlem at places like Connie's Inn, Dickie Wells's Shim Sham Club, the 101 Ranch, the LaFayette Theatre, and the Harlem Opera House.

At the end of many performances, all of the musicians, singers, and dancers would get together on stage and do one last routine: the Shim Sham Shimmy. Tap dancers would perform technical variations, while singers and musicians would shuffle along as they were able. For example, in 1931 flash dance act The Three Little Words would close their show at Connie's Inn with the Shim Sham, and invite everyone to join in, "and the whole club would join us, including the waiters. For awhile people were doing the Shim Sham up and down Seventh Avenue all night long," according to Joe Jones.

According to tap dancer Howard “Stretch” Johnson the word "Shim" was a contraction of the term "she-him", a reference to the fact that the female chorus line dancers at the 101 Ranch were played by men.

At the Savoy Ballroom, some lindy hoppers did the shim sham as a group line dance, without the taps. A bunch of dancers would just jump up and start doing the shim sham on the side of the ballroom, over in the corner. Although a few people might join in, most everybody else kept on dancing without paying any attention to it.

In the mid-1980s, Frankie Manning introduced the shim sham at New York Swing Dance Society dances, and he also created a special version of the shim sham for swing dancers. Frankie Manning's version of the shim sham caught on, and it's now done at swing dances worldwide.

== Variations ==
There are several variations of "shim sham" choreography. There is the choreography used by Leonard Reed and Willie Bryant, as well as a number of variations by Leonard Reed and others. Other "shim sham" choreographies include ones by Frankie Manning, Al Minns and Leon James (also called the "Savoy Shim Sham"), and Dean Collins.

The Leonard Reed Shim Shams:

- The original Shim Sham from 1927, a 32-bar chorus composed of four steps and a break
- The Freeze Chorus, circa 1930s, the original Shim Sham without the breaks
- The Joe Louis Shuffle Shim Sham, 1948, a tap-swing dance 32-bar chorus number that Leonard Reed performed with the World Heavyweight Boxing champ Joe Louis
- The Shim Sham II, 1994, a 32-bar chorus dance based on the original Shim Sham
- The Revenge of the Shim Sham, 2002, a 32-bar chorus dance, Leonard Reed's final Shim Sham, which builds upon his original four (the name was suggested by Maxwell DeMille at a performance at the Orpheum Theatre in Los Angeles).

== The dance ==
The Shim Sham is 10 phrases of choreography (each phrase lasting four 8-counts), so it does not usually take up an entire song. After the Shim Sham was over, the dancers then would exit either stage left or right, depending on what was agreed upon for that show.

Today in the Lindy Hop scene, once the Shim Sham choreography is over, dancers typically find a partner and break into lindy hop for the remainder of the song. During this portion of the song, the band or a DJ may call out "Freeze!" or "Slow!" instructing the dancers to either stop where they are or dance slowly, then call out "Dance!" to tell everyone to resume normal dancing. The Frankie Manning version repeats the basic choreography (replacing each of the break steps with an 8-beat hold), then adds two Boogie Back/Boogie Forward phrases and two Boogie Back/Shorty George phrases to the end of the second repetition of the basic choreography. Only after the final Shorty George is completed do the dancers break into freestyle Lindy Hop.

== The music ==
The Shim Sham goes best with swing songs whose melody lines start on beat eight, as does the choreography. An obvious choice is The Shim Sham Song (Bill Elliot Swing Orchestra), which was written specifically for this dance and has musical effects (e.g., breaks) in all the right places. However, today the Shim Sham — particularly the Frankie Manning version — is danced more often to "'Tain't What You Do (It's The Way That Cha Do It)" by Jimmie Lunceford and His Orchestra, or "Tuxedo Junction" by Erskine Hawkins. In fact, it is typical now at a Lindy dance party for dancers to start up a Shim Sham whenever "'Tain't What You Do" is played. There is also a recording "Stompin' at the Savoy" with the George Gee band where Manning himself calls out the moves.

== The steps ==
These are the steps of the original 32-bar Shim Sham:

=== Step 1: The shim sham/double shuffle ===
Bar	Time	Steps	Left/Right
1	8e1	stomp spank step	RRR
	2e3	stomp spank step	LLL
2	4e1e	stomp spank ball change	RRRL
	2e3	stomp spank step	RRR
3+4		repeat with sides reversed	
5+6		repeat bar 1–2, ending with:	
6	2e3	stomp spank touch	RRR

=== The break ===
Bar	Time	Steps	Left/Right
7	8 1	stamp toe	RL
	2 3&	step hop step	LLR
8	(4)a5	hop step	RL
	6 7	step step	RL

=== Step 2: Push and cross/Crossover ===
Bar	Time	Steps	Left/Right
9	8123	stamp step stamp step	RLRL
10	4 1e	step heel step (crossing in front of right foot)	RRL
	(2)e3	heel step	LR
11+12		repeat with sides reversed	
13+14		repeat bars 9+10	
15	4 1e	step heel step (crossing)	LLR
	(2)e3	heel step	RL
16		repeat bar 15 with sides reversed	

=== Step 3: Tacky Annies/Tack Annies ===
Bar	Time	Steps	Left/Right
17	e4e1	stamp stamp spank touch (crossing behind)	RLRR
	2e3	stamp spank touch (crossing behind)	RLL
18	4e1	stamp spank touch (crossing behind)	LRR
	2e3	stamp spank step (crossing behind)	RLL
19–22		repeat twice, ending with:	
22	2e3	stamp spank step	RLL
23+24		Break as before	

=== Step 4: Half breaks/Falling-off-the-log ===
Bar	Time	Steps	Left/Right
25	8 1	stamp step	RL
	e2e3	shuffle ball change	RRRL
26		repeat	
27+28		break as before	
29–32		repeat 25–28, ending the break with:	
32	(4)e1	hop step	RL
	2 3	jump out, jump in	BB
