= Hellzapoppin' (film) =

1941 American musical comedy film

- Theatrical release poster
- Directed by: H. C. Potter; Joseph A. McDonough (assistant); Eddie Cline (retakes)
- Written by: Nat Perrin; Warren Wilson; Alex Gottlieb (uncredited)
- Based on: Hellzapoppin by Olsen and Johnson
- Produced by: Alex Gottlieb; Jules Levey (uncredited); Glenn Tryon
- Starring: Ole Olsen; Chic Johnson
- Cinematography: Elwood Bredell
- Edited by: Milton Carruth; Ted J. Kent (uncredited)
- Music by: Charles Previn (musical director); Frank Skinner (musical score); Ted Cain (music supervisor); Don Raye and Gene DePaul (original songs)
- Production company: Mayfair Productions
- Distributed by: Universal Pictures
- Release dates: December 25, 1941 (Premiere); December 26, 1941
- Running time: 84 minutes
- Country: United States
- Language: English
- Box office: $1.7 million (US rentals)

Hellzapoppin' is a 1941 American musical comedy film, and an adaptation of the stage musical that ran on Broadway from 1938 to 1941. The film was directed by H. C. Potter and distributed by Universal Pictures. Although the entire Broadway cast was initially slated to feature in the film, the only performers from the stage production to appear in the film were lead actors Ole Olsen and Chic Johnson, Katherine Johnson (Mrs. Chic Johnson, as the woman perpetually yelling for "Oscar"), and the specialty act Whitey's Lindy Hoppers.

Alongside Olsen and Johnson, both of whom produced and starred in the Broadway musical, the cast of Hellzapoppin' includes Martha Raye, Hugh Herbert, Jane Frazee, Robert Paige, Mischa Auer, Shemp Howard, and the musical duo Slim & Slam. The film is deliberately nonsensical, with the comedians stopping the film to address both the movie audience and the projection booth (breaking the fourth wall); trick photography embellishing the visual gags; and the traditional romantic subplot ridiculed as it unfolds.

== Plot ==
Louie (Shemp Howard), the projectionist of the Universal Theatre, starts showing a musical pageant of chorus girls promenading down a staircase. The staircase collapses and turns into a slide, conveying the dancers straight to hell, where they are tortured by demons. Ole Olsen and Chic Johnson (playing themselves) arrive in the midst of the mayhem by taxi and after a series of pranks, step back to reveal that they are on a movie soundstage.

They are hounded by the film's director (Richard Lane), who tries to explain that their wild comedy won't work in movies. Mousy screenwriter Harry Selby (Elisha Cook, Jr.) outlines his adaptation of the play; the rest of the movie's “plot” depicts Selby's proposed script, a romance. In it, theater producer-composer Jeff Hunter (Robert Paige) wants to marry wealthy ingenue Kitty Rand (Jane Frazee), but doesn't want to interfere because her fiancé is his best friend, Woody Taylor (Lewis Howard).

Olsen and Johnson arrive at the palatial Rand estate, laden with props for an elaborate musical revue Jeff is staging as a vehicle for Kitty. Immediately dissatisfied with their revue being turned into the usual Hollywood movie, Ole and Chic spend the remainder of the film disrupting the adaptation's narrative and the central romance by any means possible. Chic's hoydenish, man-crazy sister Betty (Martha Raye) pursues Pepi (Mischa Auer), the revue's leading man and a former Russian nobleman. After a series of mishaps and adventures—including frequent run-ins with magician/detective Quimby (Hugh Herbert) and constant technical problems while the film is being projected—Jeff's revue is finally performed for a society audience. Olsen and Johnson repeatedly sabotage and undermine the revue's musical ensembles. The revue is a success anyway, and Jeff wins Kitty for a happy ending.

Screenwriter Selby finishes narrating his script, and Olsen and Johnson take their leave of the studio. The director, frustrated, shoots the screenwriter—who is uninjured and pays scant attention, but leaks like a sieve when he drinks a glass of water.

== Cast ==
- Ole Olsen as Himself
- Chic Johnson as Himself
- Martha Raye as Betty Johnson
- Hugh Herbert as Quimby
- Jane Frazee as Kitty Rand
- Robert Paige as Jeff Hunter
- Mischa Auer as Pepi
- Dick Lane as Director
- Shemp Howard as Louie, the Projectionist
- Elisha Cook Jr. as Harry Selby
- Lewis Howard as Woody Taylor
- Clarence Kolb as Andrew Rand
- Nella Walker as Mrs. Rand
- Frank Darien as Man calling for Mrs. Jones
- Katherine Johnson as Lena, lady looking for Oscar
- Gus Schilling as Orchestra Conductor
- Jody Gilbert as Shemp's Girlfriend
- Slim Gaillard and Slam Stewart as themselves, Slim and Slam
- Whitey's Lindy Hoppers (including Norma Miller as a cook and Frankie Manning) as the Harlem Congaroos, in order of appearance:

William Downes & Francis 'Mickey' Jones, Billy Ricker & Norma Miller, Al Minns & Willa Mae Ricker, Frankie Manning & Ann Johnson.

- Gil Perkins as Butler in Pool (uncredited)
- Dale Van Sickel as Frankenstein's monster (uncredited)

== Music ==
The 1942 Academy Awards nomination for Best Song of "Pig Foot Pete" (which lost to "White Christmas"), was attributed to Hellzapoppin'; however, the song never appears in the film—it was actually performed in the Abbott and Costello film Keep 'Em Flying, another Universal Pictures production from 1941.

The official Academy Awards database credits Hellzapoppin' with the Best Song nomination but comments in a note, "This nomination is a mystery. Both the nominations list and the program from the Awards dinner list the song as being from Hellzapoppin', a 1942 release for Awards purposes."

== Post-production ==
H. C. Potter directed the film and paid close attention to new camera tricks and comedy effects. As originally conceived by Potter, there wasn't any movie projectionist as played by Shemp Howard. Potter conveyed the illusion that Olsen and Johnson were speaking to the actual projectionist, personally running the picture in each individual theater, and the frequent technical problems were attributed to the unseen projectionist. Potter staged an elaborate finale, where Olsen and Johnson attend the opening of their film at Grauman's Chinese Theatre and plant their footprints in the movie palace's famous celebrity courtyard. Unfortunately for Ole and Chic, the wet cement acts like quicksand and sinks the comedians underground as the end title appears.

Universal executives thought audiences might be confused by some of Potter's scenes. Potter was no longer on the lot, so producer Alex Gottlieb assigned director Eddie Cline to shoot new scenes with Shemp Howard as the new, fictitious projectionist; Jody Gilbert as Shemp's girlfriend; Richard Lane; and Elisha Cook, Jr. Olsen and Johnson were not present for the retakes. Film editor Milton Carruth inserted a quick clip of Olsen and Johnson into the new ending, which has director Richard Lane expressing his disgust with the script and shooting Elisha Cook, Jr., repeatedly. Cook is uninjured ("I always wear a bulletproof vest around the studio"), but when he drinks a glass of water, the liquid bursts from his chest. H. C. Potter was upset when he saw the finished film: "A lot of things that I had worked very hard on -- innovations -- were, after I had left Universal, gone completely. I screamed and yelled bloody hell, but there was nothing I could do about it."

== Reception ==
Some reviewers had been skeptical that Hellzapoppin' would work as a motion picture, and were surprised that the film version was every bit as funny. Film Bulletin commented, "It did not seem possible that the type of hilarity which went into the making of the legitimate show could be transplanted successfully to the screen. Yet here it is for all to see... [The gags are] plenty good and stack up as ace high comedy material." Motion Picture Reviews was both amused and amazed: "It follows no known formula, and its noisy, spectacular, and hilarious progress is like nothing ever seen on the screen before." The reviewer for The Sydney Morning Herald wrote, in August 1942: "Sections of its extraordinary pattern materialise with uproarious unexpectedness, while hilarious development of some ridiculously funny incident adds to the farcical, burlesque, and slapstick appeal of a production astounding in its originality and verve. It has to be seen to be believed. If there is nothing memorable to take away after the show it is at any rate enjoyable while it lasts." In Time in 1942, critic James Agee wrote, "On celluloid Hellzapoppin' loses the frenetic quality it achieved on the stage ... some skits succeed, more fail. But Olsen and Johnson's ability to exude a kind of ectoplasm which engulfs the audience and makes it participate in the show is necessarily cut off when the show is confined to the screen ... Stripped of its unsurpassable insanity, the name for it is ham vaudeville."

Hellzapoppin' had its premiere at the Rivoli Theatre in New York City on Christmas Day, 1941. The first performance at 10 a.m. was for 2,000 orphans and a further showing was held at 2 p.m. for 2,000 soldiers and sailors, with the official premiere in the evening. The Rivoli run was relatively short, indicating a flop, but columnist Gilbert Fraunhar explained that the Rivoli was near the Winter Garden Theatre: "Hundreds of thousands of New Yorkers passing the Rivoli were deceived into thinking that they were passing the Winter Garden... Many of them had seen the play, and therefore passed up a theatre where they thought it was still playing."

The Rivoli engagement notwithstanding, Hellzapoppin' became a smash hit. Universal's top box office attraction at the time was Abbott and Costello; Hellzapoppin' exceeded even those returns. "Universal executives admit that the picture is outgrossing the Abbott and Costello films. And when a Universal exec makes an admission like that, the picture has to be doing terrific business," reported Fraunhar. "More specifically, Hellzapoppin', in the bunch of openings it has had to date, has outgrossed every A & C, we are told, except Keep 'Em Flying, which had the benefit of Thanksgiving week openings. And as time rolls on... "Hellz" promises to outdo its only A & C rival."

== Aftermath ==
Realart Pictures reissued Hellzapoppin' to theaters in 1948. In 1956 Screen Gems, then Universal's television distributor, syndicated it to broadcasting stations. MCA, Universal's next TV distributor, withdrew Hellzapoppin' in 1968 after theatrical producer Alexander H. Cohen purchased the rights to Hellzapoppin from the Olsen & Johnson estate. Universal/16, the studio's film-rental agency, likewise withdrew all 16mm prints from its library.

Cohen did mount revivals of Hellzapoppin for television (1972) and the stage (1977).

Malcolm McLaren in his song "Waltz Darling" refers to the film in the chorus.
