= Al Minns =

American dancer (1920–1985)

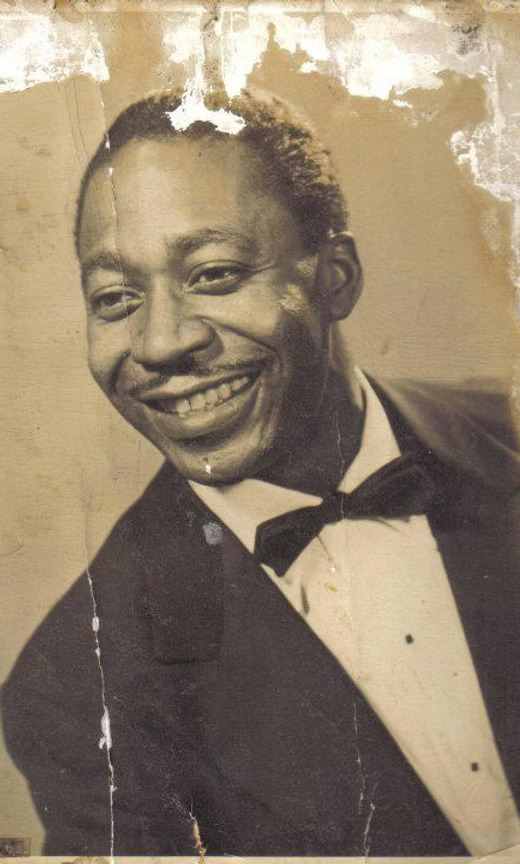
- Albert "Al" Minns
- Born: 1 January 1920
- Died: 24 April 1985 (aged 65)

Al Minns (1 January 1920 – 24 April 1985), was a prominent American Lindy Hop and jazz dancer. Most famous for his film and stage performances in the 1930s and 1940s with the Harlem-based Whitey's Lindy Hoppers, Minns worked throughout his life to promote the dances that he and his cohorts helped to pioneer at New York's Savoy Ballroom. In 1938, Al Minns and Sandra Gibson (see Mildred Pollard) won the Harvest Moon Ball.

== The Resurgence of Lindy Hop ==
In 1981, Al Minns was rediscovered by Sandra Cameron and Larry Schulz during a Louise "Mama Lou" Parks event. They invited him to teach at Sandra's dance studio, the Sandra Cameron Dance Center (SCDC). Another instrumental figure was Paul Grecki, who also worked with Al and later with Frankie Manning at the studio.

Sandra and Larry, collaborated with the legendary Norma Miller in 1984 to create "A Night at the Savoy: A Salute to Swing," a jazz extravaganza at the Village Gate. This sensational show brought together Lindy Hop veterans such as Billy Ricker, Al Minns, and Frankie Manning, reigniting their passion and sparking a new wave of enthusiasm for the dance. Schulz also played a vital role in managing Al Minns and Sugar Sullivan, promoting Lindy Hop in NYC when the scene was virtually nonexistent.

In 1984, three members of The Rhythm Hot Shots from Sweden, namely Lennart Westerlund, Anders Lind, and Henning Sorenson, embarked on a journey to New York. Their purpose was to seek out original Lindy Hoppers and specifically learn from Al Minns, who happened to be teaching at SCDC during one of the Saturday afternoon dance classes. They brought Al Minns to Stockholm in 1984. Later, in 1986, they brought Frankie Manning and other original Savoy Ballroom dancers to Herräng Dance Camp, contributing to the spread of Lindy Hop's revival worldwide.

== Filmography ==
- Hellzapoppin' (1941)
- Hot Chocolates (1941)
- The Spirit Moves (1950)
- Jazz Dance (1954)

== See also ==
- Al & Leon
