= Whitey's Lindy Hoppers =

American dance troupe

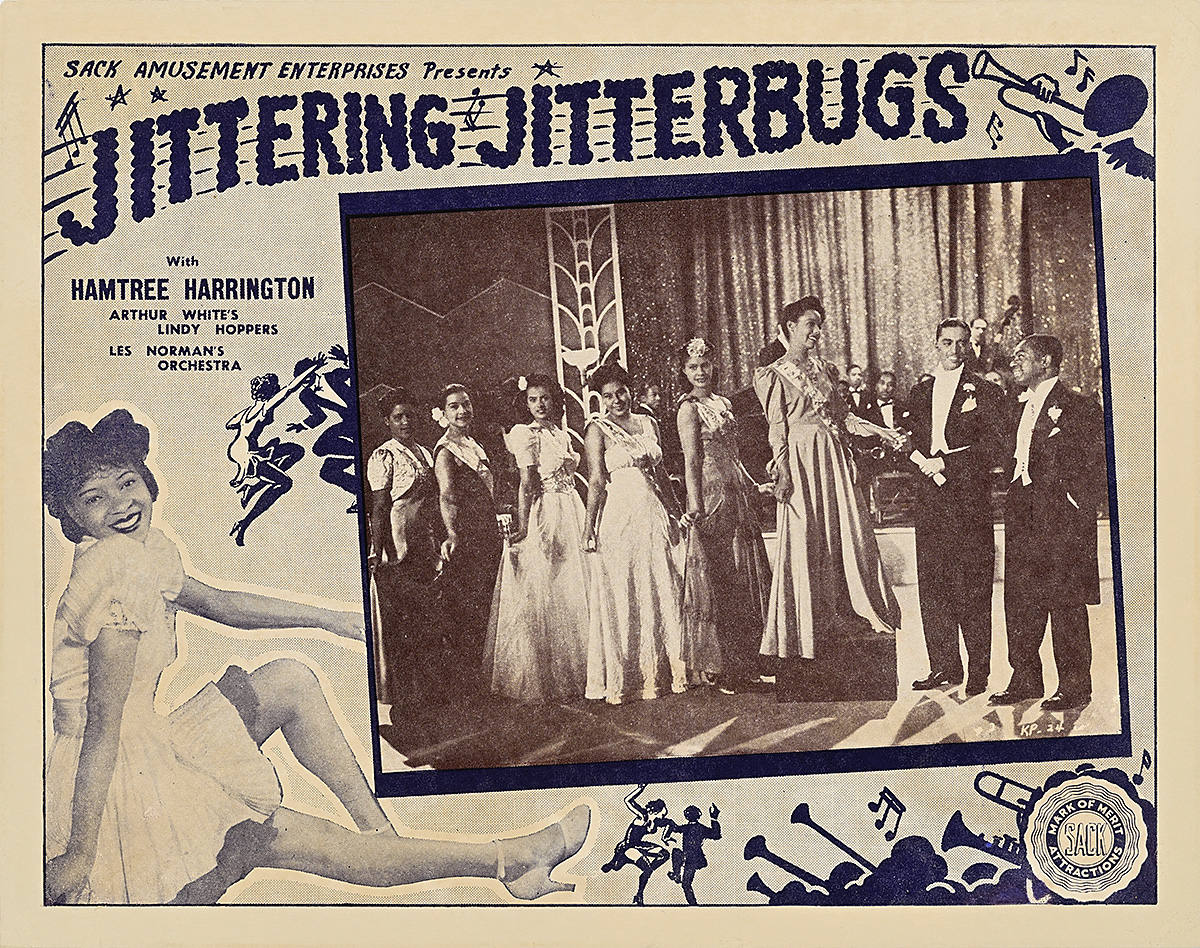
A 1943 lobby card for Jittering Jitterbugs, a short film featuring "Arthur White's Lindy Hoppers", excerpted from the 1939 boxing movie Keep Punching.

Whitey's Lindy Hoppers was a professional performing group of exceptional swing dancers that was first organized in the late 1920s by Herbert "Whitey" White in the Savoy Ballroom and disbanded in 1942 after its male members were drafted into World War II. The group, taking on many different forms and sub-groups, including Whitey's Hopping Maniacs, Harlem Congeroo Dancers, and The Hot Chocolates, were inspired by the choreography of Frankie Manning. In addition to touring nationally and internationally, the group appeared in several films and Broadway theatre productions. Dorothy Dandridge and Sammy Davis Jr. were among the group's celebrity regulars.

== History ==
Beginning in the late 1920s, White, a bouncer at the Savoy Ballroom and former dancing waiter, began organizing exceptional dancers, first under the aegis of George Snowden and then under White himself. Although many members felt mistreated by White, many admired his promotion of the dance.

In 1934, at the age of 14, Norma Miller became the youngest member of the group.

In 1935, the group competed in a dance contest called the Harvest Moon Ball at Madison Square Garden. The group then went on a 7-month European tour.

In 1936, the group began a tour of the U.S. with headliner Ethel Waters. While in California, they met the Marx Brothers, Allan Jones and Maureen O’Sullivan, and made their film debut in A Day at the Races (1937), a movie for Metro-Goldwyn-Mayer. They danced and sang in the number "All God's Chillun Got Rhythm" which featured singer Ivie Anderson and other members of Duke Ellington’s orchestra. Dave Gould, the choreographer, was nominated for an Academy Award for the dance sequence.

In 1938, for a second time, the group competed in the Harvest Moon Ball, hosted that year by Ed Sullivan. Sullivan invited members of the group to perform on Toast of the Town (later called The Ed Sullivan Show). The group also competed in the contest in 1939 and 1940.

Whitey's Lindy Hoppers performed in the movie Hellzapoppin' (1941), where they executed breathtaking flips, slides, kicks, splits, and lifts. When they returned from filming, the group went to Rio de Janeiro to perform. Because of the Attack on Pearl Harbor, they were unable to find transportation home and ended up staying for 10 months, nearly exhausting all of their energy and money.

In 1942, the group went on a 3-week tour with Cootie Williams and Pearl Bailey that included performances at the Apollo Theater, the Howard Theatre in Washington, D.C., and the Royal Theatre in Baltimore. The group disbanded shortly thereafter since the males were called into service during World War II.

After the group disbanded, White moved to Oswego and opened a restaurant. He died of a heart attack in September 1950.

== Members ==
Al Minns, Leon James, Frankie Manning, and Norma Miller are the most notable members of the group — Minns and James in part for their role in the research of Jean and Marshall Stearns's influential book Jazz Dance, Minns for his work with the Hot Shots during the swing revival in the 1980s, Manning for his role in contributing to the swing revival after Minns died in 1985, and Miller for her presentations and instruction at Herräng Dance Camp up until her death in 2019.

Ruthie Reingold, Harry Rosenberg, and Jimmy Valentine were the only white members of the group. Although mixed race dancing was accepted at the Savoy Ballroom, it was frowned upon by the general public and they are not in any of the early videos of the group.

=== Member list ===
==== Members ====
- Louise "Pal" Andrews
- Eleanor "Stumpy" Atkinson (Watson) – 4"11" tall; joined the group in 1937, known for her footwork
- Pettis Dotson "Snooky" Beasley – known for doing a step called the lock
- Lennie Bluett
- Clyde "Brownie" Brown – for a time, Whitey's right-hand man
- John "Tiny" Bunch – at over 300 pounds, his nickname was a joke, but he was revered for his liveliness despite his size. His partner was the petite Dorothy "Dot" Moses.
- Eunice Callen
- Wilda Crawford
- Mildred Cruse
- Joe "Big Stupe" Daniels
- Joyce "Little Stupe" Daniels
- Eddie Davis
- William Downes
- Elnora Dyson
- Arlyne Evans
- "Long-legged George" Greenidge
- Foster "The Dancing Man" Hickson
- Belle Hill
- Cornelia "Connie" Hill – won the Lindy Hop division of the 1939 Harvest Moon Ball with Russell Williams
- Leon James
- Sonny Jenkins
- Ann Johnson
- Dottimae Johnson
- Walter "Count" "Lefty" Johnson
- Frances "Mickey" Jones
- Thomas "Tops" Lee – won the Lindy Hop division of the 1940 Harvest Moon Ball with Wilda Crawford; nicknamed Tops due to his high opinion of himself
- Johnny McAfee
- Emily McCloud
- Maggie McMillan
- Frankie Manning
- Lucille Middleton
- Mae Miller
- Norma Miller
- Al Minns
- Dorothy "Dot" Moses
- Mildred Pollard
- Billy Ricker
- Willa Mae Ricker
- Naomi Waller
- Esther Washington
- Freida Washington
- Oliver "Buckles" Washington
- Thomas Washington
- Billy Williams
- Jerome Williams
- Russell Williams – changed his name to Rasul Ali IBM Aleem in the 1950s; won the Lindy Hop division of the 1939 Harvest Moon Ball with Connie Hill; killed trying to break up a fight

==== White Members ====
- Ruthie Reingold
- Harry Rosenberg
- Jimmy Valentine

== Filmography ==
- A Day at the Races, Metro-Goldwyn-Mayer, 1937 (with the Marx Brothers)
- Manhattan Merry-Go-Round, Republic Pictures, 1937
- Radio City Revels, RKO Pictures, 1938
- Keep Punching, M.C. Pictures, 1939 (aka Jittering Jitterbugs, featuring the Big Apple)
- Hellzapoppin', Universal Pictures, 1941
- Hot Chocolates (Cottontail), RCM Productions, 1941 Soundies
- The Outline of Jitterbug History, RCM Productions, 1942 Soundies
- Sugar Hill Masquerade, Minoco Productions, 1942 Soundies
- Killer Diller, All-American News, 1948 - 4 members of the group

== Broadway theatre ==
- Hot Mikado (with Bill Robinson)
- Black Rhythm (1936)
- Cotton Club Revue (with Cab Calloway) (1938)
