= Herräng =

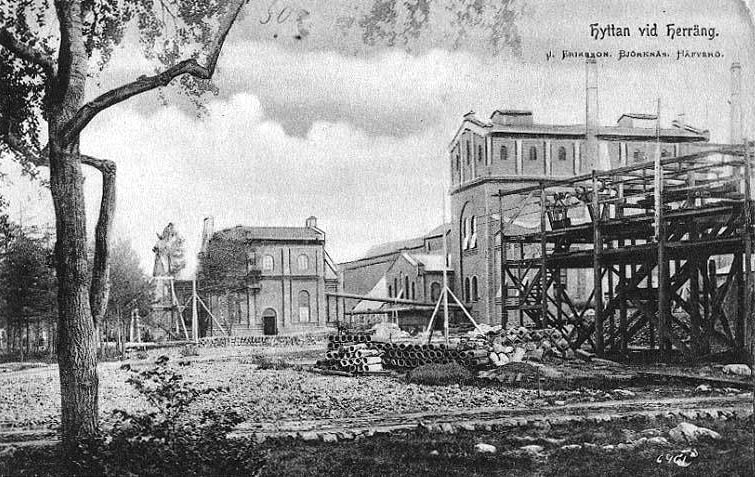
- The Herräng ironworks in 1907

- Location within Stockholm Location within Sweden Location within European Union
- Coordinates: 60°07′43″N 18°38′55″E
- Country: Sweden
- Province: Uppland
- County: Stockholm County
- Municipality: Norrtälje Municipality

Area
  - Total: 1.81 km^{2} (0.70 sq mi)

Population (31 December 2020)
  - Total: 422
  - Density: 233/km^{2} (604/sq mi)
- Time zone: UTC+1 (CET)
  - Summer (DST): UTC+2 (CEST)

Herräng (Swedish pronunciation: [ˈhæ̂rːɛŋ]) is the northernmost locality in Norrtälje Municipality, Stockholm County, Sweden, with 422 inhabitants in 2010. It is located 40 kilometres north of the municipal seat Norrtälje along the coast of Singöfjärden, a bay on Roslagen.

The town has a history of industry and mining. Today it is known mainly for being the site of one of the largest lindy hop dance camps in the world, the Herräng Dance Camp.

== Industrial history ==
Herräng and the area with ore findings that the town is situated close to, Herrängsfältet is the biggest mining area within Stockholm County. Iron ore has been mined in Herräng since the late 16th century. The place was then known as Kuggvass, and one interpretation of the name is that cogs from the Hanseatic League used to land at the place. The mines were situated by the coast, without any source of water power to pump water from the mine, which kept the mining activities at a low level. In 1753, a stream further away south of the bay Bredsundsviken was used. The power was transported to the mine Lappgruvan with a mechanical device known as the Flatrod system (stånggång). Mining was halted for a while and started again in 1822, now with a steam engine to power the pumps.

The company Herrängs Gruf AB was founded in 1889 by Per Nathanael Fröding, who advertised in several newspapers to get financial backing. He even advertised in The Times, and in the advertisement he called Herräng "the new Dannemora" which speaks both of Frödings high plans and of the international status of the Dannemora mines (Dannemora gruvor). At the previous turn of the century, Herräng also had a new ironworks with two blast furnaces. There are many buildings left in Herräng from this time, like houses where the workers lived and of course the industry buildings.

The ore findings were not as rich as Fröding had hoped, and a couple of the mines had to be shut down after just one year of exploitation. Mining in Herräng gradually diminished until 1961, when all mining in the area shut down. The ironworks still ran, using ore from other mines, until 1969 when it closed. The foundry is today used by Roslagsgjuteriet, a division of Nötudden Casting Group. The headframe at one of the mines, Eknäsgruvan, was meant to be repaired and kept as a memory of the mining industry in the area, but it burned in 1982.

== Other sources ==
- Nationalencyklopedin, the entry Herräng (Swedish)
- Herrängsfältet (bergsbruk.se), accessed May 22, 2006 (Swedish)
- Stockholm County Museum website, accessed May 22, 2006 (Swedish)
