= Jitterbug Stroll =

The Jitterbug Stroll is a swing line dance choreographed in 1992 by Ryan Francois, a Lindy Hop dancer and teacher. It is danced to swing music with 12 bar blues structure such as Woody Herman's "Woodchopper's Ball" or Count Basie's "One O'Clock Jump".

In the 1990s, the dance was very popular among Lindy Hoppers, like the Shim Sham.

The step list for the Jitterbug Stroll is as follows:

The dance is organized in groups of 6 bars of 8 beats each. each group of 6 bars faces a different direction on the dance floor - meaning the dancer turns 90 degrees every 6 bars. every group of 6 bars is organized in the following way: 3 bars of a signature step, 1 bar of stroll around/pivot turn, 1 bar of signature step and 1 bar of a break step that helps the dancer turn 90 degrees. The signature step is different for every group of 6 bars.

- first group (the first bar in every group starts with the right leg always)
  - Hustle forward (2 beats)
  - Skip back (2 beats)
  - Boogie Forward twice (4 beats)
  - Hustle forward (2 beats)
  - Skip back (2 beats)
  - Boogie Forward twice (4 beats)
  - Hustle forward (2 beats)
  - Skip back (2 beats)
  - Boogie Forward twice (4 beats)
  - Stroll Around (sometimes also called jazz pivot turn) (8 beats)
  - Hustle forward (2 beats)
  - Skip back (2 beats)
  - Boogie Forward twice (4 beats)
  - Break step (4 beats) (step right, tap left behind right, step left, tap right behind left)
  - Turn 90 degrees (4 beats) (step right, turn 90 degrees, step back left, step back right, step forward left)
- second group
  - Knee slap right (2 beats)
  - Knee slap left (2 beats)
  - Kick right and Shorty george 3 times (4 beats)
  - Knee slap right (2 beats)
  - Knee slap left (2 beats)
  - Kick right and Shorty george 3 times (4 beats)
  - Knee slap right (2 beats)
  - Knee slap left (2 beats)
  - Kick right and Shorty george 3 times (to the left) (4 beats)
  - Stroll Around (same as above)
  - Knee slap right (2 beats)
  - Knee slap left (2 beats)
  - Kick right and Shorty george 3 times (4 beats)
  - Break Step and Turn around (8 beats same as above)
- third group
  - Suzie Q left (start with right leg cross over left) (8 beats)
  - Suzie Q right (start with left leg cross over right) (8 beats)
  - Suzie Q left (start with right leg cross over left) (8 beats)
  - Stroll Around (same as above)
  - Suzie Q left (start with right leg cross over left) (8 beats)
  - Break Step and Turn around (8 beats same as above)
- fourth group (last one)
  - Boogie back kicking with right leg (4 beats)
  - Tick Tock (to the right) (4 beats)
  - Boogie back kicking with left leg (4 beats)
  - Tick Tock (to the left) (4 beats)
  - Boogie back kicking with right leg (4 beats)
  - Tick Tock (to the right) (4 beats)
  - Stroll Around (same as above)
  - Boogie back kicking with right leg (4 beats)
  - Tick Tock (to the right) (4 beats)
  - Break Step and Turn around (8 beats same as above)
- and repeat from the top

When doing the Tick Tock you can tilt your head as a pendulum, starting in the direction you are moving.

This dance can be danced to any song that has a 12 Bar structure or a 6 bar AABA chorus structure. The AABA chorus structure would allow you to do the Suzie Q's on the B chorus line (sometimes referred to as a Bridge), adding enhanced musicality to your dance.
