= Jazz dance =

Performance dance technique

Jazz dance is a performance dance and style that arose in the United States in the early 20th century. Jazz dance may allude to vernacular jazz, Broadway or dramatic jazz. The two types expand on African American vernacular styles of dance that arose with jazz music. Vernacular jazz dance incorporates ragtime moves, Charleston, Lindy hop and mambo. Popular vernacular jazz dance performers include The Whitman Sisters, Florence Mills, Ethel Waters, Al Minns and Leon James, Frankie Manning, Norma Miller, Dawn Hampton, and Katherine Dunham. Dramatic jazz dance performed on the show stage was promoted by Jack Cole, Bob Fosse, Eugene Louis Faccuito, and Gus Giordano.

The term 'jazz dance' has been used in ways that have little or nothing to do with jazz music. Since the 1940s, Hollywood movies and Broadway shows have used the term to describe the choreographies of Bob Fosse and Jerome Robbins. In the 1990s, colleges and universities applied to the term to classes offered by physical education departments in which students dance to various forms of pop music, rarely jazz.

== Swing dancing ==
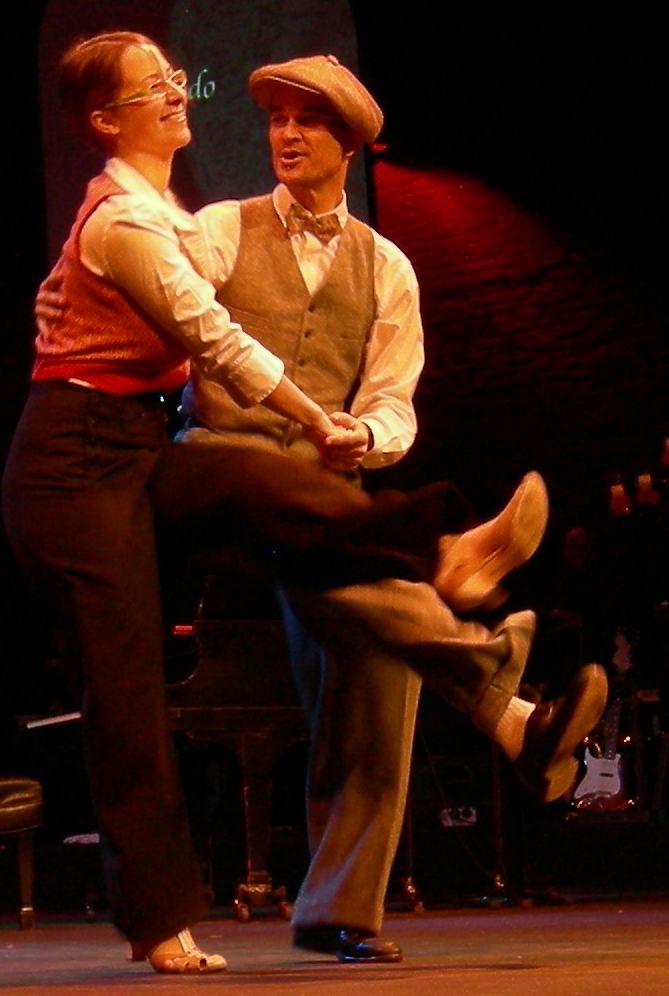
A couple dances the Charleston.

In 1917, jazz pianist Spencer Williams wrote a song called "Shim-Me-Sha-Wabble" which inspired a jazz dance called the shimmy. The shimmy is done by holding the body still "except for the shoulders, which are quickly alternated back and forth". The dances that emerged during this period were the Charleston and the Lindy hop. The Charleston is "characterized by its toes-in, heels-out twisting steps". It can be done as a solo or with any number of people.

The Lindy hop was a wild and spontaneous partner dance that was extremely rhythmically conscious. When the Great Depression began in October 1929, many people turned to dance. Because of this, the Charleston and the Lindy hop are now considered to be under the umbrella term "swing dance stylized, continuously flowing movements that developed the technique and style for the combinations that followed". Cole's style has been called hip, hard, and cool". Fosse combined "vaudeville, striptease, magic shows, nightclubs, film and Broadway musicals".

== Pop music and television ==
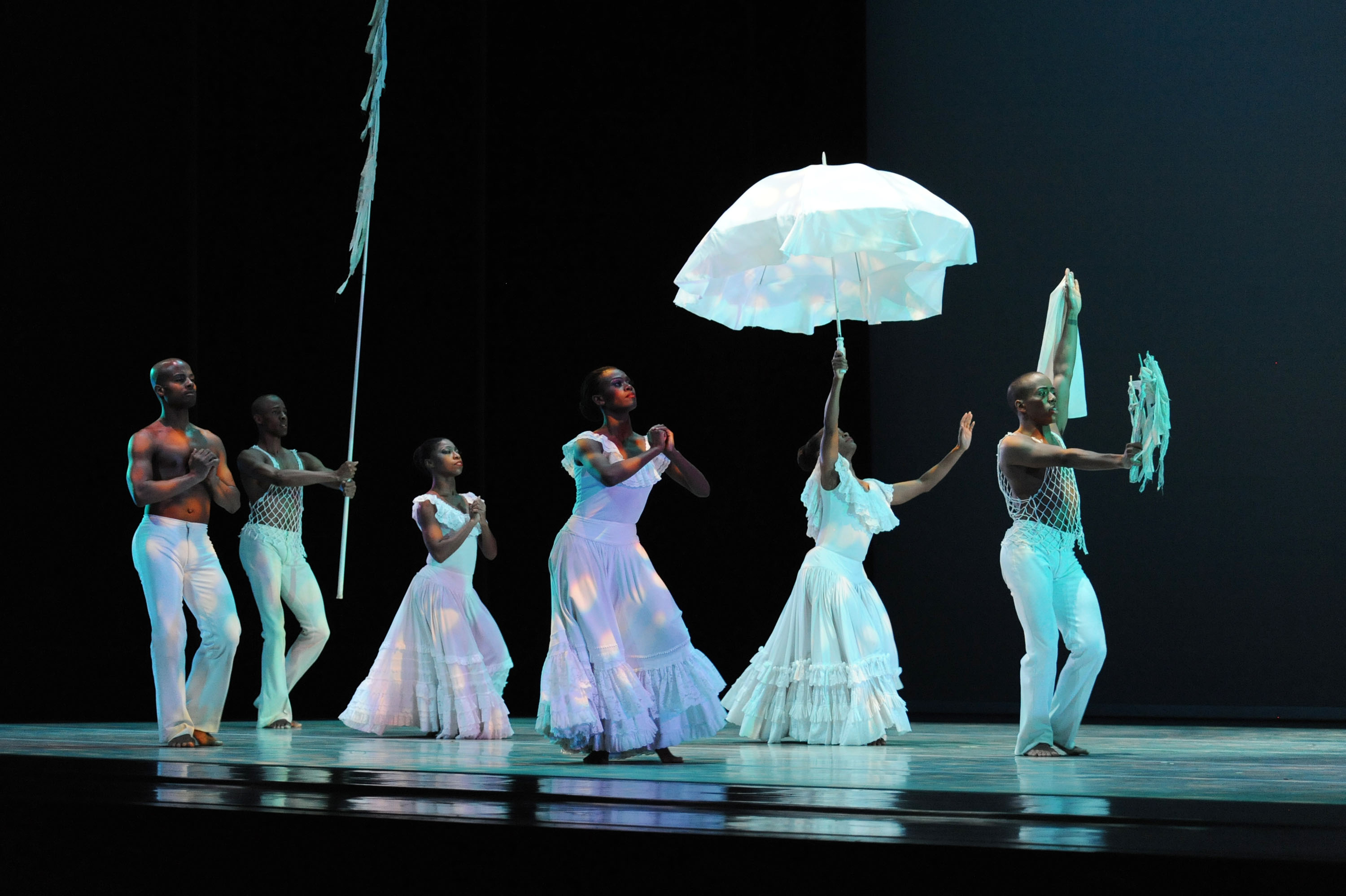
Alvin Ailey Dance Theater

Contemporary jazz became well known because of its television shows unlike So You Think You Can Dance. Mia Michaels's earlier work exemplifies this style. Some other companies and choreographers that create contemporary jazz dance are Sonya Tayeh, Mandy Moore, and Hubbard Street Dance Chicago. Commercial jazz, which has been popular since the 1980s, combines aspects of hip hop and jazz and is often done to pop music. This style can be seen in the music videos of Janet Jackson and Paula Abdul. Commercial jazz often includes more "tricks." Commercial jazz and contemporary jazz are both seen at dance competitions. Another variety of jazz is Latin jazz. "Maria Torres developed and popularized the fusion at Broadway Dance Center". Latin jazz has an emphasis on the movement of hips and isolations. It can be seen in the films El Cantante and Dance with Me, as well as on TV dance shows.

== Dancers, directors, choreographers ==
- Jack Cole influenced Matt Mattox, Bob Fosse, Jerome Robbins, and Gwen Verdon, and is credited with popularizing the theatrical form of jazz dance with his great number of choreographic works on television and Broadway.
- Katherine Dunham is an anthropologist, choreographer, and pioneer in black theatrical dance who introduced isolations jazz dance.
- Eugene Louis Faccuito also known as Luigi, was an American jazz dancer, teacher, choreographer, and creator of the first codified jazz technique, the Luigi Technique.
- Bob Fosse, choreographer and film director, revolutionized jazz dance with his sexually suggestive movements. His choreography is very recognizable and can be found in the musicals and films that he has choreographed, such as Cabaret and Chicago.
- Gus Giordano was a jazz dancer and choreographer in Chicago known for his clean, precise movement.
- Patsy Swayze, choreographer and dance instructor, combined jazz and ballet, founded the Houston Jazz Ballet Company, and served as its director.

== See also ==
- Jazz-funk dance
- Jitterbug
- Swing (dance)
- Tap dance
- Vaudeville

== Bibliography ==
- Bailey, A. Peter. Revelations: The Autobiography of Alvin Ailey. Carol Publishing Group, 1995. ISBN 978-0-8065-1861-9
- Carter, Curtis. "Improvisation in Dance". The Journal of Aesthetics and Art Criticism. 58, No. 2, p. 181–90. jstor.org
- Cohan, Robert. The Dance Workshop. Gaia Books, 1989. ISBN 978-0-04-790010-5
- Crease, Robert. Divine Frivolity: Hollywood Representations of the Lindy Hop, 1937–1942. In Representing Jazz. Durham: Duke University Press, 1995.
- Dunning, Jennifer. Alvin Ailey: A Life in Dance. Da Capo Press, 1998. ISBN 978-0-306-80825-8
- Reid, Molly. New Orleans: A Haven for Swing Dance Beginners, Professionals. The Times-Picayune. 21 January 2010
- Seguin, Eliane Histoire de la danse jazz. Editions Chiron, 2003. ISBN 978-2-7027-0782-1
- Torbert, Margot L. Teaching Dance Jazz. Margot Torbert, 2000. ISBN 978-0-9764071-0-2
