= Norma Miller =

American Lindy hop dancer (1919–2019)

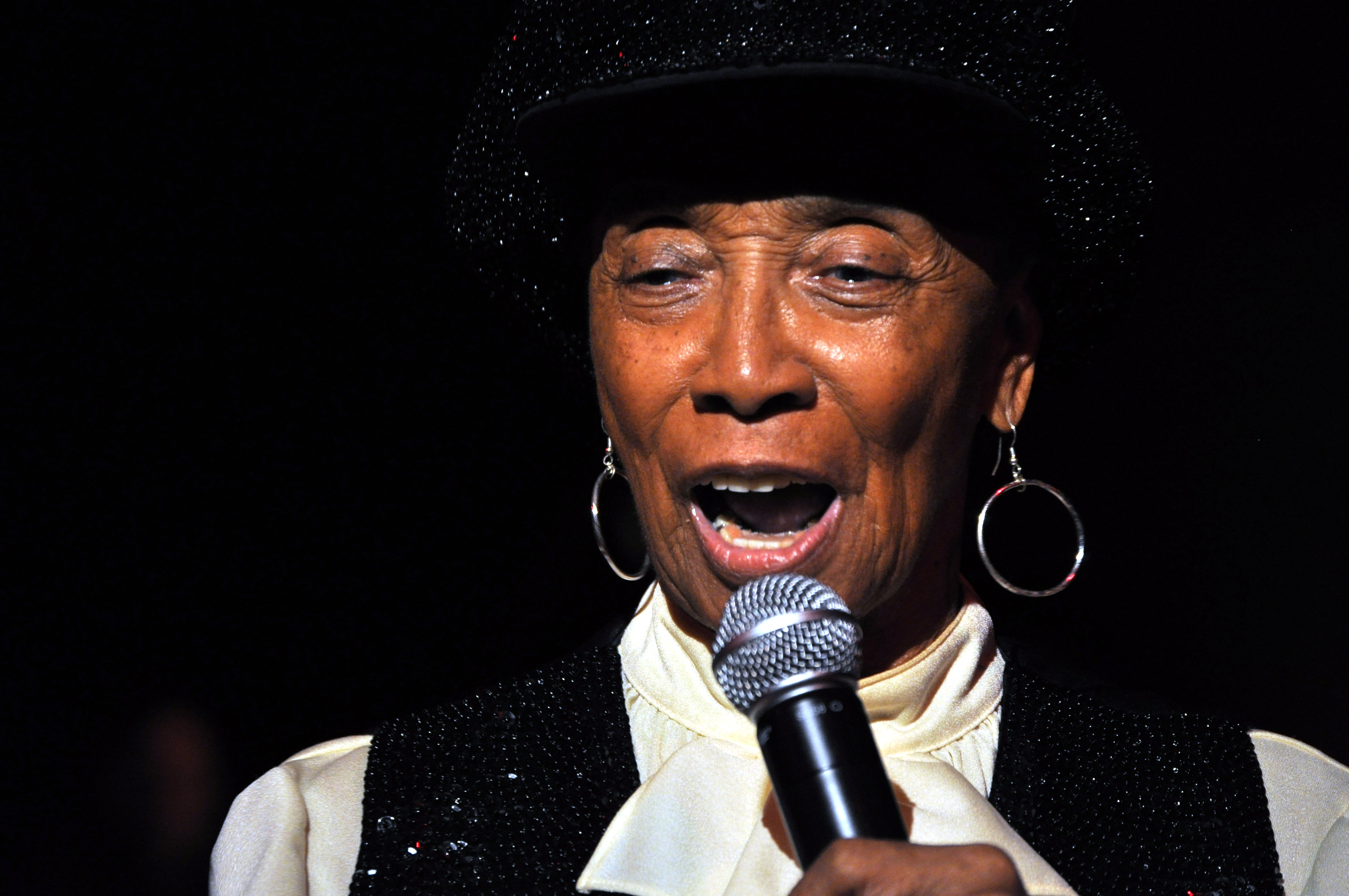
- Miller in 2009
- Born: Norma Adele Miller; December 2, 1919; Harlem, New York City, U.S.
- Died: May 5, 2019 (aged 99); Fort Myers, Florida, U.S.
- Resting place: Woodlawn Cemetery
- Occupations: Dancer, choreographer, comedian, author, actress, singer, songwriter, creative director
- Years active: 1932–2019

Norma Adele Miller (December 2, 1919 – May 5, 2019) was an American Lindy hop dancer, choreographer, actress, author, and comedian known as the "Queen of Swing".

== Early life ==
Miller was born in 1919 in Harlem, New York City, to mother Alma, a charwoman, and father Norman, a shipyard worker, both from Bridgetown, Barbados. Norma was named after her father, who died from pneumonia a month before her birth. She had an older sister, Dot.

Even though her mother struggled to pay the rent, Norma was enrolled in dance classes from a very young age. At the age of five, she was performing at amateur nights in theaters. Miller knew she wanted to be a dancer very early on:

Black girls didn't have many outlets. You had laundry. You had hairdresser. Or teacher. Now, I didn't qualify for none of those. I could dance, I just could just do it naturally.

When the Great Depression began in 1929, Miller and her family moved to a cramped and noisy tenement apartment on 140th street that overlooked the Savoy Ballroom. The windows were open due to the lack of air conditioning and she could hear the house band, which was led by Chick Webb and included (after 1935) singer Ella Fitzgerald. From her fire escape, she would watch the dancers perform the Black Bottom, the Shimmy, the Charleston and the Shim Sham. She would practice dancing in her living room and her school gymnasium.

On Easter Sunday in 1932, when Miller was dressed up from church services, she was dancing outside the Savoy Ballroom, too young to enter. Twist Mouth George Ganaway, "the greatest dancer at the Savoy", was impressed with her dancing. Ganaway gave Miller a Coca-Cola and asked her to dance in the ballroom for the first time, before Miller was escorted back outside.

Miller said of the experience:

He just threw me up; my feet never touched the ground. People were screaming and he put me on top of his shoulders, walked me around the ballroom . . . and put me back outside. Greatest moment in my life and I'm excited, excited, and I'm gonna go home and tell my mother and my sister — and then I said no, I better not say nothin'!

== Career ==
Miller attended Manhattan School of the Arts on the Upper West Side. She would dance at the Renaissance Ballroom & Casino, where young people were allowed to dance on Sunday afternoons. In 1934, along with her high school dance partner, Sonny Ashby, she won the Savoy Lindy Hop Contest, held at the Apollo Theater. The next day, Herbert "Whitey" White, the dance master at the Savoy, hired her as the youngest member of his dance troupe, Whitey's Lindy Hoppers.

In 1935, Miller competed in a dance contest called the Harvest Moon Ball at Madison Square Garden. She said she lost the contest because her blouse opened. She then went on a seven-month European tour.

In 1936, Whitey's Lindy Hoppers began a tour of the U.S. with headliner Ethel Waters. In 1937, while on tour in California, she met the Marx Brothers, Allan Jones and Maureen O'Sullivan, and made her film debut in A Day at the Races, a movie by Metro-Goldwyn-Mayer. She danced and sang in the number "All God's Chillun Got Rhythm" which featured singer Ivie Anderson and Duke Ellington's orchestra. Dave Gould, the choreographer, was nominated for an Academy Award for the dance sequence. After the tour, Miller was hospitalized for fatigue until her 18th birthday in December 1937.

Miller rejoined Whitey's Lindy Hoppers in 1938. For a second time, the group competed in the Harvest Moon Ball, hosted that year by Ed Sullivan. Miller and her partner placed in the top 3, and Sullivan invited them to perform on Toast of the Town (later called The Ed Sullivan Show).

Whitey's Lindy Hoppers performed in the 1941 movie Hellzapoppin', where Miller had a memorable role as a dancing cook, executing breathtaking flips, slides, kicks, splits, and lifts. When they returned from filming, the group went to Rio de Janeiro to perform. Because of the attack on Pearl Harbor, they were unable to find transportation home and ended up staying for 10 months, nearly exhausting all of their energy and money.

In 1942, Miller joined Whitey's Lindy Hoppers on a three-week tour with Cootie Williams and Pearl Bailey that included performances at the Apollo Theater, the Howard Theatre in Washington, D.C., and the Royal Theatre in Baltimore. She left the group due to "accounting differences" with Whitey, who was known to pay the performers poorly. The group disbanded shortly thereafter since the males were called into service during World War II.

In 1943, she took dance classes on the style of Martha Graham taught by Sophie Maslow, the style of Hanya Holm taught by Mary Anthony, and classes by Doris Humphrey and Charles Weidman. To fund the classes, she began working as a producer for Smalls Paradise, a nightclub in Harlem. She toured Canada and the United States and lived in Los Angeles before returning to New York in 1946.

From 1952 to 1968, Miller directed and toured with the Norma Miller Dancers and Norma Miller and Her Jazzmen, both of which included Frankie Manning's son Chazz Young as well as her long-time partner Billy Ricker. In 1954, her group toured nationally with Count Basie. In 1956, she lived in Miami and performed comedy shows with Cab Calloway and George Kirby, produced by Mervyn Nelson. In Miami, she suffered from racism in renting housing, and was forced to ride in the back of buses and dine in black eateries.

In 1959, Miller moved to Las Vegas, where she lived for much of the 1960s and 1970s. There, she performed with Redd Foxx and Sammy Davis Jr.

Miller turned to comedy at the advice of Foxx, who told her:

Look, you're not going to be able to dance any longer. Your knees are knocking. You better learn to talk.

From February 1972 until 1974, Miller traveled around Vietnam, performing her solo comedy routine for American troops in the Vietnam War. In 1977, she produced a show at the Village Gate in New York and then moved back to Las Vegas, where she starred in and produced shows. In 1982, she moved back to New York and in 1990, she moved back to Las Vegas.

Beginning in the 1980s, Miller played a major role in the swing revival. She was a teacher of swing dance, and taught master classes at Stanford University and the University of Hawaiʻi.

For several years in the mid- to late 2010s, Miller lived in both Fort Myers, Florida, and Italy.

From May 9–11, 2014, Miller performed for the first time in Italy at the "L.O.T. (Lindy Old Timers) event" in Montesilvano, beginning a collaboration with the Italian Swing Dance Society that lead to five years of concerts, festivals, conventions, recordings and books.

From 2015 to 2018, Miller wrote new lyrics and songs that were arranged and recorded with the Italian Billy Bros. Swing Orchestra. In December 2016, the CD A Swingin' Love Fest with Norma Miller is issued with the Orchestra. From September to October 2017, at age 98, she was on a European tour with the Orchestra, consisting of seven concerts in Italy, Slovenja, and Denmark. From August to October 2018, she was on an Italian tour with the Billy Bros. Swing Orchestra, performing in Pescara, Perugia, Genova, Milano, and Palermo. On October 21, 2018, Miller performed a last concert at the Teatro S. Cecilia in Palermo; she was almost 99.

In May 2017, a new edition (sold out) of her book Swing, Baby Swing! was produced with English and Italian text, featuring previously unreleased photographs and other additions. In September 2018, a second printing of the new edition of the book was issued with new pictures, notes and a last chapter about Miller's last four years of living in Italy.

In September 2017, Miller's song "Gimme da Beat" was remixed and issued on the CD Electro Swing New Generation 01 by French DJs Bart & Baker.

Miller presented and taught workshops at Herräng Dance Camp until 2018, when she was 98.

A CD with six more songs of Miller was produced in 2021 with the Billy Bros. Swing Orchestra.

== Personal life ==
Miller never married. From 1941 to 1947, she was in a relationship with performer Roy Glenn, whom she met while filming Hellzapoppin'. They put off marriage plans many times and decided to separate in 1947. Glenn died in 1971.

== Death ==
On May 5, 2019, Miller died from congestive heart failure at the age of 99. She had just produced new music.

== Published works ==
=== Books ===
Miller wrote or played a major role in several books, including:

- Me & John Biffar: A Love Story, which chronicles her friendship with filmmaker John Biffar.
- Swing, Baby Swing! follows the evolution of swing dance into the 21st century.
- Swingin' at the Savoy: The Memoir of a Jazz Dancer, Miller's autobiography, describes her early life and meetings with Frankie Manning, Ella Fitzgerald, Duke Ellington, Count Basie, Ethel Waters, and Chick Webb.
- Stompin' at the Savoy: The Story of Norma Miller is a children's book by Alan Govenar, chronicling her life, published in 2006.
- The Redd Foxx Encyclopedia of Black Humor, was co-written by Miller and Redd Foxx in 1977.

=== Discography ===
- Healthy, Sexless & Single, Norma Miller; 1972.
- A Swingin' Love Fest with Norma Miller, Billy Bros. Swing Orchestra; 2016.
- Electro Swing New Generation 01, by Bart & Baker, feat. "Gimme da Beat"; 2017.

== Filmography ==
Miller's most well-known film appearance is in the lindy hop scene in Hellzapoppin', featuring Whitey's Lindy Hoppers.

=== Films ===
Year	Film	Role
1937	A Day at the Races	Dancer
1939	Keep Punchin	Dancer
1941	Hellzapoppin'	Dancer (Cook)
1976	Sparkle	Doreen
1977	The Richard Pryor Special	Bar Patron
1992	Malcolm X	Roseland Dancer
1995	Captiva Island	Clara

=== Television ===
Year	Title	Role	Notes
1940	Toast of the Town (later The Ed Sullivan Show)	Dancer	
1973–1974	Sanford and Son	Dolly / Roxie / Jackie	3 episodes
1976	Grady	Mavis	Episode: "Grady Takes a Wife"
1977	Sanford Arms	Dolly Wilson	Episode: "Bye, Fred, Hi, Phil"
1979	Vega$	Maid	Episode: "Red Handed"
1984	Eye on Dance	Herself	Episode: "Talley Beatty & Norma Miller"
1992	Stompin' at the Savoy	Choreographer, Dancer	

=== Documentary appearances ===
Year	Documentary
1989	Call of the Jitterbug
1993	Mo' Funny: Black Comedy in America
1996	E! True Hollywood Story
1999	American Masters
2000	Jazz by Ken Burns (episodes 4, 5, and 6)
2006	Queen of Swing
2012	The Savoy King: Chick Webb & the Music That Changed America
2013	Moms Mabley: I Got Somethin' to Tell You
2015	Unsung Hollywood: Redd Foxx
2016	Unsung Hollywood: Eartha Kitt
2016	Alive and Kicking
2019	Ella Fitzgerald: Just One of Those Things

=== Broadway productions ===
- Swingin' The Dream, 1939, dancer
- Lew Leslie's Blackbirds of 1939, 1939, dancer
- Run, Little Chillun, 1943, dancer

== Awards ==
In 2003, Miller was honored with a National Heritage Fellowship from the National Endowment for the Arts for creating and continuing to preserve "the acrobatic style of swing dancing known as the Lindy Hop".

== See also ==
- List of dancers
