= A Day at the Races (film) =

1937 Marx Brothers film by Sam Wood

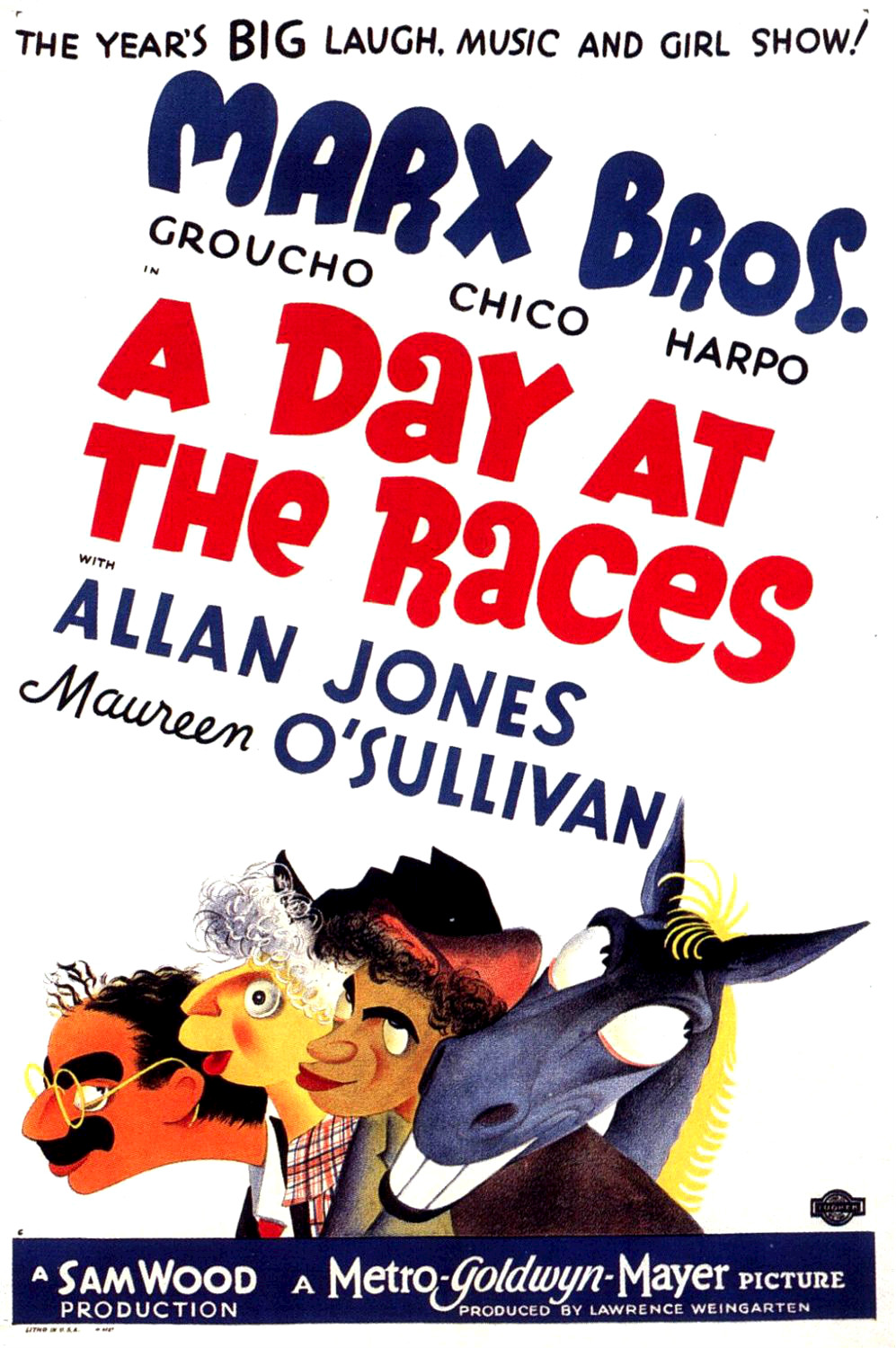
- Theatrical release poster
- Directed by: Sam Wood
- Written by: Robert Pirosh; George Seaton; George Oppenheimer
- Screenplay by: Al Boasberg (uncredited); Leon Gordon (uncredited); George S. Kaufman; Carey Wilson
- Produced by: Sam Wood; Irving Thalberg (uncredited); Lawrence Weingarten (uncredited)
- Starring: Groucho Marx; Harpo Marx; Chico Marx; Allan Jones; Maureen O'Sullivan; Margaret Dumont
- Cinematography: Joseph Ruttenberg
- Edited by: Frank E. Hull
- Music by: Walter Jurmann; Bronislau Kaper; Franz Waxman
- Distributed by: Metro-Goldwyn-Mayer
- Release date: June 11, 1937
- Running time: 109 minutes
- Country: United States
- Language: English
- Budget: $2,016,000
- Box office: $2,305,000

The film's trailer

A Day at the Races is a 1937 American comedy film, the seventh starring the Marx Brothers (Groucho, Harpo and Chico), with Allan Jones, Maureen O'Sullivan and Margaret Dumont in supporting roles. The film was a major box-office success.

== Plot ==
The Standish Sanitarium, owned by Judy Standish, has fallen on hard times. Banker J.D. Morgan, who owns a nearby race track, hotel and nightclub, holds the mortgage on the sanitarium and is attempting to foreclose on it in order to convert the building into a casino. Tony, Judy's faithful employee, suggests seeking financial help from wealthy patient Emily Upjohn, a hypochondriac. After being pronounced healthy by doctors, Mrs. Upjohn threatens to leave for treatment by Dr. Hugo Z. Hackenbush. Tony overhears her praise of Hackenbush, who is, unknown to anyone, a horse doctor. Tony invites Hackenbush to run the sanitarium so that Mrs. Upjohn will stay and help Judy financially. Tony contacts Hackenbush in Florida by telegram. When Hackenbush arrives, he insults Mr. Whitmore, the sanitarium's business manager and Morgan's accomplice, who is suspicious of Hackenbush's medical background.

Judy's beau, singer Gil Stewart, who performs at Morgan's nightclub, has just spent his life savings on a racehorse named Hi-Hat. He hopes that the horse, which he purchased from Morgan, will win a race so that the prize money will allow Judy to save the sanitarium. Judy and Gil have an argument about the horse but reconcile when Gill admits that he has doubts about Hi-Hat's ability to win. Gil has no money left to buy Hi-Hat's feed, and he, Tony and Stuffy, Hi-Hat's jockey, must resort to trickery to thwart a sheriff who has come to collect money for the feed bill. Tony raises some money by scamming Hackenbush, first selling him an encoded tip on a horse and then the numerous books needed to decipher it.

With help from Tony and Stuffy, Hackenbush sabotages Whitmore's attempts to reveal that he is a horse doctor, first by prank-calling Whitmore, then by hiding a blonde floozy from Mrs. Upjohn and disrupting an examination of Mrs. Upjohn by another doctor. Tony, Stuffy, Hackenbush, Gil and Judy hide in Hi-Hat's stable. Upset by the thought of losing the sanitarium, Gil tries to lift Judy's spirits with a song. Stuffy helps by leading a community of poor black people into the stable to dance. Armed with a letter from the state medical board confirming that Hackenbush is a horse doctor, Morgan, Whitmore and the sheriff arrive to arrest him. When Hi-Hat hears the voice of Morgan, his cruel previous owner, he bolts and jumps over several obstacles in the way. Judy suggests to Gil that Hi-Hat is a jumper, and Gil enters him into the upcoming steeplechase race.

On the day of the race, Hackenbush, Tony and Stuffy delay the start until Gil sneaks Hi-Hat behind Morgan's back. They all use Hi-Hat's hatred of Morgan to their advantage, using Morgan's voice to anger him before he jumps the fences. On the last lap, Hi-Hat and Morgan's horse falter, and when they reach the finish line, it appears that Morgan's horse has won. But when the winning horse reacts aggressively when Morgan enters the winner's circle, Stuffy realizes that the mud-covered animals were switched after the accident. Morgan's jockey rode Hi-Hat to the finish, making Gil's horse the winner and saving the sanitarium. Hackenbush tells the truth to Mrs. Upjohn and proposes to her, promising to "never look at any other horse".

== Cast ==
- Groucho Marx as Dr Hugo Z. Hackenbush
- Chico Marx as Tony
- Harpo Marx as Stuffy
- Allan Jones as Gil Stewart
- Maureen O'Sullivan as Judy Standish
- Margaret Dumont as Emily Upjohn
- Douglass Dumbrille as J.D. Morgan
- Leonard Ceeley as Whitmore
- Sig Ruman as Dr Leopold X. Steinberg (credited as Sig Rumann)
- Esther Muir as Flo
- Robert Middlemass as the Sheriff
- Vivien Fay as specialty dancer
- Ivie Anderson as specialty singer (in number "All God's Chillun Got Rhythm")
- Richard Farnsworth appears uncredited as a jockey
- Darby Jones appears in an uncredited role as a trumpet player during the "All God's Chillun Got Rhythm" number

== Production ==
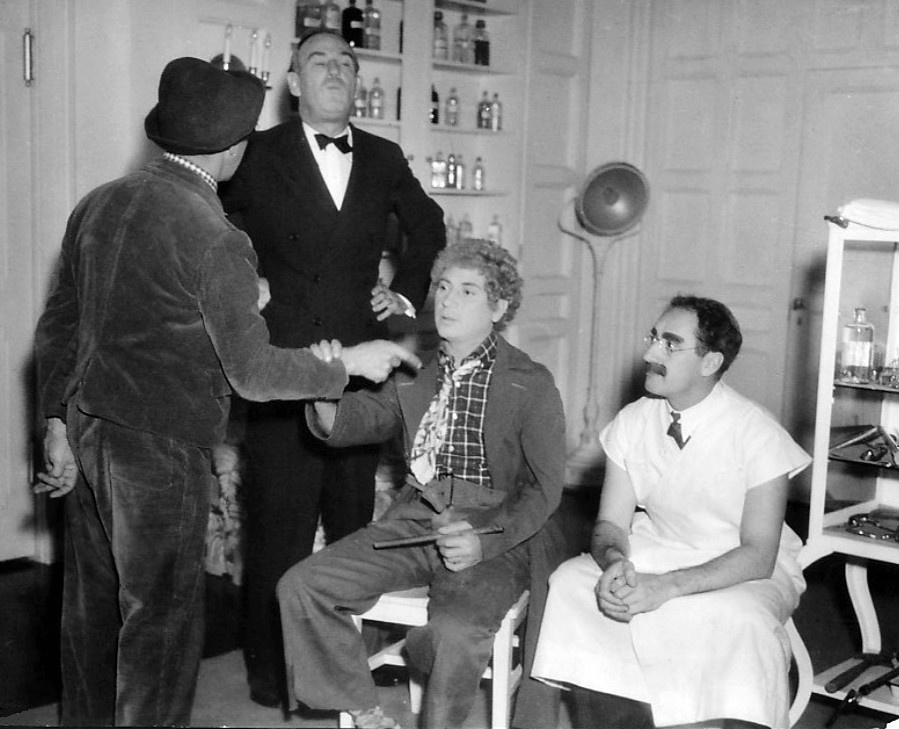
The Marx Brothers on the set with director Sam Wood

The film went through numerous outlines, treatments, drafts, revisions and a total of eighteen different scripts before arriving at its final version. A major portion of the final screenplay was written by Al Boasberg, who also contributed to A Night at the Opera, but due to a disagreement with MGM, he chose not to be given any credit for his work. As they had with A Night at the Opera, the Brothers honed the comic material during a pre-production vaudeville tour.

Groucho's character was originally named "Quackenbush" but was changed to "Hackenbush" over threats of lawsuits by several real doctors actually named Quackenbush. In My Life with Groucho: A Son's Eye View, Arthur Marx relates that in his later years, Groucho increasingly referred to himself by the name Hackenbush.

During production, Irving Thalberg, who had brought the Marx Brothers to MGM in 1934, died suddenly in September 1936 of pneumonia at the age of 37. Thalberg's death left the Marxes without a champion at MGM, and the studio never gave the same level of care and attention to the team they had received under Thalberg. As a result, the Marx Brothers' three later MGM films are generally considered to be vastly inferior to the first two produced by Thalberg.

The original release of A Day at the Races presented the water carnival sequence in light brown sepia and the ballet scene with a blue tint.

Santa Anita Park in Arcadia, California, was used as a filming location for some of the racetrack scenes.

== Music ==
The songs in the film, by Bronislaw Kaper, Walter Jurmann, and Gus Kahn, are "On Blue Venetian Waters", "Tomorrow Is Another Day", and "All God's Chillun Got Rhythm" (featuring Ivie Anderson from Duke Ellington's orchestra). Two other songs were slated for the film, but ultimately cut. One, "Dr. Hackenbush", sung by Groucho about "what a great doctor he is" ("No matter what I treat them for they die from something else") was performed on the pre-filming tour, but was apparently never shot; Groucho later recorded the song separately. The other, "A Message From The Man In The Moon", sung by Allan Jones, was shot, but was cut at the last minute because the film was too long. The melody is heard during the opening titles, as some incidental music during the Water Carnival scene, and is "reprised" by Groucho during the final scene. The DVD release of the film includes a rediscovered audio recording for the film soundtrack of the song, performed by Allan Jones.

The film's Lindy Hop dance sequence is set to the tune of "All God's Chillun Got Rhythm", and featuring Whitey's Lindy Hoppers, including Willamae Ricker, Snookie Beasley, Ella Gibson, George Greenidge, Dot Miller, Johnny Innis, Norma Miller and Leon James.

"Cosi-Cosa", a song sung by Allan Jones in A Night at the Opera, makes an instrumental cameo at the opening of the climactic racetrack scene. The tune would be heard again in the Marxes' final MGM film, The Big Store (1941).

=== Musical numbers ===
- "On Blue Venetian Waters"
- "Tomorrow Is Another Day"
- "Gabriel (Who Dat Man)"
- "All God's Chillun Got Rhythm"
- "Nobody Knows the Trouble I've Seen"
- "A Message from the Man in the Moon"
- "Hungarian Rhapsody No. 2"/"On the Beach at Bali-Bali" (performed by Chico on the piano)

== Reception ==
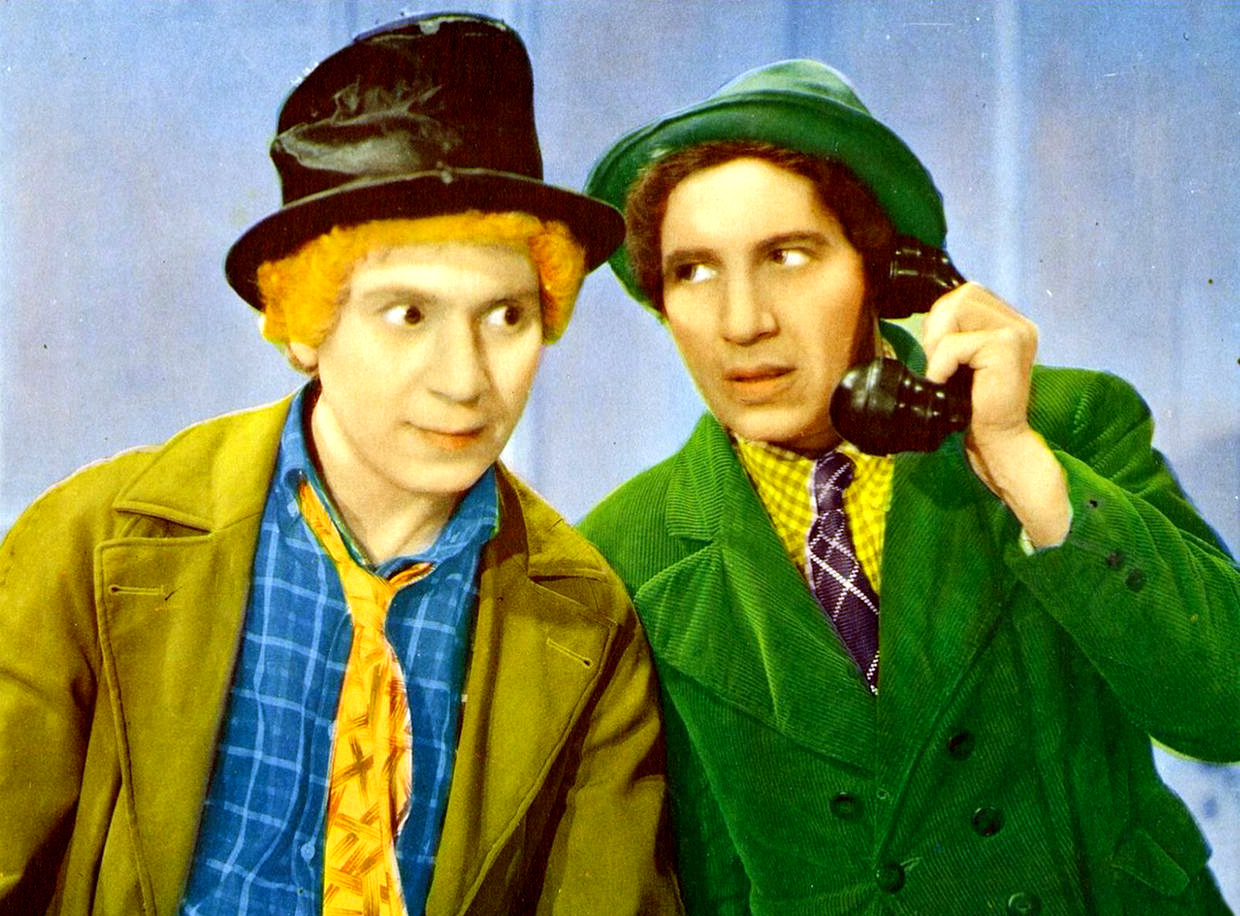
Colorized publicity shot featuring Harpo and Chico.

Contemporary reviews from critics continued to be positive for the Marx Brothers through their seventh film. John T. McManus of The New York Times called it "comparatively bad Marx," although still deserving of "a much better than passing grade" because "any Marx brothers motion picture is an improvement upon almost any other sustained screen slapstick." Variety declared, "Surefire film fun and up to the usual parity of the madcap Marxes." Harrison's Reports wrote, "Very good! The Marx Brothers are at their best and funniest here." John Mosher of The New Yorker was also positive, writing that "Groucho, Harpo, and Chico are in full blast again," and the film "reaches a fever pitch even beyond earlier records." The Chicago Tribune called it a "ridiculous farce, plummed with unique gags, laugh provoking situations, fast action ... The finale sends audiences away grinning and happy."

Writing for Night and Day magazine of London, Graham Greene gave the film a generally good review, summarizing it as "easily the best film to be seen in London", but he criticized some elements of the film's portrayal. Greene observed that the film gave him "a nostalgia for the old cheap rickety sets" rather than the realistic sets, and although he praised Harpo's performance as "shin[ing] the brightest", he complained that the strong realism in O'Sullivan's acting set up a strong juxtaposition against the "silliness" of the Marx brothers' antics.

The film is recognized by American Film Institute in these lists:

- 2000: AFI's 100 Years...100 Laughs – #59
- 2005: AFI's 100 Years...100 Movie Quotes:
  - Flo Marlowe: "Oh, hold me closer! Closer! Closer!"
  - Dr. Hugo Z. Hackenbush: "If I hold you any closer, I'll be in back of you."

— Nominated

According to MGM records, the film earned $1,602,000 domestically and $703,000 foreign, but because of its high cost recorded a loss of $543,000.

== Awards ==
The dance sequence for "All God's Chillun Got Rhythm" was nominated for the short-lived Academy Award for Best Dance Direction, only given from 1935 to 1937.

== In popular culture ==
British rock band Queen named their 1976 studio album after the film. Their 1975 studio album was named after A Night at the Opera, the Marx Brothers' previous film. Groucho sent a handwritten note to the band, congratulating them on their excellent taste.

== See also ==
- List of films about horses
- List of films about horse racing
