= Alive and Kicking (2016 film) =

- Theatrical release poster
- Directed by: Susan Glatzer
- Produced by: Susan Glatzer
- Starring: Dawn Hampton; Frankie Manning; Norma Miller
- Cinematography: John MacDonald
- Edited by: Heidi Zimmerman; Nick Andert
- Music by: Steven Argila
- Production companies: Swing Pictures; Blumhouse Productions
- Distributed by: Magnolia Pictures
- Release dates: March 14, 2016 (South by Southwest); April 7, 2017 (Internet)
- Running time: 85 minutes
- Country: United States
- Language: English
- Box office: $68,485

Alive and Kicking is a 2016 American documentary film about swing dancing, its origins in Harlem, and its rebirth starting in the 1990s. It is directed/produced by Susan Glatzer. The film premiered at the 2016 SXSW Film Festival and was subsequently acquired by Magnolia Pictures. The executive producers were Jason Blum and Robert Rippberger.

== Cast ==
- Dawn Hampton as herself
- Frankie Manning as himself
- Norma Miller as herself
- Rusty Frank as herself
- Sommer Gentry as herself
- Hilary Alexander as herself
- Chazz Young as himself
- Michael Jagger (dancer) as himself
- George Gee as himself
- Dorry Segev as herself
- Mary Murphy as herself
- Evita Arce as herself
- Kimberly Clever as herself
- Sharon Davis as herself
- Emelie DecaVita as herself
- Rebecka DecaVita as herself
- Augie Freeman as himself
- David Frutos as herself
- Andrea Gordon as herself
- John Paul Helveston as himself
- Jo Hoffberg as herself
- Barbara Allison Jone as herself
- Meschiya Lake as herself
- Sing Lim as herself
- Judy Pritchett as herself
- Chandrae Roettig as herself
- Stephen Sayer as himself
- Kevin St. Laurent as himself
- Erin Stevens as herself
- Tami Stevens as himself
- Krystina Torres as herself
- Jean Veloz as himself
- Lennart Westerlund as himself
- Chester A. Whitmore as himself
- Zoe The Wonder Dog as herself

== Reception ==
On review aggregator website Rotten Tomatoes, the film has an approval rating of 100 percent based on 11 critics, with an average rating of 7.50 out of 10.

Offering likeable characters and some killer footage of couples throwing each other around at high speed without mussing their hair, the documentary will please at fests and on TV while likely nudging more than a few sedentary viewers to go find dancing shoes of their own.

— The Hollywood Reporter

Both Sheri Linden of the Los Angeles Times and Christopher Kompanek of The Washington Post have praised writing and directing by Susan Glatzer.

Serena Donadoni of The Village Voice stated that "Although it's been used repeatedly as a movie title, Alive and Kicking perfectly captures the joyous enthusiasm of Susan Glatzer's debut documentary, which presents swing dance as a vibrant, living art form".

According to Moira MacDonald of the Seattle Times "Though it adheres to documentary convention by picking out a few competitive swing dancers and following them throughout the film, "Alive and Kicking" keeps dancing off into other areas, and we just hold its hand and follow".

While attending its premiere at the SXSW, Wayne Alan Brenner of The Austin Chronicle wrote "The music, the interviews, the interleavening of stock footage, the way the various modern narratives and backgrounding histories are fitted together: All of this works toward a successful expression of what means a thing because it does have that swing".
