= Robert Rippberger =

American film director and producer

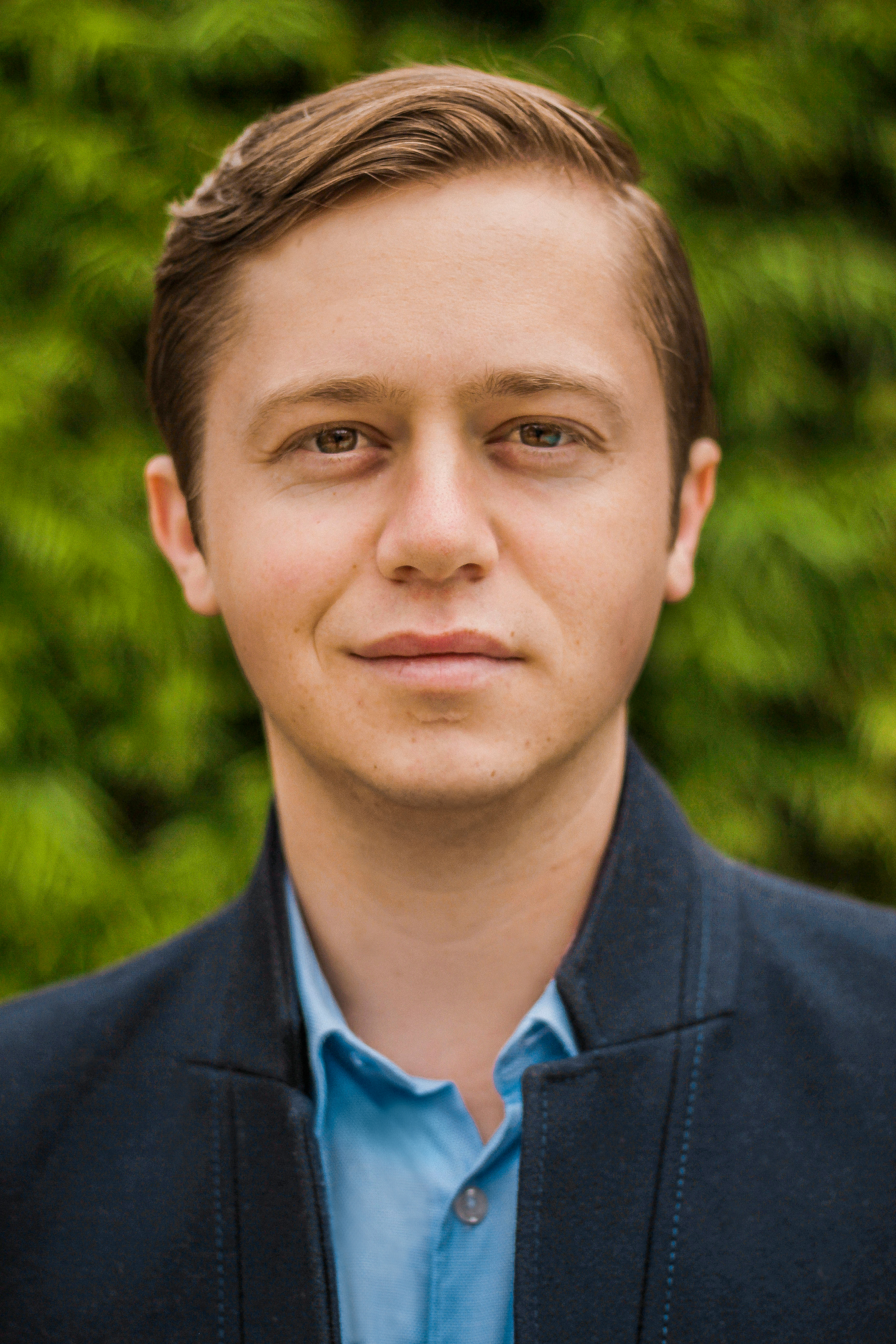
- Born: Boulder, Colorado
- Education: University of California, Berkeley
- Occupations: Film director, film producer, and screenwriter
- Years active: 2006–present
- Website: robertrippberger.com

Robert Rippberger is an American film director, film producer, and screenwriter. He is the director of the sci-fi movie, Renner, producer of The Inventor, writer/director of Those Who Walk Away (film) starring BooBoo Stewart, the director/producer of Strive with Oscar winner Danny Glover, the director of the feature documentary Public Enemy Number One (film) from Executive Producer Ice-T, and director/producer of the Hulu released documentary 7 Days in Syria. Robert executive produced with Jason Blum the feature documentary Alive and Kicking. The film was sold to Magnolia Pictures and Netflix after its debut at the 2016 SXSW Film Festival, where it received a Grand Jury nomination.

== Feature Films ==
For 2026, Rippberger is producing, directing, and editing the upcoming feature dramedy, A Good Fight, from Dan in Real Life scribe Pierce Gardner. The film stars Booboo Stewart, Aaron Kuban, and academy award nominee Abigail Breslin.

Rippberger directed and produced the sci-fi movie Renner, that was released February 2025 in theaters throughout the U.S. and on video-on-demand. The film stars Frankie Muniz, Violett Beane, and Academy Award Winner Marcia Gay Harden and is a futuristic AI thriller.

In 2023, Robert produced The Inventor which was released theatrically on September 23 by Blue Fox Entertainment, and then on VOD on November 7. The Inventor is a stop-motion feature film written and directed by Jim Capobianco, the Oscar-nominated writer of Pixar's Ratatouille. The film stars Marion Cotillard, Daisy Ridley, Stephen Fry and Matt Berry and is about the life of Leonardo da Vinci. The Inventor had its worldwide premier at the 2023 Annecy Film Festival and was also named one of the ten best animated films of 2023 by The Wrap.

In 2021, Rippberger wrote and directed the horror feature Those Who Walk Away starring Booboo Stewart. Like 1917 (film) the film was completed in one shot. It was lauded in The New York Times and on KTLA after its U.S. theatrical release.

Rippberger is the director of the 2019 drama Strive, about a girl from the projects in Harlem who works to attend Yale. Inspired by true stories, Strive stars Grammy-nominated JoiStaRR, Shaylin Becton, Ricky Flowers Jr, Chelsea Lee Williams, and Oscar winner Danny Glover, with music composed by Grammy-winning producer Warryn Campbell.

== Documentary ==
Rippberger recently produced 'How To Build A Truth Engine' which follows award-winning investigative journalists, fact-checkers, scientists and engineers in their efforts to develop groundbreaking technology and understanding of the human psyche to help bring societies back to a common understanding of reality. The film is executive produced by Academy Award winners George Clooney and Grant Heslov and will have its World Premiere at the 2024 SXSW Film Festival.

Rippberger is also currently producing 'The Mouse That Roared', directed by Academy Award nominee Judith Ehrlich.

In 2019, Rippberger directed and produced Public Enemy Number One (film)—a documentary about America's war on drugs from Executive Producer Ice-T. The film won Best Documentary Feature at the Seattle Film Festival, and Storyteller Award and Best Producer at Doc LA - Los Angeles Documentary Film Festival.

In 2016, Rippberger's feature documentary 7 Days in Syria, which follows journalist Janine di Giovanni's 2012 trip to Aleppo, was screened at Britain's House of Lords. The film has played in over 50 cities worldwide, on television in Denmark, Sweden, and China, and via streaming service Hulu. The documentary is currently available via Amazon Prime and other VOD providers. The film was well received by critics and personally championed by United Nations Special Envoy Angelina Jolie.

Rippberger went on to executive produce Alive and Kicking, a documentary about swing dancing, which premiered at the 2016 SXSW Film Festival to a Grand Jury nomination, and was released in 2017 by Magnolia Pictures. Alive and Kicking was named the film to watch by The New York Times watching section, received a 100% rating on Rotten Tomatoes, and was invited to be part of the 2018/19 American Film Showcase, the State Department's diplomacy through cinema program. The film is currently available on Netflix.

In 2011, Rippberger co-created a seven part documentary series published by The New York Times interviewing politicians and world leaders regarding the world's biggest crises. He was the 2012 recipient of the Dan Eldon Activist Award for producing and directing A Ride With Matt, later retitled Breaking the Cycle, a documentary feature about Huntington's Disease. The award is given to filmmakers for best use of media to effect positive change.

Rippberger is the previous president of I Imagine, a socially conscious technology and media organization that ran the I Imagine Film Festival in New York. He is also the co-founder and co-executive director of SIE Society whose mission is to create a central community with continuously relevant resources for social impact entertainment storytellers.

== Music videos ==
In 2014, Rippberger directed the music video Ab Laut Aa by EDM DJ Sanjoy featuring Sunidhi Chauhan. The video has 1.5 million views on YouTube and won Best Music Video that year at the VIMA Music Awards.

Thirty years after the song's initial release, in 2018 Rippberger directed the official music video for “Suicide” by Busy Bee Starski, the single off his gold album Running Thangs. Originating from New York City, Hip Hop Hall of Fame inductee Busy Bee Starski is considered one of the founders of modern hip-hop, and the star of the 1983 film Wild Style, billed as the first hip-hop motion picture. The music video guest stars rapper Ice-T.

== Writing ==
In 2022, Rippberger published, The Power of Storytelling: Social Impact Entertainment about the role film and TV has in society. The non-fiction book was published by Regent Press October 25, 2022.

In 2014, Rippberger published a novel called Escape to Anywhere Else with a foreword by Mariel Hemingway.

Robert was the co-founder and co-editor of the magazine and podcast, Cinema of Change, along with Tobias Deml; since rebranded as SIE Magazine. He was previously a contributing writer to The Huffington Post.

== Early life ==
Rippberger began filmmaking at age 13. As a freshman in high school, he enrolled in filmmaking classes at the University of Colorado Boulder, studied under directing teacher Judith Weston, and at UCLA Film School in Los Angeles. In 2005, at age 16, he made his first feature film, "The Hoodwink."

Rippberger received a B.A. in philosophy from the University of California, Berkeley in 2010, where he was awarded in 2009 the Roselyn Schneider Eisner Prize for his film "In the Middle." It is the highest award given for creativity on the UC, Berkeley campus.

== Filmography ==
=== Features ===
- The Hoodwink (2006)
- Visions for the Future (2013)
- Breaking the Cycle (2013)
- Face of Unity: Nelson Mandela (2014)
- 7 Days in Syria (2015)
- Alive and Kicking (2016) (executive producer)
- Strive (2019)
- Public Enemy Number One (2019)
- Those Who Walk Away (2022)
- Our Son (2023) (executive producer)
- The Inventor (2023 film) (producer, p.g.a.)
- How to Build a Truth Engine (2024) (producer)
- Renner (2025)
- A Good Fight (2026)

=== Shorts ===
- "Grave" (2004)
- "R.I.P." (2005)
- "In the Middle" (2009)
- "Noor (2011)" (co-director)
- "Haven (2011)"
- "ThinkingAloud" (2011)
- "A Night at the Office" (2012) (co-producer)
- "Duplicitous Minds" (2022)

=== Music videos ===
- "Ab Laut Aa" by Sanjoy featuring Sunidhi Chauhan (2013)
- "Set Me Free" by Sanjoy (2014)
- "Suicide" by Busy Bee Starski (2018)

== Awards and nominations ==
Year	Award	Nominated Work	Category	Role	Result
2011	The Eisner Prize	In the Middle	Highest Achievement in Creativity	Director/Producer	Won
2012	Dan Eldon Activist Award	Breaking the Cycle	Activist Filmmaker Award	Director/Producer	Won
2015	Fingal Film Festival	7 Days in Syria	Outstanding Achievement in Media	Director/Producer	Won
2016	Amsterdam Lift-Off Festival	7 Days in Syria	Jury Selection Best Feature	Director/Producer	Won
2016	SXSW Film Festival	Alive and Kicking	Grand Jury Award	Executive Producer	Nominated
2017	Palm Springs Film Festival	Alive and Kicking	Best of Fest	Executive Producer	Won
2019	Harlem International Film Festival	Strive	Audience Award	Director/Producer	Won
2019	American Black Film Festival	Strive	Audience Award	Director/Producer	Nominated
2019	American Black Film Festival	Strive	Best Screenplay	Director/Producer	Won
2019	The Valley Film Festival	Strive	10 Degrees Hotter Award: Best Narrative Feature	Director/Producer	Won
2019	Awareness Film Festival	Strive	Audience Award	Director/Producer	Won
2020	New Jersey International Film Festival	Strive	Best Feature Film	Director/Producer	Won
2019	DOCLA	Public Enemy Number One	Storyteller Award	Director/Producer	Won
2019	DOCLA	Public Enemy Number One	Best Producer	Director/Producer	Won
2020	American Black Film Festival	Public Enemy Number One	Grand Jury Prize, Best Documentary	Director/Producer	Nominated
2020	Seattle Film Festival	Public Enemy Number One	Best Documentary Feature	Director/Producer	Won
2022	International Motion Picture Awards	Duplicitous Minds	Best Director	Director	Won
2022	Canadian Cinematography Awards	Duplicitous Minds	Best Director	Director	Won
2023	Annie Awards	The Inventor	Best Feature—Independent	Producer	Nominated
2023	Annecy International Animation Film Festival	The Inventor	Feature Films	Producer	Nominated

== Books ==
- Rippberger, Robert (2014). Escape to Anywhere Else. ISBN 978-1587902680.
- The Power of Storytelling: Social Impact Entertainment. Regent Press. 2022. ISBN 978-1-58790-601-5.
