= Matthew VanDyke =

American military advisor and filmmaker

- Born: June 11, 1979 (age 47); Baltimore, Maryland, U.S.
- Other name: Matt VanDyke
- Education: University of Maryland, Baltimore County; Georgetown University
- Organizations: Sons of Liberty International; National Liberation Army; Armed Forces of Ukraine
- Notable work: Point and Shoot; Not Anymore: A Story of Revolution; Jim: The James Foley Story; 7 Days in Syria
- Website: matthewvandyke.com

Matthew VanDyke (born June 11, 1979) is an American international security analyst, foreign fighter, media personality, documentary filmmaker, and founder of the controversial non-profit organization Sons of Liberty International (SOLI). He first gained fame during the Libyan Civil War as a foreign fighter on the side of the uprising against Muammar Gaddafi and as a prisoner of war.

As a journalist and documentary filmmaker, VanDyke traveled throughout North Africa and the Middle East by motorcycle from 2007 to 2011. His experiences and observations during these four years led him to join the Libyan Civil War as a rebel fighter. VanDyke has publicly supported revolutions in the Middle East, and North Africa, and has worked as a filmmaker in the Syrian Civil War and fought as an armed combatant.

In 2014, he founded Sons of Liberty International (SOLI), a 501(c)(3) organization that provides military training, advising, and supplies to forces fighting against authoritarian regimes and terrorists.

VanDyke and his organization have been working in Ukraine since March 2022, helping the Ukrainian military in their fight against Russia in the Russo-Ukrainian War.

In addition to SOLI's mission, VanDyke enlisted in the Armed Forces of Ukraine to fight as a combatant in the war against Russia.

== Early life and education ==
VanDyke attended the private schools Calvert School and Gilman School in Baltimore.

In 2002, VanDyke received his bachelor's degree in political science from the University of Maryland, Baltimore County, graduating summa cum laude.

VanDyke studied in the Security Studies Program (SSP) at Georgetown University's Walsh School of Foreign Service from 2002 to 2004. He received his master's degree in Security Studies with a Middle East regional concentration in 2004. As a graduate student at Georgetown University he wrote a political column for the campus newspaper, The Hoya, and co-hosted a radio talk show on the Georgetown University radio station, WGTB.

VanDyke is a member of Mensa, a social organization for people in the top 2% of intelligence as measured by an IQ test entrance exam.

His desire to see the Arab World for himself led him to supplement his academic pursuits with two long introspective journeys that would fundamentally change the way he viewed himself and the Arab World. The first expedition from 2007 to 2009 was a solo trip through North Africa and the Middle East on a Kawasaki KLR650 motorcycle that included journeys in Morocco, Mauritania, Tunisia, Libya, Egypt, Jordan, and Syria. This was followed in 2010 by a six-month motorcycle trek from Iraq, through Iran, to Afghanistan. For the latter, he traveled with his friend American photographer Daniel Britt, with the final goal of spending a few weeks embedded to film the US military in Afghanistan.

VanDyke made several close friends in Tripoli, Libya in 2008; those friendships were instrumental in making his decision to fight in the Libyan Civil War in 2011. VanDyke lived in Iraq later in 2008 and 2009, teaching English at a University to fund his motorcycle journey. He also filmed the US military in Iraq and briefly worked as a war correspondent.

VanDyke filmed his motorcycle journeys from 2007 to 2010, and some of the footage was used in the feature documentary about VanDyke, Point and Shoot, which won the Best Documentary Award at the Tribeca Film Festival in 2014.

== Libyan Civil War ==
In February 2011, the Libyan Civil War began, and VanDyke was in contact with several of his Libyan friends in Tripoli via email and Facebook. "My friends were telling me about family members being arrested or disappearing or being injured. They would say to me things like, 'Why doesn’t anybody help us?' So I said I would be there."

VanDyke went to Libya with the intention of joining the rebel force opposing the government of Muammar Gaddafi. At the time, there was no international military support for the rebels, and it appeared that NATO would not intervene. Gaddafi had air superiority and his military was significantly stronger than the rebel force. "I knew that they needed people to go fight. There was no NATO at that time. It didn't look like there would be NATO involvement or foreign involvement. It was a very, very desperate situation of Gaddafi's army moving towards Benghazi, and it was an all or nothing situation."

=== Prisoner of war ===
On 13 March 2011, VanDyke was struck on the head during an ambush in Brega and lost his memory of what happened. VanDyke regained consciousness briefly during his transport from Brega to a prison, which he believes was in Sirte. He was interrogated and told he would never see America again.

Sometime within the next 24–48 hours VanDyke was flown to Tripoli, where he was imprisoned in the Maktab al-Nasser prison in the Abu Salim district of Tripoli. VanDyke was held in solitary confinement, in a 1.2m x 2.2m (4 ft x 7 ft) cell with a small skylight in the ceiling. He was fed and allowed to use the toilet three times a day, but was not allowed outside or given anything to read or other materials.

After 85 days, VanDyke was blindfolded, handcuffed, and transported to Abu Salim prison, where he would spend the next 81 days, also in solitary confinement. The psychological torture of the solitary confinement was made worse by VanDyke's obsessive-compulsive disorder. Prisoners broke the lock off his cell on August 24, 2011, and he escaped prison. Free from prison, VanDyke stayed at the home of a fellow escapee for a few days before relocating to the Corinthia Hotel Tripoli as a guest of the National Transitional Council, and spoke to reporters about his experience as a prisoner of war.

=== International media coverage ===
Shortly after his capture was reported, he was incorrectly described by the media as a freelance journalist. Several non-governmental organizations (NGOs), including the Committee to Protect Journalists, attempted to pressure the Gaddafi government on his behalf. On May 25, Deputy Libyan Foreign Minister Khaled Kaim said he had no information about VanDyke. In early August, after nearly five months of denials, the Gaddafi government finally admitted that VanDyke was in custody, but would not allow anyone to speak with or visit him, and would not reveal which prison he was being held in. Human Rights Watch visited Abu Salim prison and asked if VanDyke was being held there. Prison officials denied that he was there, when in fact he was.

Following his escape from prison, VanDyke stated that he would not leave Libya until the country was free and all cities were liberated from Gaddafi's forces. He also committed to not leaving until all rebel Prisoners of War (POWs) being held by Gaddafi forces were rescued from prison, including the three rebel fighters he was captured with. He honored both commitments, remaining in Libya and fighting in the war, and not leaving Libya until Gaddafi was defeated and all prisoners of war were freed.

VanDyke has been compared to foreign fighters of the International Brigades during the Spanish Civil War. He appears regularly in the media as a media personality and media commentator.

=== Joining the National Liberation Army ===
VanDyke and a Libyan friend, Nouri Fonas, went to Ra's Lanuf, meeting with the commander of the Ali Hassan al-Jaber Brigade, who allowed them to enlist in the National Liberation Army.

VanDyke remained on or near the front lines as the rebels advanced from Harawa to Sirte. At the Battle of Sirte he took part in heavy fighting on the eastern front, most notably near Jazeera, Sirte Hotel, Sirte University, Dubai Street, and the Emirates apartment complex, as well as other engagements. During this time, VanDyke used a variety of weapons in combat and served in a variety of roles, but was primarily a DShK (Dushka) gunner. When not in combat, Fonas and VanDyke often gave tours of the battlefield to journalists and assisted the international press to help them safely and reliably report on the Battle of Sirte. During one such mission, they escorted CBS News correspondent Allen Pizzey and his crew to the front lines in Sirte, at which time VanDyke was filmed in combat. This was aired on the CBS Evening News in the United States, and was the first combat footage of VanDyke to emerge. Additional footage of him fighting in Sirte would later be made public in American television broadcasts and online.

== Career ==
=== Sons of Liberty International ===
VanDyke founded the non-profit organization Sons of Liberty International (SOLI) in 2014. The 501(c)(3) organization provides military training, advising, and supplies to forces fighting against authoritarian regimes and terrorists.

During the revolution in Libya in 2011, VanDyke became friends with American journalist James Foley and British journalist John Cantlie. The following year, he was with them in Syria in the weeks before they were kidnapped by a militant Islamist group in November 2012.

In August 2014, James Foley was beheaded in a video released by ISIS. Another ISIS video was released two weeks later showing the beheading of American journalist Steven Sotloff, who VanDyke had also become friends with in Libya and who had been kidnapped in Syria in 2013.

After the murder of his friends, VanDyke founded Sons of Liberty International with the first mission being to train forces fighting against ISIS.

Sons of Liberty International's first mission was training and advising the Nineveh Plain Protection Units (NPU), an Assyrian military force fighting against ISIS in Iraq from 2014-2017. VanDyke worked closely with the NPU's commander General Behnam Aboosh, training the first group of soldiers in secret before expanding the training to a battalion of 300 with the approval of the Kurdistan Regional Government (KRG).

In 2016, SOLI also began training and advising the Nineveh Plain Forces (NPF), another Assyrian force that was fighting against ISIS.

On May 3, 2016, ISIS launched a surprise attack on Teleskof with around 125 fighters and 20 technical vehicles, capturing the town where SOLI was living and working while training the NPF. SOLI, the NPF, the NPU, Peshmerga, and a Quick Reaction Force (QRF) of Navy SEALs fought to recapture it from ISIS later that day.

In 2018, SOLI trained and advised a counter-terrorism force in the Philippines that was formed to defend against attacks by ISIS.

In March 2022, SOLI began training, advising, and supplying Ukrainian military forces after the Russian invasion of Ukraine. They expanded in 2023 to include a demining program, finding and removing Russian landmines and unexploded ordnance in eastern Ukraine, and in 2024 began developing innovations for use on the battlefield.

While leading SOLI in Ukraine, VanDyke also enlisted in the Armed Forces of Ukraine to fight as a combatant in the war against Russia.

In 2025, VanDyke revealed that he had secretly been running covert operations with Venezuelan rebels since 2019 to overthrow the regime of Nicolás Maduro.

== Media Coverage ==
VanDyke has been the subject of extensive media coverage, becoming a media personality who appears regularly on television, radio and podcasts.

VanDyke was the subject of a feature article in Maxim magazine titled "Exclusive Report: Meet the American Taking the Fight to ISIS."

VanDyke's experiences as a prisoner of war in Libya were the subject of an episode of the television show Locked Up Abroad.

In 2016, the History Channel released seven episodes of their HistoryNow series about VanDyke's leadership of Sons of Liberty International.

VanDyke has been featured in reporting by The New York Times, The Washington Post, USA Today, The Guardian, The Times (UK), Newsweek and many other newspapers, magazines and websites.

He has appeared as a guest on many television, radio, and podcast programs and is an international security and foreign affairs analyst on numerous networks discussing current events in a variety of subject areas.

== Arrest ==
In March 2026, India's National Investigation Agency (NIA) arrested VanDyke in Kolkata, accusing him of participating in carrying out terrorist activities linked to drone operations. According to documents submitted by the NIA before a court in Delhi, VanDyke was among seven foreign nationals arrested, including six Ukrainian nationals.

The agency alleged that the accused were involved in the procurement and transfer of drone consignments from Europe, which were reportedly delivered to groups operating in India's northeastern region and across the border in Myanmar.

According to the NIA's First Information Report (FIR), some of the accused had entered India on tourist visas and travelled to states such as Assam and Mizoram, a state that is illegal for foreigners to travel without a Protected Area Permit (PAP), and before allegedly crossing into Myanmar without required permits. The agency further alleged that they conducted training related to drone operations for Myanmar-based ethnic armed groups, which it claims have links to insurgent organizations in Northeast India.

The accused were booked under provisions of India's Unlawful Activities (Prevention) Act (UAPA), including charges related to participation in a terrorist conspiracy. As of March 2026, the investigation was ongoing, with the NIA seeking further custody to determine the full extent of the alleged network, including funding sources, operational routes, and additional associates.

According to anonymous defence figures who provided information to The Print, VanDyke previously traveled through India to enter Chin State in 2025. Data seized from electronic devices (including drones) recorded training of ethnic Chin groups in Myanmar. It said that as many as 14 Ukrainians had entered India on tourist visas on different dates and travelled by air to Assam's Guwahati. From there, they allegedly travelled to Mizoram without the mandatory Restricted Area Permit (RAP) or Protected Area Permit (PAP). They subsequently entered Myanmar illegally to undergo pre-scheduled training in drone warfare, drone operations, assembly and jamming technology. The training was intended for Myanmar-based Ethnic Armed Groups (EAGs) targeting the country's military junta, the federal agency claimed.

In September 2026, the NIA dropped all terror charges against VanDyke and the 6 other Ukrainian nationals. They instead charged him under Sections 21 and 23 of the Immigration and Foreigners Act, which dealt with violations of entry and movement of foreigners, far lighter charges. The spokesperson for the Ministry of External Affairs (MEA) Randhir Jaiswal when questioned simply stated it was a "legal matter". The NIA also stated that it will continue its investigation into VanDyke's links with Myanmar-based militants.

VanDyke and all the other accused were released on bail on September 24 and allowed to travel to their home countries for a month, which was later extended till February 24, 2027. His release was criticized by Indian opposition Congress with its leader Jairam Ramesh asking "Obviously US pressure determined this outcome, but what did India get in return?"

On 9 November, 2026 VanDyke claimed that he was arrested by India as part of "Russia's war against Ukraine." He added "I will reveal shocking details about this story over the next few months, in both posts and media interviews."

== Filmography ==
- Not Anymore: A Story of Revolution (2013)
- Point and Shoot (2014)
- 7 Days in Syria (2015)

=== Not Anymore: A Story of Revolution ===
Upon returning to the United States from Libya at the end of 2011, VanDyke was asked by the press at the airport about his future plans. He stated that he would be working in other revolutions, including likely participation as an armed combatant at some point in the future. In 2012, VanDyke began preparations to make a short documentary film, Not Anymore: A Story of Revolution, to help improve world opinion of the Syrian rebel forces in the Syrian Civil War and encourage the international community to support them. VanDyke has stated that his decision to film instead of fight at that stage of the war was based on equipment shortages among the rebels, a problem that he felt his film could help address by increasing international support. He self-financed the film with his own money, spending approximately $30,000.

VanDyke traveled to Syria in October 2012 and filmed for around a month in the city of Aleppo. Filming in Aleppo was dangerous because of artillery barrages, aircraft attacks, snipers, and the threat of kidnapping because of VanDyke's status as a public figure. While in Syria making Not Anymore: A Story of Revolution, the Syrian government broadcast on numerous Syrian State Television channels that VanDyke was a terrorist who had come to fight against the government as part of the rebel Free Syrian Army, greatly increasing the risk that VanDyke would be kidnapped or assassinated in Syria.

Not Anymore: A Story of Revolution was released in September 2013. It was broadcast on television by ARD in Germany, SBS in Australia, and NRK in Norway. Footage from the film was also shown as part of a 2013 episode of ABC's program Nightline. VanDyke released Not Anymore: A Story of Revolution on YouTube without advertising. The film is also available online through The Guardian's Comment is Free subsite. Not Anymore: A Story of Revolution has also been shown at educational institutions and events around the world sponsored by organizations such as Amnesty International and The Frontline Club.

The film was described by NewFilmmakers LA Film Festival as "a film festival darling". The film has won over 100 awards, including the Short Film Award at the One World Media Awards, and First Place (Non Fiction) in the 36th Annual National Short Film Competition at the USA Film Festival as well as taking Best Film for the 2013 ITSA Film Festival.

=== Point and Shoot ===
VanDyke was the subject of Point and Shoot, a documentary film written and directed by Academy Award winner Marshall Curry. VanDyke had approached Curry to collaborate on a biographical film about VanDyke using footage he had shot during the motorcycle journey and while fighting in Libya. The film combines VanDyke's footage from 2007 to 2011, with interviews and an animation sequence that recreates VanDyke's experience in solitary confinement as a prisoner of war.

Point and Shoot follows VanDyke's four year motorcycle journey, his friendship with Nouri Fonas and other Libyans, and his transformation into a revolutionary during the conflict in Libya. The film explores VanDyke's background, motivations, and the formative experiences during his motorcycle journey that led to his transformation into a revolutionary during the conflict in Libya.

Point and Shoot premiered at Tribeca Film Festival in April 2014 where it won the Best Documentary Award. The film also won the Independent Film Festival of Boston Special Jury Prize for Documentary Feature and VanDyke was awarded the Special Jury Award for Extraordinary Courage in Filmmaking by the Little Rock Film Festival for his work as producer and cinematographer on Point and Shoot.

The film has a 72% positive rating on Rotten Tomatoes. and a positive Metascore of 65 on Metacritic.

=== 7 Days in Syria ===
VanDyke was a cinematographer and producer of the 2015 documentary 7 Days in Syria directed by Robert Rippberger and produced by Scott Rosenfelt, following lauded journalist Janine di Giovanni. The film showed at three dozen festivals, including a private screening to Britain's House of Lords and to senior members of the United Nations, before it was released by Ro*co Films and Film Buff.
