= Joi Campbell =

American musical artist

- Born: Joi Nicole Campbell; April 2, 1979 (age 46); Los Angeles, California, United States
- Occupation(s): Songwriter, singer, actress
- Relatives: Warryn Campbell Jr. (brother); Erica Campbell (sister-in-law)

Joi Nicole Campbell (born April 2, 1979), also known under her stage JoiStaRR, is an American singer, songwriter, and actress.

== Early life ==
Campbell is the daughter of Warryn and Sandra Campbell. Her older brother is music producer Warryn Campbell Jr. Campbell's singing career began in church choirs in the Los Angeles area. Witnessing her brother success as a songwriter and producer, she started writing songs herself, and though she began studying to become a doctor, Campbell eventually decided to pursue a career in music instead.

== Career ==
In the early 2000s, Campbell was able to make herself a name as a professional songwriter. Alongside her brother, she wrote for several gospel and R&B artists, including singers Brandy, Toni Estes, Mario, Christina Milian, Angie Stone, and Tamia. In 2002, she planned to embark on a singing career, with several promotional singles such as "Watch Me", "Keep It Movin'", and "Everything" featuring rapper Jadakiss issued, first through J Records and later through her brothers My Block Records label, but a planned debut album failed to materialize.

In 2006, Campbell received her first Grammy Award nod when "Heaven" from Mary Mary's self-titled third studio album was nominated for Best Gospel Song at the 48th awards ceremony. In 2008, she accompanied rapper Kanye West as a background singer on his Glow in the Dark Tour. She was invited by West to join him on his planned Fame Kills tour co-headlining with Lady Gaga but it was canceled after public controversy regarding West's interruption of Taylor Swift's Best Female Video speech at the 2009 MTV Video Music Awards. Following a longer hiatus during which she ventured into real estate, Campbell released her first EP, Art & Beat, in 2013, through Warryn's My Block Inc. and eOne Music.

In 2018, she appeared in the TV One reality show We're the Campbells, starring her brother and his wife, Mary Mary singer Erica Campbell. In 2019, she launched her acting career, starring in director Robert Rippberger's independent coming-of-age drama film Strive alongside Danny Glover.

== Discography ==
=== Extended plays ===
List of extended plays
Title	Album details
Art & Beat	Released: April 2, 2013; Label: My Block Inc., eOne Music; Formats: Digital download

=== Singles ===
- "Nothing Even Matters" (featuring PJ Morton) (2017)
- "Cocoa Butter" (2018)
- "Valentine's Day" (2021)
- "The Door" (2021)
- "Parachute" (2021)
- "Seven 7s" (2021)
- "Black Friday" (2021)
- "Love Story" (2022)

== Filmography ==
- Strive (2019)
