= Public Enemy Number One (film) =

2019 film

- Directed by: Robert Rippberger
- Produced by: Robert Rippberger; Chris Chiari; Ice-T
- Starring: Ice-T; Ethan Nadlemann; Dan Baum
- Cinematography: Robert Rippberger
- Edited by: Gabriel Cullen
- Music by: Rony Barrak
- Production companies: Aletheia Films, King of Quality
- Release date: October 19, 2019
- Running time: 70 minutes
- Country: United States
- Language: English

Public Enemy Number One is a 2019 American documentary film directed by Robert Rippberger and produced by Rippberger, Chris Chiari, and Ice-T. It looks at the war on drugs from 1968 until today and looks at trigger points in history that took cannabis from being a somewhat benign criminal activity into a self-perpetuating constantly expanding policy disaster. The film won Best Documentary Feature at the Seattle Film Festival, and Storyteller Award and Best Producer at Doc LA - Los Angeles Documentary Film Festival. It was released on various over-the-top media services after a limited theatrical release.

== Synopsis ==
Public Enemy Number One sheds light on the politics behind the war on drugs from Nixon to today, with first of its kind insight from U.S. Drug Czars, and the founders of the "Just Say No" movement.

== Reception ==
" Public Enemy Number One is required viewing for anyone wanting to engage in an honest conversation about public policy regarding drugs."

— Alan Ng

"Director Robert Rippberger does an excellent job in not having to rely on making this film too long, but with the combination of interviews and clips, a perfect straightforward and to the point history on the policy and its effects in past, present, and future."

— WorldFilmGeek

"It’s an eye-opening experience and as any high-quality documentary should, presents a compelling need to better understand more. Highly recommended."

— David Duprey
