= The Inventor (2023 film) =

Animated film by Jim Capobianco

- Theatrical release poster
- Directed by: Jim Capobianco
- Written by: Jim Capobianco
- Produced by: Jim Capobianco; Ellen Byrne; Robert Rippberger; Vincent Mc Carthy; Ilan Urroz
- Starring: Stephen Fry; Marion Cotillard; Daisy Ridley; Matt Berry
- Cinematography: Marijke Van Kets
- Edited by: Nicolas Flory
- Music by: Alex Mandel
- Production companies: Curiosity Studio; Foliascope; Leo & King
- Distributed by: KMBO (France); Blue Fox Entertainment (United States); Park Circus (Ireland and United Kingdom)
- Release dates: 12 June 2023 (Annecy); 15 September 2023 (United States); 31 January 2024 (France)
- Running time: 100 minutes
- Countries: United States; France; Ireland
- Language: English
- Budget: $10 million
- Box office: $2.1 million

The Inventor is a 2023 stop-motion/2D animation biographical film about Italian polymath Leonardo da Vinci, written, produced and directed by Jim Capobianco and co-directed by Pierre-Luc Granjon. The voice cast includes Stephen Fry, Marion Cotillard, Daisy Ridley, and Matt Berry. The Inventor is a co-production between the United States, France, and Ireland.

The film had its world premiere in official competition at the Annecy International Animation Film Festival on 12 June 2023. Blue Fox Entertainment released the film in the United States on 15 September 2023, while KMBO released the film theatrically in France on 31 January 2024.

== Plot ==
The film starts off in Rome, Italy 1516, where Leonardo da Vinci is using a 'telescope', made out of a mirror contraption, to examine the Moon's features in order to find if there was indeed life and seas on its surface. Leonardo is followed by members of the Papal Court into the room where Zoroastro reveals a human body for scientific probing, to search for the answer to life itself and the soul. The Pope is informed of this and orders Leonardo to cease further investigation into God's works.

A soldier informs the Pope of the defeat of the army and their Milanese allies at Marignano and appoints Leonardo as a military engineer; however, his career is short-lived as he persuades the Pope to make peace with the French king, Francis I. Leonardo shows Francis his inventions and Francis decides to invite Leonardo to the royal court.

Leonardo arrives in Amboise, and Francis orders Leonardo and his assistant, Cecco, to visit the under-construction castle in Remorantin, where he first meets Marguerite. Being away from the Pope, Leonardo continues his search for the soul and is confronted by Death. Leonardo explains his findings to Marguerite and she intends to help him in his research. Marguerite helps Leonardo build his 'Ideal City' instead of the castle which Francis had in mind.

As Francis prepares for the festivities to which he has invited Emperor Charles V and King Henry VIII, Leonardo is forced to stop designing his Ideal City and works on inventions that Francis can show off to the other kings (including military devices and an equestrian statue of Francis).

Leonardo falls ill and is visited by the Papal Court, he decides to show them his research on the soul; however, Cecco disagrees with Leonardo's decision. As he is lying in bed he claims that he has discovered the "Secret to Life itself".

Leonardo stages a show on the Solar System (with the Sun played by Francis in person) and the understanding of the Universe. A song called "A Life well spent is long" is interpreted and Leonardo flies into what appears to be the Milky Way may suggest his death.

== Voice cast ==
- Stephen Fry as Leonardo da Vinci
- Matt Berry as the Pope
- Daisy Ridley as Marguerite de Navarre
- Marion Cotillard as Louise of Savoy
- Natalie Palamides as Nepveu / Antonio de Beatis
- Jim Capobianco as Luigi d'Aragona
- Ben Stranahan as Page
- Gauthier Battoue as Francis I of France
- Max Baumgarten as Il Boccador / Charles V, Holy Roman Emperor
- Jane Osborn as Gravedigger Jane
- John Gilkey as Gravedigger John / Giuliano
- Angelino Sandri as Cecco
- Daniel Swan as Henry VIII

== Production ==
=== Development ===
On 12 April 2018, Variety reported that the Academy Award-nominee screenwriter of Ratatouille (2007), Jim Capobianco, and producer Robert Rippberger were producing The Inventor, a stop-motion adventure film about the life of Leonardo da Vinci, which is a continuation of Capobianco's 2009 short film, Leonardo. On 2 May 2018, Capobianco said in an interview with Flickering Myth that The Inventor would focus on the end of Leonardo da Vinci's life where he moved to France.

On 19 June 2020, Deadline reported that comedian Stephen Fry would voice Leonardo da Vinci, and actress Daisy Ridley would voice French Princess Marguerite. The animation team also includes HeFang Wei as the film's 2D animation director, Tomm Moore as 2D animation consultant, Nicolas Flory as 2D supervisor, and Fabrice Faivre as the VFX supervisor. Alex Mandel composed the score. Shooting was scheduled to start in August 2021 with a release date set for Spring 2023. The film is a European and American coproduction from Foliascope (France), Curiosity Studio (Ireland), and Leo & King (United States). mk2 films is handling the film's international sales, while The Exchange handles sales in the United States.

On 11 September 2020, Variety reported that Marion Cotillard and Matt Berry had joined the cast and would voice Queen Louise of Savoy and Pope Leo X, respectively. On 23 April 2021, it was announced that triple Oscar nominee Tomm Moore had joined the film's creative team and would handle the 2D sequences along with his frequent collaborator Fabian Erlinghäuser. The screenplay was written by Jim Capobianco, who co-directed the film with Pierre-Luc Granjon. The film is an independent production with an estimated budget of $10 million.

In June 2022, a 25-minute footage of the film was screened at the Annecy International Animation Film Festival in France at the festival's work-in-progress section in a sold-out session.

=== Filming ===
Production began on 14 February 2022 at the Foliascope Studio in Saint-Péray in France. On 19 February 2022, composer Alex Mandel wrote on his Twitter account that Marion Cotillard sings one of his songs in The Inventor. On 17 July 2022, French newspaper Le Dauphiné Libéré revealed behind the scenes images from the set. Shooting wrapped on 16 December 2022. The first scoring session with composer Alex Mandel and the Budapest Scoring Orchestra was conducted fully remotely on 16 January 2023. Post-production wrapped on 13 May 2023.

== Release ==
In April 2022, Variety reported that the film had been pre-sold to several countries, such as France, Portugal, Hong Kong, Taiwan, Philippines, Former Yugoslavia, the U.K., German-speaking Europe, Greece, Italy, Scandinavia, Spain, Switzerland, Turkey, Israel, South Africa, Australia, New Zealand, India, Latin America, the Middle East and Indonesia. A work-in-progress screening of the film was shown at the Brussels International Animation Film Festival in February 2023.

The film had its world premiere in official competition at the Annecy International Animation Film Festival on 12 June 2023. KMBO released the film theatrically in France on 31 January 2024. Universal Pictures holds rights in several international territories. In July 2023, Blue Fox Entertainment acquired United States distribution rights and set a release date for 25 August 2023, but it was later pushed back to 15 September 2023.

== Reception ==
On the review aggregator website Rotten Tomatoes, 75% of 52 critics' reviews are positive, with an average rating of 6.5/10. The website's consensus reads: "A beautifully animated history lesson, The Inventor seems somewhat uncertain as to which audience it's trying to reach, but it remains amusing and often engaging." Metacritic, which uses a weighted average, assigned the film a score of 66 out of 100, based on 10 critics, indicating "generally favorable" reviews.

Le Parisien found that Capobianco put "magnificent drawings and delightful visual discoveries at the service of a fascinating story." The film received various positive reviews praising its visual charms and innovations. In her review for The Guardian, Cath Clarke, however, found the film "storyless". Other reviews insisted the film may be too ambitious for young children, Common Sense Media stating for example, "The movie celebrates curiosity and the power of ideas and imagination, but the sheer amount of information in the movie (and the mix of different animation styles) may make it hard for younger viewers to fully engage."

=== Accolades ===
Award / Film Festival	Date of ceremony	Category	Recipient(s)	Result	Ref(s)
Annecy International Animation Film Festival	17 June 2023	Best Feature Film	Jim Capobianco and Pierre-Luc Granjon	Nominated	
Annie Awards	17 February 2024	Best Animated Feature – Independent	The Inventor	Nominated	

== See also ==
- Cultural references to Leonardo da Vinci
