= Strive (film) =

2019 American urban youth film starring Danny Glover

- Film poster
- Directed by: Robert Rippberger
- Screenplay by: Piper Dellums; Sha-Risse Smith
- Story by: Sha-Risse Smith
- Produced by: Scott Rosenfelt; Tobias Deml; Ace Salvador; Hiroki Kamada; Robert Rippberger; Piper Dellums; Habib Paracha
- Starring: Danny Glover; JoiStaRR; Chelsea Lee Williams; Shaylin Becton; Ricky Flowers Jr.
- Cinematography: Dominick Sivilli
- Edited by: Gabriel Cullen
- Music by: Warryn Campbell
- Production companies: Aletheia Films; Prodigium Pictures
- Release date: May 19, 2019 (Harlem)
- Running time: 82 minutes
- Country: United States
- Language: English

Strive is a 2019 American independent coming-of-age drama film. Set in Harlem, the film tells the story of Kalani Johnson (JoiStaRR), a driven 18-year-old high school student who dreams of getting accepted into Yale University while facing the challenging life in the projects and streets of Harlem - with her only ally being college counselor Mr. Rose (Danny Glover).

The film premiered at the Harlem International Film Festival in May 2019. In June 2019, it screened in competition at the American Black Film Festival in Miami, and won the Jury Award for "Best Screenplay".

== Cast ==
- JoiStaRR as Kalani Johnson
- Danny Glover as Mr. Rose
- Shaylin Becton as Bebe Johnson
- Ricky Flowers Jr. as Jacob Johnson
- Chelsea Lee Wiliams as Grace Johnson
- Warryn Campbell as The Pastor
- Tony D. Head as Mr. Stokes

== Production ==
Pre-production for the film began at Aletheia Films and Prodigium Pictures in early 2017. Writer Sha-Risse Smith set out to make an inspirational film: "I wish I had a film like this when I was going to boarding school. [...] I want people to watch this and say, if Kalani can do this I can too." Glover joined the film in pre-production as Mr. Rose, a pivotal character for the film.

Strive was shot on location in Harlem later that summer, hiring cast and crew that was mostly New York City-based. The events of the film loosely take place around the housing projects of the Polo Grounds Towers in Coogan's Bluff. The namesake for the film is Striver's Row. Filming took place in and around both of these locations. Residents and community leaders of Harlem were consulted to the choice of locations and depictions of characters.

Post-production happened in Los Angeles, with Company 3 providing the coloring of the film. Campbell composed the music for the film, while JoiStaRR sang the closing song of the film.

== Reception ==
"While the independent film scene is not lacking for human interest stories, Strive finds a place all its own, Rippberger able to balance the uplifting themes well among the more harrowing setbacks of a young woman’s life. Led by a deeply personal performance, the takeaway in all this is less about the broader strokes of a story filled with many affecting moments but more so the smaller intimate highlights that pull us into Kalani’s tiny corner, where we all feel part of what it means to be alive. Highly recommended."

— David Duprey

"Strive isn't a feel-good film but it's a real film. It's relatable to a lot of people who have to pick and choose their loyalties when it comes to family, friends and themselves. Sometimes being selfish is the most selfless thing one can do."

— Erika Hardison

=== Accolades ===
Strive received the Audience Award, while JoiStaRR received the Best Actress Award at the Harlem International Film Festival and the film screenplay was awarded the Jury Award at the American Black Film Festival in 2019. It was screened at the San Francisco Black Film Festival in June 2019, at the Black Harvest Film Festival in Chicago in August 2019, at the Greater Cleveland Urban Film Festival in Ohio as well as the opening film for The Valley Film Festival in Los Angeles in September.
