= Dorry Segev =

American surgeon

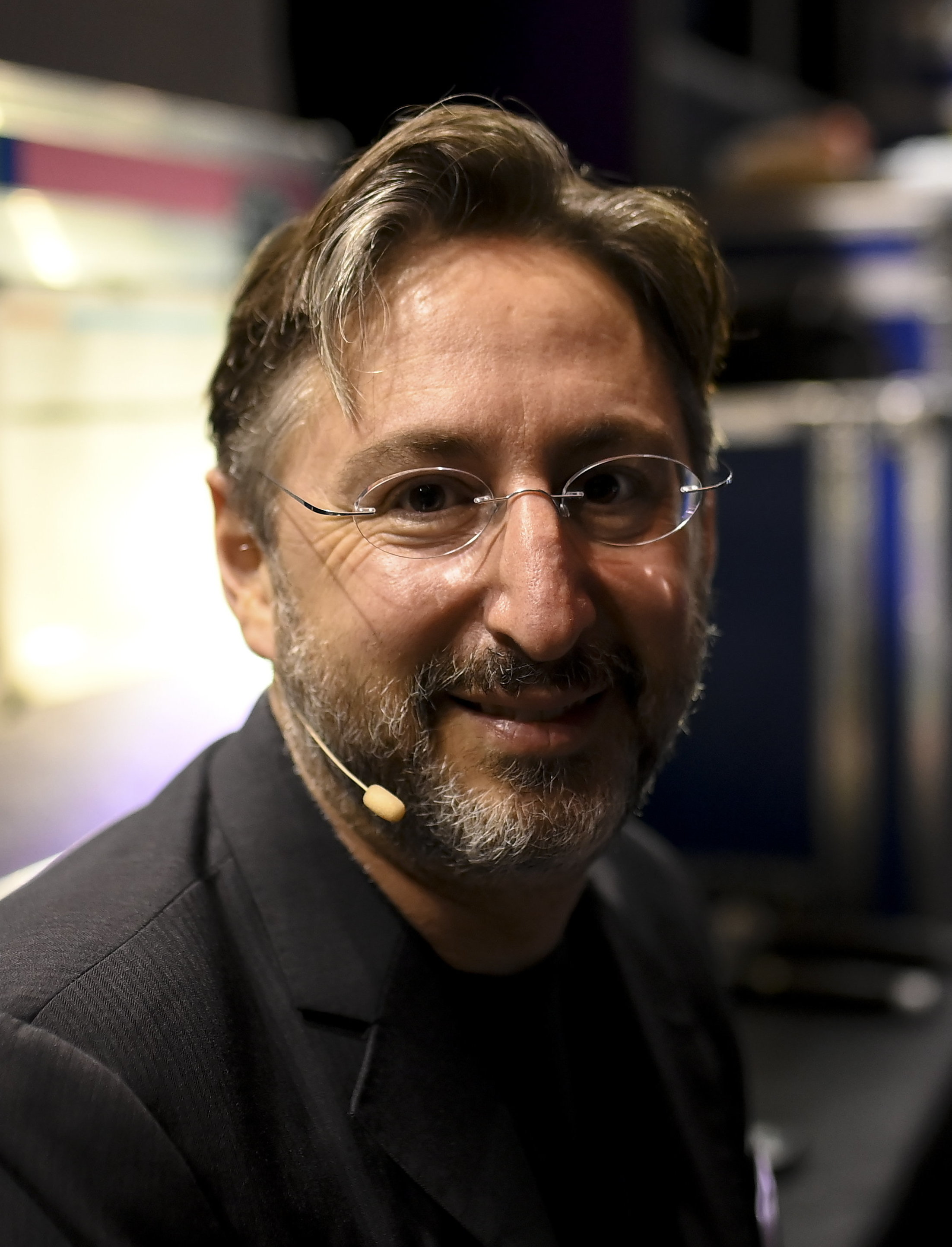
- Segev at the Web Summit in 2021
- Education: Rice University; Johns Hopkins University
- Known for: Kidney transplantation Nephrology; Transplantation HIV-to-HIV Transplantation
- Spouse: Sommer Gentry
- Scientific career
- Fields: Transplant surgery
- Workplaces: Johns Hopkins University

Dorry L. Segev is the head of the Center for Surgical and Transplant Applied Research at NYU Langone Health. Previously he served as the Marjory K. and Thomas Pozefsky Professor of Surgery at Johns Hopkins School of Medicine, professor of epidemiology at Johns Hopkins Bloomberg School of Public Health, and associate vice chair of the Department of Surgery at Johns Hopkins Hospital. He has made significant contributions to the field of transplantation, including developing a mathematical model to facilitate a nationwide kidney paired donation program, both in the US and Canada. He is also known for his role in getting the HIV Organ Policy Equity Act (or HOPE Act) signed into law.

== Education and career ==
Segev earned his B.S. in electrical engineering and B.A. in computer science at Rice University in 1992. He obtained his M.D. at Johns Hopkins University in 1996, as well as his M.H.S. in biostatistics and Ph.D. in clinical investigation at Johns Hopkins Bloomberg School of Public Health in 2009.

Both Segev and his wife, Sommer Gentry, have been featured in The Baltimore Sun, Science, Time, and The New York Times.

Segev is the director of the Epidemiology Research Group in Organ Transplantation at Johns Hopkins University.

=== Incompatible kidney transplant ===
There are over 20,000 patients on the kidney transplant waitlist who have become highly sensitized, making finding a compatible donor extremely difficult. These patients often spend years on the kidney transplant waitlist looking for a compatible donor. In a 2016 study published in The New England Journal of Medicine, Segev and his team found that patients who received a kidney transplant from an incompatible live donor had a much higher survival benefit compared to patients who stayed on dialysis or waited for a deceased donor transplant. There are over 20,000 patients on the waitlist who have become highly sensitized, meaning that they have developed antibodies human leukocyte antigens—HLAs—key components of the immune system. These findings show that moving forward with a live donor kidney transplant could be the best option for highly sensitized patients who have a healthy and willing donor.

=== Kidney paired donation ===
Kidney paired donation is a form of live donation where patients with incompatible donors swap kidneys to receive a compatible kidney.

The first kidney-paired donation was performed in South Korea in 1991, followed by one in Europe in 1999. Sommer Gentry and Dorry Segev found that the existing matching programs were not sufficient to accommodate the scale of the transplant waitlist in the United States. Previous matching programs limited kidney-transplant patients and their families to connect with other incompatible pairs on their own. Together, Segev and Gentry devised a nationwide system to match donor-patient pairs. Based on an algorithm created by the Canadian mathematician Jack Edmonds in 1965, the system improves paired donation by ensuring the maximum number of matches while still factoring in age, location and willingness to travel.

Under the direction of Segev and Robert Montgomery, Johns Hopkins completed the first five-way donor kidney swap among 10 individuals.

The longest kidney-pair chain to date included 70 participants and was completed in 2014.

=== HOPE Act and HIV positive transplantation in the U.S. ===
Before 2013, it was illegal to use organs from HIV+ donors for transplantation. Any organ whose donor was diagnosed with HIV would be immediately thrown out, despite them being otherwise healthy organs.

In May 2010, Brian Boyarsky sought out Segev's advice after doing previous research comparing transplant programs in different countries. During his research, Boyarsky met Elmi Muller, who had been successfully transplanting organs between HIV+ donors and recipients in South Africa. With that in mind, Segev and Boyarsky looked at both the Nationwide Inpatient Sample to study in-hospital deaths of HIV+ patients and the HIV Research Network, which provided granular disease-specific data, to calculate the impact of using organs from HIV+ donors on the organ transplant waitlist. Both data sources allowed Segev and Boyarsky to estimate a possible 500 to 600 HIV+ donors in the United States, whose organs were currently being discarded.

After appearing on the front page of The New York Times and Boyarsky's article appearing in the American Journal of Transplantation, Segev and his mentee visited every major national transplant and AIDS advocacy group in the US. Within weeks, they had every group officially supporting their campaign to legalize using organs from HIV+ donors for HIV+ recipients. In August 2011, Segev and Boyarsky sought out bipartisan support to change the existing law. California Senator Barbara Boxer (D) and Oklahoma Senator Tom Coburn (R) became the main sponsors of the bill first drafted by Segev and Boyarsky. They were later joined by congressional representatives Lois Capps (D) and Andy Harris (R) to support the bill in the House of Representatives.

The HIV Organ Policy Equity Act (or HOPE Act) was introduced in the Senate on February 14, 2013.

President Barack Obama signed the HOPE Act into law on November 21, 2013.

With the HOPE Act, HIV positive patients on the current kidney and liver waiting lists can elect to also be open to any organs whose donors were diagnosed with HIV. This would not remove the patients from accepting non-HIV positive organs. However, it does have the potential to significantly shorten a patient's wait time on the kidney and liver deceased donor wait list.

The first HIV-to-HIV transplants in the United States were performed on March 30, 2016, at Johns Hopkins University.

== Personal life ==
Segev married Sommer Gentry on October 18, 2003, in Ventura, California. They now both reside in New York City. Gentry is a full professor at the US Naval Academy and contributes to multiple research projects in Segev's lab.

Segev is an international teacher in swing dance and Lindy Hop with Gentry. In 2005, Segev and Gentry started Charm City Swing, a non-profit organization in Baltimore, Maryland, that is dedicated to introducing the art of swing dance to non-dancers. Charm City Swing found a permanent home at the Mobtown Ballroom in 2012.

== Honors and awards ==
- 2006 - Vanguard Prize, American Society of Transplant Surgeons
- 2007 - Dennis W Jahnigen Scholars Award, American Geriatrics Society
- 2008 - Clinical Scientist Development Award, Doris Duke Charitable Foundation
- 2009 - Julius Jacobson Promising Investigator Award, American College of Surgeons
- 2009 - John Merrill Award in Transplantation, American Society of Nephrology
- 2009 - Jocabson Promising Investigator Award, American College of Surgeons
- 2012 - ASTS Mid-Level Faculty Grant
- 2012 - Inducted, American Society for Clinical Investigation
- 2016 - Global Thinker Award, Foreign Policy magazine
- 2017 - Distinguished Alumnus Award, Johns Hopkins University
- 2022 - Kidney exchange beyond incompatibilities by Dr. Dorry Segev – Paradigm 5

== Most-cited publications ==
- Makary, Martin A., Dorry L. Segev, Peter J. Pronovost, Dora Syin, Karen Bandeen-Roche, Purvi Patel, a, Ryan Takenaga, Lara Devgan, Christine G. Holzmueller, Jing Tian, Linda P. Fried,. "Frailty as a predictor of surgical outcomes in older patients". Journal of the American College of Surgeons 210.6 (2010): 901-908. Cited by 568 articles, according to Google Scholar
- Segev, DL, Gentry SE, Warren DS, Reeb B, Montgomery RA. Kidney Paired Donation and optimizing the use of live donor organs. JAMA. 2005 Apr 20; 293 (15) 1883-90. Cited by 295 articles,
- Dorry L. Segev, MD, PhD; Abimereki D. Muzaale; Brian S. Caffo; Shruti H. Mehta, Andrew L. Singer, Sarah E. Taranto; Maureen A. McBride, Robert A. Montgomery. "Perioperative Mortality and Long-term Survival Following Live Kidney Donation" JAMA 2101 March 10; 303 (10) 959-966 Cited by 365 articles, r
- Robert A. Montgomery, Bonnie E. Lonze, Karen E. King, Edward S. Kraus, D., Lauren M. Kucirka, Jayme E. Locke, Daniel S. Warren, Christopher E. Simpkins, Nabil N. Dagher, Andrew L. Singer, Andrea A. Zachary, and Dorry L. Segev, "Desensitization in HLA-incompatible kidney recipients and survival". New England Journal of Medicine 365.4 (2011): 318-326. Cited by 309 articles,
