= Rusty Frank =

American dancer

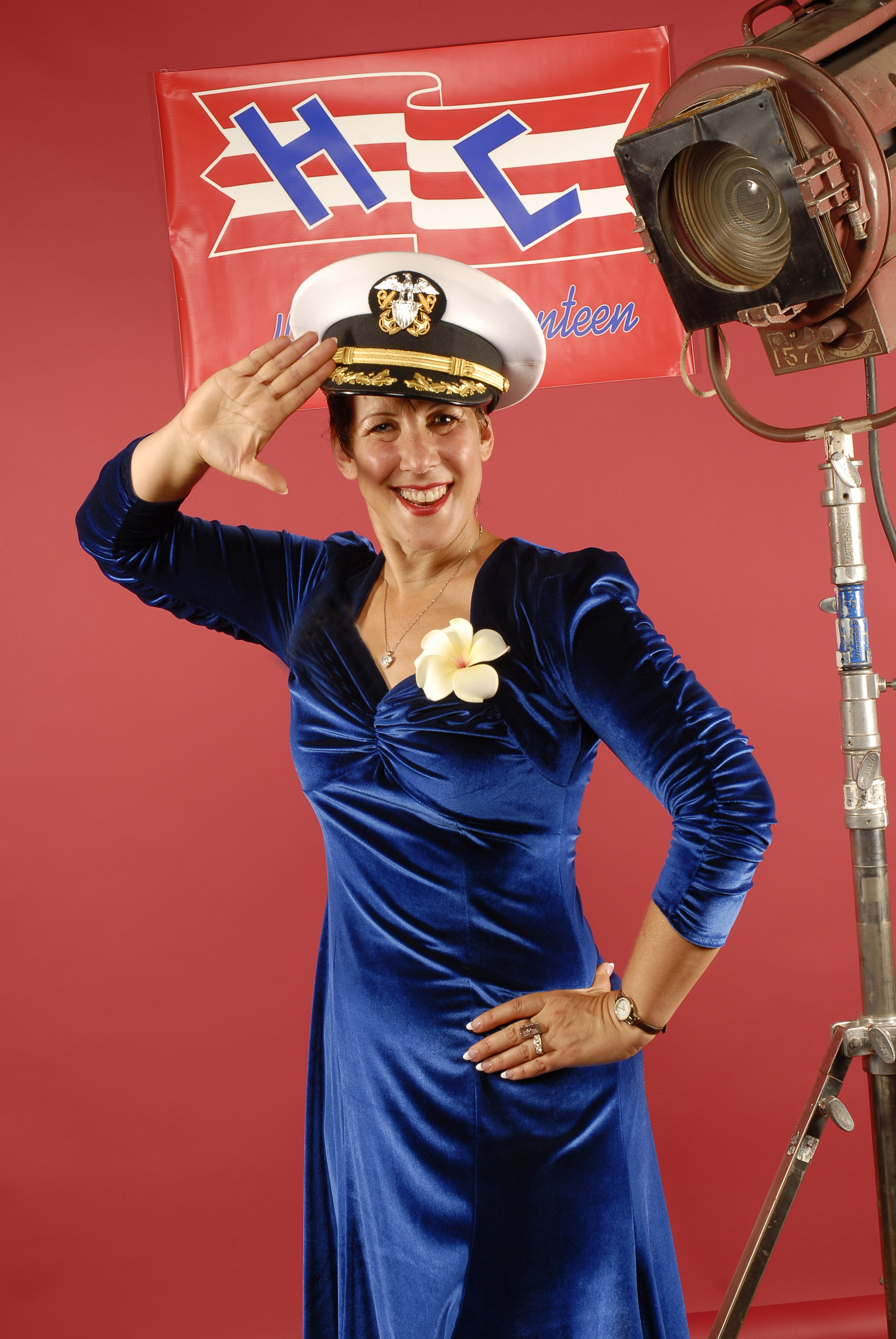
- Rusty Frank
- Born: February 25; Hollywood
- Occupation(s): Lindy Hopper, Tap Dancer, choreographer, producer, teacher, author, and dance preservationist

Rusty Frank is an American tap dancer, producer, writer, choreographer, lindy hopper, and dance preservationist.

== Early life ==
Rusty Frank was born in Hollywood, California, and raised in Los Angeles. She began dancing at age six, inspired as a child by watching classic American films of the 1930s and '40s, especially those of Shirley Temple. Frank attended the University of California, Santa Cruz, where she majored in Environmental Planning and Public Policy and graduated with double honors. She then attended the University of San Francisco, where she received her master's degree in Non-Profit Administration.

== Career ==
In 1998, Rusty Frank founded the largest swing dance program in Los Angeles consisting of Lindy by the Sea school and Rusty's Rhythm Club.

In 1989, Frank founded On Tap Dance Shop, through which she produces instructional-historical tap and swing dance videos.

== Shows ==
While attending college, Frank began dancing in stage productions, and her first show was "Minnie's Boys," followed by "Stan Freberg Presents The United States of America." In 1978, she moved to San Francisco, California and by the early 1980s was appearing regularly in musical shows, including: "Dames At Sea," "Babes In Arms," "42nd Street" with Diablo Civic Light Opera (DLOC), "5,6,7,8," and "Mack And Mabel."

She has tap danced professionally over the years with The San Francisco Tap Troupe, Six Feet a Tap Trio (Wayne Doba, Rodney Price), Pedal Extremities (Walter Freeman, Mark Mendonca, Michael Rainey), Tapology (Patti Meagher), The Rhythm Rascals (Walter Freeman), Mulligan and Whitmore "Tops in Taps" (Chester Whitmore), The Rhythm Pals (Alfred Desio), and with Greg Gast.

In 1989, 1990 and 1991, Frank produced, directed, and danced in an all-star tap revue Jazz Tap! featuring the Nicholas Brothers, Savion Glover, Arthur Duncan, Jeni LeGon and Brenda Bufalino. The show was performed at Kimball's East and the Sun Valley Lodge (where the movie Sun Valley Serenade took place).

In 1996, she began learning the Lindy Hop after she saw the English dance group The Jiving Lindy Hoppers perform. She partnered with Simon Selmon and moved to the United Kingdom for two years. She and Selmon made many appearances on television, in movies, on the radio, at festivals and special events. The team's high point came when they toured fifty-one European cities as the dance act for the big band stage show In The Mood – A Tribute to Glenn Miller.

In the US, Frank has performed at such prestigious venues as Broadway's 42nd Street, at the Hollywood Bowl, at Disneyland and at the world-famous Derby in Hollywood.

Currently, she regularly performs her tap dance routines at downtown Los Angeles's 1920s-themed nightclub Maxwell DeMille's Cicada Club, housed inside the historic 1928 art deco James Oviatt Building. She teaches private and group dance lessons in Los Angeles and at international dance camps, works on her tap documentary and produces instructional dance DVDs.

=== Historian ===
In 1990, Rusty's book TAP! The Greatest Tap Dance Stars and Their Stories, 1900–1955, was published in hardcover by William Morrow Press and in In March 1995, was reissued in soft cover by Da Capo Press. Actor and tap dancer Gregory Hines wrote the foreword to the book, for which she interviewed 30 tap-dance artists, including Ann Miller, Shirley Temple and Donald O'Connor. She has contributed to the Smithsonian Institution's Jazz Oral History project, along with the Encyclopædia Britannica, the Oxford Encyclopedia of Dance, The American National Biography, the Great Danish Encyclopedia, the jazz history Jazz: The First Century, published by William Morrow and Company, and Discover Jazz, published by Pearson.

Along with award-winning filmmaker Arthur Dong, Rusty is co-producing the documentary, TAP! Tempo of America. They were the recipients of a National Endowment for the Arts grant to aid in making this dance documentary.

She has also appeared in numerous dance documentaries, including the Fred Astaire and Ginger Rogers box set documentary for Warner Home Video, the BBC's Fascinating Rhythms – The Story of Tap, and This Joint is Jumpin' for Bravo. Rusty Frank is featured in Alive and Kicking, a feature-length documentary that takes an inside look into the people and culture of the Lindy Hop resurgence.

=== Awards and honors ===
- National Endowment for the Arts grant (for her in-progress documentary TAP! Tempo of America)
- California Institute of Contemporary Arts grant (for her in-progress documentary TAP! Tempo of America)
- 2015 – Inducted into the Camp Hollywood Swing Dance Hall of Fame
- 2008 – Inducted into the California Swing Dance Hall of Fame
- 2007 – "Tradition in Tap Award" for Outstanding Achievements and Significant Contribution to the Art and Tradition of Tap Dance
- 2006 – "The Tap Preservation Award" from New York's American Tap Dance Foundation
- 2002 – "The Historic Preservation Award" from The Art Deco Society of California
- 1992 – "Soul of Shipley" award from National Association of Dance & Affiliated Artists (NAADA)
- 1991 – "Dance in Action" award for Contribution in Dance
