= Countdown (American TV series) =

American television series

- Genre: Crime drama
- Created by: Derek Haas
- Showrunner: Derek Haas
- Written by: Derek Haas
- Starring: Jensen Ackles; Jessica Camacho; Violett Beane; Elliot Knight; Uli Latukefu; Eric Dane
- Country of origin: United States
- Original language: English
- No. of seasons: 1
- No. of episodes: 13

Production
- Executive producer: Derek Haas
- Running time: 45–54 minutes
- Production companies: Derek Haas Productions; Jax Media; Amazon MGM Studios

Original release
- Network: Amazon Prime Video
- Release: June 25 – September 3, 2025

Countdown is an American crime drama television series created and written by Derek Haas. It stars Jensen Ackles, Jessica Camacho, Violett Beane, Elliot Knight, Uli Latukefu and Eric Dane. It was released on Amazon Prime Video on June 25, 2025. In October 2025, the series was canceled after one season.

== Premise ==
After a Department of Homeland Security officer is killed in plain sight, LAPD detective Mark Meachum is brought onto a covert task force with undercover agents from various law enforcement agencies to track down the murderer. However, the search reveals a much darker conspiracy than anyone expected, sparking a frantic race to protect a city of millions.

== Cast and characters ==
=== Main ===
- Jensen Ackles as Detective Mark Meachum, from LAPD Robbery/Homicide Division. Meachum is known both for his skills as an undercover agent and also his reckless cowboy behavior. Meachum is a former US Army Ranger with multiple deployments to combat zones.
- Jessica Camacho as Special Agent Amber Oliveras, a DEA agent with undercover experience
- Violett Beane as Special Agent Evan Shepherd, an agent with the FBI who specializes in cyber crimes
- Elliot Knight as FBI Special Agent Keyonte Bell, who specializes in terrorist threats, homegrown and otherwise
- Uli Latukefu as LAPD Detective Luke Finau, an 18-year veteran in LAPD's Gang and Narcotics division
- Eric Dane as FBI Special Agent Nathan Blythe, Special Agent in Charge of the task force

=== Recurring ===
- Merrick McCartha as Los Angeles District Attorney Grayson Valwell
- Jonathan Togo as Senior Special Agent Damon Drew, assigned to the DHS Office of Intelligence and Analysis, Los Angeles Field Office. SSA Drew is a former DHS Homeland Security Investigations (HSI) field agent and a military intelligence veteran.
- Bogdan Yasinski as Borys "Volchek" , a former Belarusian Defense Ministry official turned extremist
- Joe Dinicol as United States Secret Service Special Agent Ryan "Fitz" Fitzgerald
- Matt Kaminsky as Jerry, a bomb squad member

== Episodes ==
No.	Title	Directed by	Written by	Original release date
1	"Teeth in the Bone"	Jonathan Brown	Derek Haas	June 25, 2025
A Department of Homeland Security agent is assassinated, prompting FBI Special Agent Nathan Blythe (Dane) to form a special task force consisting of LAPD detective Mark Meachum (Ackles), DEA agent Amber Oliveras (Camacho), DHS intelligence and analysis officer Damon Drew (Togo), FBI cyber crime specialist Evan Shepherd (Beane), FBI terrorism specialist Keyonte Bell (Knight), and LAPD gangs and narcotics specialist Luke Finau (Latukefu). Meachum is fresh out of a long undercover assignment with the Aryan Brotherhood struggles with anger issues, while Oliveras has a documented history of drug abuse. The task force finds a suspicious deposit in the dead DHS agent's bank account, which leads them to the Los Reyes Nuevos cartel in Tijuana, and discovers a large deposit of fissile material left at the Port of Los Angeles.
2	"Dead Lots of Times"	Avi Youabian	Derek Haas	June 25, 2025
In Minsk, Belarus, in 2008, Borys Volcheck (Yasinski) finds his brother Anton beat up by an American, who ends up blackmailing Borys to commit espionage on the Kremlin. When Anton commits suicide, Borys kills the American in revenge. Back in Los Angeles, Oliveras reassumes her cover as a cartel drug runner working with the Los Reyes Nuevos cartel. She talks her way into a task to smuggle a container truck from Tijuana back to Los Angeles to regain cartel lieutenant Javi Lopez's trust. After being stopped at the border, the task force causes a scene which led to Meachum getting temporarily arrested by Mexican police. They return the truck full of heroin to Lopez, but he and his bodyguard are killed shortly after, leaving the team with only a name of the suspect. Meanwhile, LA District Attorney Grayson Valwell (McCartha) wants to join the task force.
3	"Happy Birthday Final"	Tess Malone	Derek Haas	June 25, 2025
The task force uses Meachum's former alias to befriend Belarusian inmate Timur Novikov, who owes Meachum a favor, attempting to use him to get information about the Belarusian underground in Los Angeles and identify Volchek, who killed Javi Lopez. The warden of Palmdale Prison will not allow Meachum to get back in his prison, so the task force stages a fake jailbreak in order to gain Novikov's trust. Novikov brings Meachum to his uncle Mikhail's dance hall in Burbank, where Meachum discovers plans of an attack on the city of Los Angeles. To preserve the plans, Volchek, posing as Mikhail's guard, burns down the dance hall. In the resulting shootout between the task force and Mikhail, Noikov is shot dead, while a shot that missed Finau hits Drew in the chest. In the background, district attorney Valwell continues to intrude on the task force's operations.
4	"Bite 'Em Down"	Chris Grismer	Derek Haas	July 2, 2025
After an injured Drew dies from his wounds at the hospital, the task force is more determined than ever to catch Volchek. They discover a lead when Meachum remembers a name from the dance hall. While they investigate, Blythe deals with an underlying threat from the LAPD, who wants to reassign their detectives from the task force. The team tracks down Volchek's associate Mikhail and interrogates his wife, who eventually gives up a way to contact him. They arrange a meeting, but Mikhail spots the team and runs. After learning he has a daughter, they used Shepherd's likeness to get him to reveal information about how to contact Volchek. However, they are outsmarted again when Volchek sends a decoy to Van Nuys Airport while he escapes.
5	"Blurred Edges"	Avi Youabian	Derek Haas	July 9, 2025
Meeting in offices of Blue Lion foods discussing Belarus trade. Turns out the burned down dance hall has off-site surveillance video storage. The team probes the Belarus consulate for intel.
6	"A Needle or a Bullet"	Jonathan Brown	Derek Haas	July 16, 2025
7	"Nothing Else Helps"	Eric Stoltz	Derek Haas	July 23, 2025
8	"The Nail in the Chair"	Nina Lopez-Corrado	Derek Haas	July 30, 2025
9	"10–33"	Jonathan Brown	Derek Haas	August 6, 2025
10	"The Muzzle Pile"	Lisa Robinson	Derek Haas	August 13, 2025
11	"Run"	Rashidi Natara Harper	Derek Haas	August 20, 2025
New storytelling starts, Secret Service tip. Task force reassembly, codename "Todd" for criminal. December 2023 flashback: stakeout at residence, man arrives, killer enters house to find man with lover, opts to not kill, steals the family dog.
12	"This Is His Signature"	Lisa Robinson	Derek Haas	August 27, 2025
13	"Your People Are in Danger"	Jonathan Brown	Derek Haas	September 3, 2025
Ends on a cliffhanger, Oliveras running across a field as the rifle trigger is readied.

== Production ==
The 13-part series from Amazon MGM Studios was created by Derek Haas, who is also an executive producer and the series showrunner. Jensen Ackles was confirmed as part of the cast in June 2024. That month, Eric Dane and Jessica Camacho joined the cast. Violett Beane, Uli Latukefu and Elliot Knight joined the cast in July 2024.

Filming was set to start in Los Angeles in September 2024 and in December 2024, photos from the set appeared in the media. In March 2025, members of the cast announced on social media that production had wrapped. On October 10, 2025, Amazon Prime Video canceled the series after one season.

== Release ==
Countdown premiered on June 25, 2025, with the first three episodes available immediately and the rest debuting on a weekly basis until September 3, 2025.

Countdown is expected to air on syndication in 2026, 18 months after its original streaming run.

== Reception ==
The review aggregator website Rotten Tomatoes reported a 38% approval rating based on 16 critic reviews. Metacritic, which uses a weighted average, assigned a score of 43 out of 100 based on 8 critics, indicating "mixed or average".

Reviewing the series' first 3 episodes for Screen Rant, Felipe Rangel gave a rating of 7/10 for the first 3 episodes and said, "It does great work in that regard, starting with a thrilling chase sequence and featuring quite a few creative set pieces." Joshua M. Patton of Comic Book Resources gave the series a 9/10 rating and described it "a setup audiences know very well, but how Countdown unfolds over its first season expertly balances viewer expectations and fresh, surprising storytelling". Jeff Ewing of Collider gave the series a rating of 8/10 and commented, "Countdown isn't quite original enough in its premise to completely feel like a breath of fresh air. Still, it capably makes use of compelling characters, strong performers, and an evolving situation with dangerous implications".

Aramide Tinubu of Variety gave a critical review, writing "Unfortunately, though the show has all of the fundamentals needed for an engaging action series, Countdown grows duller by the episode." Dave Nemetz of TVLine gave the series a C+ and noted, "It doesn't always hit on all cylinders, but it delivers the fireworks we're looking for from a show like this. It's like a battering ram slamming through a screen door: not very subtle, but undeniably effective. Teo Kai Xiang of The Straits Times cited viewers' criticism of the 11th episode's inaccurate depiction of Singaporeans, particularly the portrayal of a Singaporean businessman who spoke only Malay and needing an interpreter when speaking with investigators despite the fact that English is the main working language of the country.
