= Any Day Now (2024 film) =

2024 crime film

- Release date: 2024
- Country: United States

Any Day Now is a 2024 American crime comedy film directed by Eric Aronson. It is based on the 1990 Isabella Stewart Gardner Museum theft in Boston, offering a semi-fictionalized portrayal of the event.

== Plot ==
On March 13, 1990, a group of thieves stole 13 paintings worth hundreds of millions of dollars from Boston's Isabella Stewart Gardner Museum in what remains one of the greatest unsolved art heists in history. The film is a fictionalized account of the events leading up to the robbery, centering on Steve (Taylor Gray), an unassuming security guard who assists criminal Marty Lyons (Paul Guilfoyle) in carrying out the heist.

== Cast ==
- Paul Guilfoyle as Marty Lyons
- Taylor Gray as Steve Baker
- Alexandra Templer as Sara
- Armando Rivera as Danny
- Shawn Fitzgibbon as Bob Ra
- David Pridemore as Beak
- Mike Bash as Mooch
- Shaun Bedgood as Traft
- Georgia Lyman as Delong
- Thomas Kee as Kevin McDonald
- Thomas Philip O'Neill as Albert
- Ting as Ian Davis
- Sheriden Thomas as Aunt Celia Marshall
- Jose Guns Alves as Jack Wiggins

== Release ==
The film premiered at the Boston Film Festival in 2024. It was released theatrically on March 18, 2025. It received positive reviews from critics.
