= Taylor Gray (actor) =

American actor (born 1993)

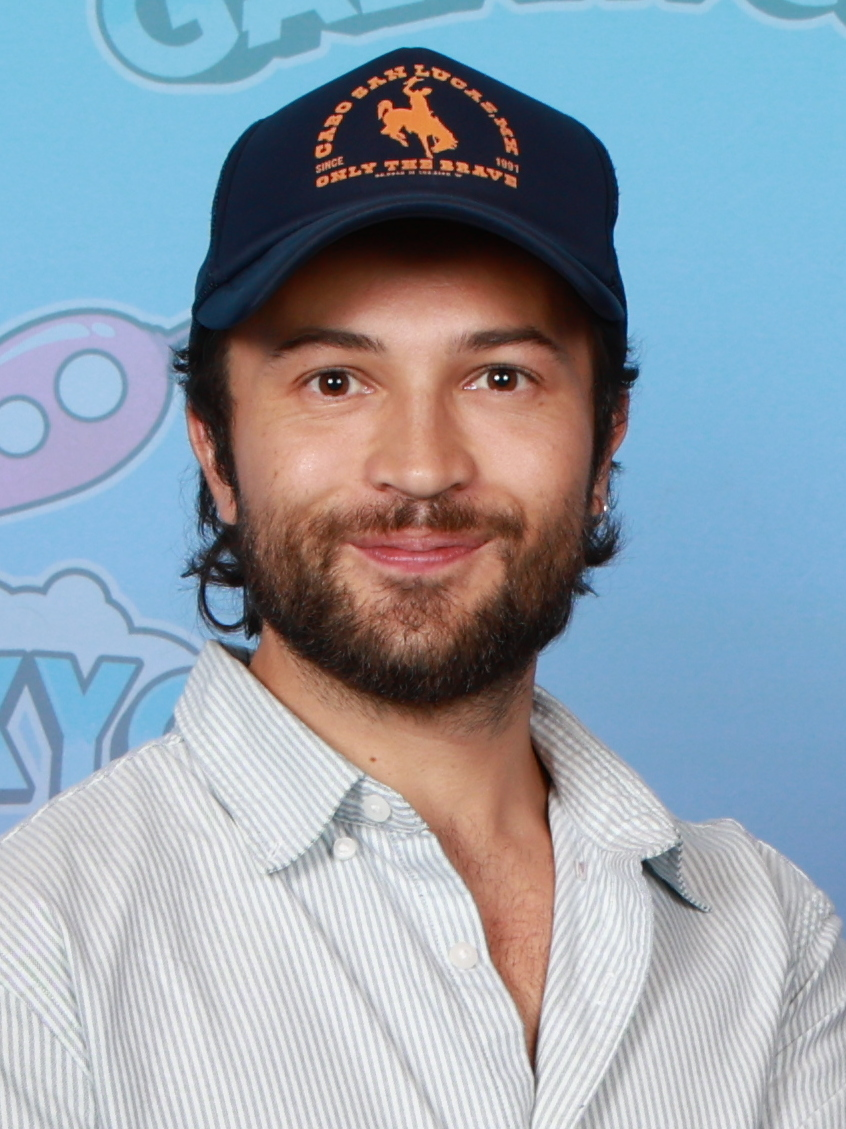
- Gray at GalaxyCon Raleigh in 2024
- Born: Taylor Arthur Gray; September 7, 1993 (age 33); Whittier, California, U.S.
- Occupation: Actor
- Years active: 2007–present
- Television: Star Wars Rebels; Bucket & Skinner's Epic Adventures

Taylor Arthur Gray (born September 7, 1993) is an American actor, best known for playing Ezra Bridger on the animated television series Star Wars Rebels, and Bucket in the Nickelodeon series Bucket & Skinner's Epic Adventures.

He also played animator Friz Freleng in the 2015 film Walt Before Mickey, and the lead role of Brian in the 2012 film Thunderstruck with professional basketball player Kevin Durant.

== Filmography ==
=== Film ===
Year	Title	Role	Notes
2007	The Tenth Day	Danny	Short
2007	A Starchy World	Classroom Kid 4	Short
2007	The Take	Javy De La Pena	
2012	Chelsea's Channel	Himself	Video Short
2012	Thunderstruck	Brian Newall	
2014	Audience of Ours	Scotty Falls	Short Also Producer and Writer
2015	Walt Before Mickey	Friz Freleng	
2021	The Wheel	Walker	
2024	Saturday Night	Al Franken	
2025	Any Day Now	Steve Baker	
2025	Terrestrial	Anton	
2025	Renner	Chad	Post-production
TBA	Lullaby	Logan	Short; Post-Production

=== Television ===
Year	Title	Role	Notes
2007	Numb3rs	Jo Santiago	Episode "One Hour"
2009	Hawthorne	Carlos Gonzalez	Episode "No Guts, No Glory"
2010	The Mentalist	Shorter Kid	Episode "Aingavite Baa (Red Water)"
2011–2013	Bucket & Skinner's Epic Adventures	Bucket	Main: 26 Episodes (Season 1)
2013	TinaQ's Celebrity Interviews	Himself	1 Episode: #4.8
2013	Elizabeth Stanton's Great Big World	Himself	Documentary 1 Episode: #3.7
2014	Radio Disney Music Awards	Himself	Television Movie
2014–2018	Star Wars Rebels	Ezra Bridger	Voice; Main: 75 Episodes
2016	Strange Ones	Rich	1 Episode: #1.1
2016–2017	The Star Wars Show	Himself-Voice of 'Ezra Bridger'	Shorts Guest: 2 Episodes
2017	Star Wars Celebration 2017	Himself-Special Guest	1 Episode: #1.3
2017	In The Vault	Karlis Kanderovskis	Main: 4 Episodes (Season 1)
2018	Star Wars Forces of Destiny	Ezra Bridger	Voice; 1 Episode: #2.15
2019	She-Ra and the Princesses of Power	Young Micah	Voice

=== Television special ===
Year	Title
2011	Nickelodeon's Kids Choice Awards 2011
2011	Nickelodeon's Worldwide Day of Play: Get Your Game On
2011	TeenNick Halo Awards
2012	Nickelodeon's Kids' Choice Awards 2012
2013	82nd Annual Hollywood Christmas Parade

=== Video games ===
Year	Title	Role	Notes
2015	Star Wars: Rebels – Recon Missions	Ezra Bridger	Voice
2015	Disney Infinity 3.0	Ezra Bridger	Voice
