= Renner (film) =

2025 film by Robert Rippberger

- Release poster
- Directed by: Robert Rippberger
- Written by: Luke Medina; Martin Medina; Robert Rippberger; David Largman Murray
- Story by: Luke Medina
- Produced by: Devin Keaton; Robert Rippberger; Martin Medina; Jay Burnley; KT Kent
- Starring: Frankie Muniz; Violett Beane; Taylor Gray; Marcia Gay Harden
- Cinematography: Sean Emer
- Edited by: Gabriel Cullen
- Music by: Rony Barrak
- Production companies: Renner Film, LLC
- Distributed by: Seismic Releasing
- Release date: February 7, 2025
- Country: United States
- Language: English

Renner is a 2025 American science fiction thriller film starring Frankie Muniz, Violett Beane, Taylor Gray, and Marcia Gay Harden. Directed by Robert Rippberger and written by Luke Medina and Martin Medina, it was released in limited theaters on February 7, 2025.

== Premise ==
Computer whiz Renner attempts to win over his neighbor Jamie with the help of an AI life coach he created named Salenus. However, he soon discovers that he inadvertently programmed his manipulative mother's personality into the AI.

== Cast ==
- Frankie Muniz as Renner, a computer genius
- Violett Beane as Jamie, Renner's love interest
- Taylor Gray as Chad
- Craig Lamar Traylor as James
- Estes Tarver as a henchman
- Marcia Gay Harden as Salenus (voice), an AI life coach designed by Renner

== Production ==
In May 2023, it was reported that Robert Rippberger would direct and produce the film. That same month Frankie Muniz, Violett Beane and Taylor Gray signed on to star. Marcia Gay Harden voices the AI named Salenus.

Principal photography began in Spring Hope, North Carolina at Ascent Studios in early June 2023.

== Release ==
Renner was released in limited theaters in the United States on February 7, 2025 and was later released through VOD on March 28, 2025.

On the review aggregator website Rotten Tomatoes, 41% of 22 critics' reviews are positive, with an average rating of 4.8/10.
