= The Wheel (2021 film) =

- Directed by: Steve Pink
- Written by: Trent Atkinson
- Produced by: Trent Atkinson; Taylor Gray; Sean Crampton; Amber Midthunder; Steve Pink; Josh Jason; Molly Gilula
- Starring: Amber Midthunder; Taylor Gray; Bethany Anne Lind; Nelson Lee
- Cinematography: Bella Gonzales
- Edited by: Neal Wynne
- Music by: Matt Beckley
- Production companies: Hurley/Pickle Productions; Eastern Blocc
- Distributed by: Quiver Distribution
- Release dates: September 13, 2021 (TIFF); July 22, 2022 (United States)
- Running time: 83 minutes
- Country: United States
- Language: English

The Wheel is a 2021 American romantic drama film directed by Steve Pink, starring Amber Midthunder, Taylor Gray, Bethany Anne Lind, and Nelson Lee.

== Cast ==
- Amber Midthunder as Albee
- Taylor Gray as Walker
- Bethany Anne Lind as Carly
- Nelson Lee as Ben
- Carly Nykanen as Joan
- Kevin Pasdon as Aaron

== Plot ==
The film starts with wife Albee and husband Walker headed to an Air BnB for a weekend to see if they can fix their relationship using a book called, "Seven Questions to Save Your Marriage". Their relationship is strained, with Walker making repeated attempts at communication and connection, which keep being rebuffed by Albee, who is clearly agitated but not willing to address their root problems.

They make it to the Air BnB, which is by a lake in a wooded area, and as the host, Carly, gets them settled, Albee is uncomfortably honest about why they are there. After she leaves, we see a sweet interaction between Carly and her fiancée, Ben, who are getting ready for their own upcoming marriage.

There's a brief scene where Albee goes to take a bath (and be alone after yet another spat), and Walker stops by to offer her a glass of champagne. He brought two glasses, hoping to share and maybe talk. She turns him down, but asks what will happen if it doesn't work, as in the weekend and the book to save their marriage. When he says he guesses they'll break up, she asks if they'll be ok and specifically if he'll be ok. He doesn't answer but walks back to the room after a pause.

There's another scene with Carly and Ben where Carly says she'd like to invite their guests to have lunch with them since they are having relationship issues and she'd like to be nice to them, but Ben says he doesn't think it's a good idea--"Bad relationships are contagious".

Walker gets ready to sleep on the couch. He makes a gentle attempt to be romantic with Albee during a brief conversation of theirs where we see a glimpse of them actually enjoying one another's company, but she shakes her head and says, "I'm not there." He spends the night on the couch, waking to find Albee not in the bed. He walks outside to find her searching for a phone signal (something she searched for with little luck on the drive there, as well). She finally gets a signal and is absorbed in her phone. Walker leaves her alone.

Carly is taking a breakfast tray to the guests and stops by where Ben is—a spot in the woods with the start of a small wooden stage where the wedding will be. When she walks up, he's on his phone, and she asks how the altar is coming, whether it might be finished that week. He says maybe and then stops her—he'll take the tray to the guests because, as he jokes, he doesn't trust her (to not invite them over for a meal like she mentioned before). As Ben approaches the cabin where Albee and Walker are, he hears most of the fight that was sparked by the first question in the book--"What was the first thing that drew you to your partner?" Albee's answer is "that you liked me", which isn't satisfying to Walker, who insists there's something deeper to their initial attraction. He describes his memory of when they first met, how he thought she was interesting and pretty and special, which sets Albee off. She insists they were 12, only children, and that it had just been a crush, which for most people would have faded, but they got married at 16 instead of growing out of it. He insists she choose him for a reason, and she says, stingingly, "Or you were just the first one that asked." Walker tries to continue the conversation, but Albee goes inside, saying, "I answered your question. This is done." Ben turns and leaves, unnoticed, drinking one of the 2 coffees on the tray as he goes. When he gets back, Carly asks what happened, and he says they weren't home.

Later, Walker comes across Carly working on wedding preparations in the woods and offers professional pointers on the construction of the flower beds. He and Carly get to talking about how he met Albee in foster care, how she got adopted by a bad man, and that Walker promised Albee he'd look after her, so he will.

At a bar, Ben is getting a Saturday morning beer after picking up some lumber, and Albee is having a beer with some food. Ben sees her and walks over, knowing that she doesn't know who he is yet. He strikes up a conversation, which Albee naturally assumes is a come-on, and she answers him testily, as the awkward conversation continues. The bartender mentions Ben's fiancée, and Albee thinks he's been caught, so tells the bartender to put her meal on his tab and jets.

Back at the cabin, Walker has made a picnic and has a canoe ready to go (with the book, for the next question—on the water where she can't run away/slam a door again). Albee catches on to his plan and playfully pushes the canoe out on the water with only Walker in it. He starts to read the next question from the boat, but they devolve into easy teasing, banter, and Walker throwing picnic food at her from the boat as she taunts his missed throws. We see the fun and joy that must have made up most of their early romance. He asks if she's sure she doesn't want to go out on the water, and she says he's on his own, so he starts to row away (to her protests) and spends some time relaxing in the canoe on the lake alone. When he gets back, he's agitated from seeing texts on Albee's phone (which was left on the canoe) from a friend of hers asking if she had dumped him yet. Albee tells him Carly stopped by while he was gone invited them for lunch, and she said yes because she didn't know what else to say, and to make up to Walker for being a "b*tch" the day before.

Carly is preparing food when Ben gets back and lets him know she invited the guests over, to his chagrin. Ben tells her about his run-in with Albee—not mentioning that she thought he was hitting on her, only that he was "feeling her out" to "see how much of an a**hole she was".

Over lunch, and since he got off the canoe, Albee notices and is concerned by Walker's unusual behavior (tense, not talking much, drinking hard liquor). She tells Carly and Ben that she and Walker were supposed to be using the book instead of having lunch with them, but she changed the plan, so that's why he's upset. She tries to get him to leave and do the book with her, but he doesn't get up and instead says maybe she's right—maybe the book is "just 7 dumb questions." Carly jumps in to try to salvage the situation and get them talking again by offering to do a few questions all together—an idea Ben tries to quash to no avail.

Walker goes to get the book, after Albee follows trying to dissuade him. Putting the dishes away, Carly catches Ben up on Albee's past and expresses her concern. Ben is not concerned about Albee, but instead calls her a monster. Carly insists this is the right thing to do and asks for Ben to do this for her, to which he begrudgingly agrees.

Ben catches Albee on her way back and tells her what he thinks of her. They agree they both think each other is an "a**hole".

With everyone back together with the book, Walker starts reading the next question but keeps getting interrupted by the buzzing of Albee's phone. He asks if she's going to answer it, but she takes the book and reads the question instead--"Looking at your partner, tell them the first time you felt wounded by them." A reluctant Ben (the only one standing) goes first—Carly laughed at a woodworking piece he gave her around the beginning of their relationship. Albee criticizes it as a lame response, insisting that people who love each other hurt each other worse than that. She brings up that it seemed like Ben had been hitting on her at the bar and needles Carly, trying to test their relationship. Walker interjects and asks Albee, "Whats the worst thing I ever did to you?" She says it's that he's a liar, that he's lying right now, to which he responds with confusion and denial--"how could you say that?" She says she'll answer by telling his answer for him—the time she hurt him most was on their honeymoon. It was one of the only times she was vaguely interested in sex, and Walker was having trouble getting it up. Instead of comforting him or helping him, she made him cry. She knows she's cruel. So why is Walker sitting here, married to her, pretending that she's not? Albee says that's why he's a liar.

Having enough of Albee pushing his buttons, Walker asks if she ever loved him. Albee admits that she did not come to this trip expecting anything to get better. Walker takes her still buzzing phone, runs to the lake, and throws it in, with Albee following in a panic, trying to stop him. He calls her out for crying over the phone, which is more emotion than she's shown over him. He asks is she was ever going to try to fix their relationship, and she says no. Walker starts to ask more questions but takes them back and walks off.

Ben tells Carly I-told-you-so as she laments that's not how she wanted things to go. They end their own argument on a sour note due to Ben's callousness. Carly picks up the book left by the couple later that night and reads Walker's notes to himself that he used as a bookmark—reminders to be patient and kind, and of the positive things he wanted to convey to Albee.

The next day, Albee wakes up to Walker being gone—we cut to him making and finishing the altar Ben was supposed to make for Carly.

Carly has another breakfast tray for the guests as Ben comes in with apology croissants. When Carly drops off the tray, she learns from Albee that they broke up last night. She tries to talk to Albee, but Albee shuts the door.

Carly has a fitting for her wedding dress later and asks her friend what her honest opinion of Ben/them getting married is. The friend says the most important thing is does he make you happy? Carly says she thinks so, but ultimately isn't sure. She brings up the altar he's been supposed build for weeks and just won't finish. The friend says she thinks Ben is a f*ckboi—he's an ex musician from LA who ran away to the woods and isn't really grown up yet.

Albee picks up the book Carly had returned when dropping off breakfast and sees Walker's notes.

Ben comes across Walker finishing up the altar, compliments his work, and asks if Carly had seen it (she hadn't). Walker tells Ben that he and Albee broke up for good, and Ben tells him this is the best thing that could have happened. Walker asks if he can stay on and work/have a place to stay, and Ben says if Walker lets Ben take the credit for building the altar, that's fine.

Albee is packed and waiting for Walker to leave, still wondering where he is, when he returns and tells her to take their car, that he's staying. She is making some level of effort now, trying to reconcile, but Walker seems exhausted by everything that's happened and tells her he felt foolish for trying and that she should go. So she does.

She finds Walker's lactose pills in her bag and turns around to drop them off with Carly and Ben for Walker. During the conversation, Albee finds out Walker told them about her troubled childhood, has a bad reaction, and storms off. Carly immediately goes to tell Walker what just happened, out of concern for Albee, and she drives him to the bar, where she was tipped off that Albee is. At the bar, Walker keeps an eye on Albee as she flirts with a random guy over pool, but Walker eventually leaves.

At the altar, Ben finds Carly, where she asks him if he even wants to get married, and he says he doesn't know. She says she knows. And that it's a shame because Walker did such a wonderful job on the altar. She had figured it out on her own.

Albee takes the other guy into the bathroom and starts to hookup with him, but almost immediately has a triggered reaction and tells him to leave, which he does. She sobs on the floor.

Walker is at the ferris wheel that's been temporarily installed, drinking a beer and watching it.

Albee leaves the bar to find Carly waiting for her. She actually has a real conversation with her this time and accepts some comforting words and a hug. Albee reflects on her relationship with Walker and runs to the ferris wheel to talk with him. She says one ride, and if he wants to leave after that, he can, but she'll be staying.

On the wheel, they finally break down the barriers to their communication and instead of having a one-sided conversation or an argument, they are both genuinely trying—being vulnerable, being honest, not hiding behind jokes or insults. As has been alluded to, Albee is so afraid of confronting her trauma, of being a broken wreck, that she can't bring herself to do it, and that's been a major barrier to both of their happiness and has kept their relationship from working well. She also struggles to see Walker's love as authentic when she thinks of herself as so unlovable. She describes Walker the day they met—she did remember, and she did think he was special too. She says she needed him to see the ugly in her because what if she first let herself feel safe in his love, and then he saw her ugliness and rejected her? She tells him she loves him so much, even though she's bad at it, and they embrace through tears for a revolution before the ride stops. The attendant asks if they are staying or going, and Albee says she's staying. After an extremely long pause, Walker gets up, and Albee starts crying softly... Until Walker comes back with fries to share, and a super relieved Albee eventually cracks a smile, knowing she deserved that.

Roll credits.

== Release ==
The film premiered at the 2021 Toronto International Film Festival on September 13, 2021. The film was released in the United States on July 22, 2022.

== Reception ==
On review aggregation website Rotten Tomatoes, the film has an approval rating of 91% based on 32 reviews. The website's critical consensus reads, "Beautifully filmed and brought to life by a quartet of fine performances, The Wheel spins a quietly moving story about love and relationships." Richard Roeper of the Chicago Sun-Times rated the film 3 stars out of 4, writing that "The four main players are all excellent, with Amber Midthunder delivering particularly outstanding work that shows she is a young actor capable of great things." Nicolas Rapold of The New York Times wrote a positive review of the film, writing that "The story ends with an ambitiously staged sequence that reaches for another level of feeling, but it’s hard for anything to match the bruising depiction of Albee and Walker’s rough road to that point."

Angie Han of The Hollywood Reporter wrote that while the film may not "reinvent the wheel", it "delivers something that nevertheless feels new and surprising". Paul Risker of PopMatters gave the film a rating of 7 out of 10, writing that "Scars and wounds are scratched at in The Wheel. As uncomfortable as that is, the power of cinema is to tell a story that’s as much about the audience as it is about the characters." Matt Goldberg of Collider gave the film a rating of B, writing that it is "somber, melancholic, sad, sweet, and emotionally jagged in the best way possible." Mae Abdulbaki of Screen Rant rated the film 3 stars out of 5, writing that "in letting the main couple understand, acknowledge, and sit in their feelings — be they hurt, anger, frustration, or loneliness — is when the film is at its best."

Peter Debruge of Variety praised the performances while criticizing Pink's direction, writing that he "shows almost no intuition for how to block or shoot a scene". Noel Murray of the Los Angeles Times wrote a mixed review of the film, writing that "for all its formulaic faults, “The Wheel” is unusually astute about the ways some couples avoid the hard truths about each other because they are afraid of ripping their whole lives apart."
