= Those Who Walk Away (film) =

2022 American horror film

- Theatrical release poster
- Directed by: Robert Rippberger
- Written by: Robert Rippberger, Spencer Moleda
- Produced by: Robert Rippberger, KT Kent
- Starring: Booboo Stewart, Scarlett Sperduto, Grant Morningstar, Bryson JonSteele, Nils Stewart
- Cinematography: Diego Cordero
- Edited by: Gabriel Cullen
- Music by: Dmitrii Miachin
- Production companies: SIE Films, Argentic Productions
- Distributed by: VMI Releasing
- Release dates: February 11, 2022 (Theatrically & VOD)
- Running time: 93 minutes
- Country: United States
- Language: English

Those Who Walk Away is a 2022 American horror film directed and written by Robert Rippberger. The film stars Booboo Stewart, known for his role in the Descendants trilogy, the Twilight franchise, and X-Men. Co-stars include Scarlett Sperduto, Grant Morningstar, Bryson JonSteele, and Nils Allen Stewart, who plays the monster "Rotcreep."

The film is based on Ursula K. Le Guin's short story "The Ones Who Walk Away from Omelas". Like1917 (2019) and Rope (1948), it was shot in one continuous take.

The film was released theatrically in the U.S. and distributed internationally by VMI Releasing.

== Reception ==
The film received largely negative reviews and currently holds an approval rating of 33% on Rotten Tomatoes.

The film was a top pick by The New York Times in March 2022.

...The payoff is demented and worth the wait.

— Erik Piepenburg, The New York Times

A highly original and brilliant psychological thriller that is unique and thoughtful in its own highly original way.

— Ron Trembath, Scare Magazine

Those Who Walk Away is presented as one continuous shot. It has a singular aesthetic and the attention to detail is uncanny. It’s everything that found footage isn’t. It’s methodical, explicit, and seemingly unedited. The timing and synchronism are perplexing. There’s absolutely no way you can predict what the second half holds, so brace yourself. It’s a real treat, whether you’re paying attention to the story or projecting yourself behind the camera. Regardless of the angle, it’s nothing short of a masterpiece.

— Steve Hutchison, Tales of Terror

KTLA Morning News interviewed Robert Rippberger and Booboo Stewart about the theatrical release.
