= Thunderstruck (2012 film) =

- Theatrical release poster
- Directed by: John Whitesell
- Written by: Eric Champnella; Jeff Farley; Dominic Allen
- Produced by: Mike Karz
- Starring: Kevin Durant; Taylor Gray; Brandon T. Jackson; Doc Shaw; Jim Belushi
- Cinematography: Shawn Maurer
- Edited by: Tony Lombardo
- Music by: Ali Dee Theodore
- Production companies: Karz Entertainment; Goodwin Sports
- Distributed by: Warner Bros. Pictures (Note: Released under the Warner Premiere label.)
- Release date: August 24, 2012
- Running time: 94 minutes
- Country: United States
- Language: English
- Budget: $7 million
- Box office: $587,211

Thunderstruck is a 2012 American sports comedy film directed by John Whitesell and starring professional NBA player Kevin Durant and Taylor Gray as well as Brandon T. Jackson, Doc Shaw and Jim Belushi.

The plot follows a boy who magically gets Durant's basketball skills and the duo must figure out how to return them.

The film was released on August 24, 2012.

== Plot ==
16-year-old Brian Newall lives in Oklahoma. Although he has tried out for his school basketball team, the Eagles, he has never made it, relegated to being the water boy. While practicing at home, Brian's sister makes a videotape of him injuring himself. She shows the video around school on the TV, and it is eventually seen by Connor, the star player of the basketball team.

Brian is immediately interested in new student Isabelle, but is embarrassed when Connor shows the video of him to the whole school. In order to cheer him up, Brian's dad takes him to a Oklahoma City Thunder game against the New Orleans Hornets at Chesapeake Energy Arena in Oklahoma City.

At halftime, Brian is chosen to shoot a half-court shot, which he misses, hitting Rumble in the process. Later on, he meets Kevin Durant and expresses his desire to play just like him. Durant signs the special edition Oklahoma City Thunder basketball that Brian was given to shoot the half-court shot with. Suddenly, a surge of energy causes Durant's talent to transfer to Brian when he hands it over. The Thunder lose the game, with Durant shooting 0–13 in the 2nd half.

The next morning, Brian learns that Connor, who was at the game, recorded him missing the half-court shot and posted it online. Later that night he goes out to a carnival and sees Connor fail to hit shots to win a prize for Isabelle. Connor challenges Brian to "do better", which Brian is able to do, winning a prize for Isabelle. This infuriates Connor. Meanwhile, Durant's performance declines at practices, but insists he is only in a slump.

After making several impressive shots at home, Brian decides to try out for the Eagles again. The coach, impressed by Brian's new skill, has Brian replace Connor as the team captain, and they win several games. However, Connor begins to grow more jealous of Brian as Isabel doesn't pay much attention to him and Brian is dominating games on both sides of the ball.

Durant's agent Alan learns of Brian, and realizes that he is the same kid who missed the half-court shot. He tracks him down and explains that he believes Brian stole Durant's talent. Alan arranges for the two to practice together to try to reverse it, but all attempts fail.

Shortly before the final game, Brian and Isabelle begin to fight about how he has changed. Eventually, he goes to apologize and, while watching the video of him missing the half-court shot at her house, realizes what has to be done to give Durant his talent back.

Brian rides his bike all the way to Chesapeake Arena to find Durant. He explains that he hit Rumble before the transfer, and theorized that was what had to happen to reverse it. Brian hits Rumble with exactly the same ball he used to shoot the half-court shot, and then repeats the conversation that he had with Durant at their first meeting. Durant gets his talent back, so the Thunder qualify for the playoffs.

At the final game for the Eagles, Brian is nervous about playing because he no longer has the talent. Though he plays rather poorly, with help from the whole team, including Connor, he still manages to lead his team to a close game. Taking the final shot himself, the game-winning shot sends the Eagles to the state playoffs for the first time in 32 years.

Brian, who is gradually improving at basketball, is later seen playing with Durant.

== Cast ==
- Kevin Durant as himself
- Taylor Gray as Brian Newall
- Brandon T. Jackson as Alan, Kevin Durant's agent
- Doc Shaw as Mitch
- Jim Belushi as Coach Amross
- Tristin Mays as Isabelle
- Spencer Daniels as Connor, the star player of the Eagles
- Hana Hayes as Ashley Newall
- Robert Belushi as Assistant Coach Dan
- Brant Bentley as Chad
- Eric Montoya as Brad
- Candace Parker as herself
- William Ragsdale as Joe Newall
- Andrea Frankle as Math Teacher
- Beau Brasseaux as Drillers Basketball Player
- Glen Warner as Photographer
- Brie Lybrand as Isabel's Friend
- George Wilson as Janitor / Spider
- Sean Michael Cunningham as High School Announcer
- Lorrie Chilcoat as Security Guard
- Nicole Barré as Laurie Newell
- Marv Albert as himself
- Steve Kerr as himself
- Reggie Miller as himself
- Shaquille O’Neal as himself
- Oklahoma City Thunder players (including Russell Westbrook & James Harden)
- Charlotte Hornets players

== Production ==
While shooting the film, Durant said that the hardest part was not the acting, but rather that he had to miss jump shots on purpose for the film, to indicate that he no longer had the ability to play basketball as well as he used to.

== Reception ==
=== Box office ===
Thunderstruck received a limited theatrical release in the United States. During its only weekend of release, the film grossed $587,211 from 250 theaters, finishing 25th for the weekend. After the film's financial failure, Durant said he would never act again.

=== Critical reception ===
On Rotten Tomatoes the film holds an approval rating of 27% based on 11 reviews, with an average rating of 4.38/10.

== See also ==
- List of basketball films
