= Truth or Dare (2018 film) =

- Theatrical release poster
- Directed by: Jeff Wadlow
- Screenplay by: Michael Reisz; Jillian Jacobs; Chris Roach; Jeff Wadlow
- Story by: Michael Reisz
- Produced by: Jason Blum
- Starring: Lucy Hale; Tyler Posey; Violett Beane; Hayden Szeto; Landon Liboiron
- Cinematography: Jacques Jouffret
- Edited by: Sean Albertson
- Music by: Matthew Margeson
- Production company: Blumhouse Productions
- Distributed by: Universal Pictures
- Release date: April 13, 2018 (United States)
- Running time: 100 minutes
- Country: United States
- Language: English
- Budget: $3.5 million
- Box office: $95.3 million

Truth or Dare, also known as Blumhouse's Truth or Dare, is a 2018 American supernatural horror film directed and co-written (alongside Michael Reisz, Jillian Jacobs, and Chris Roach) by Jeff Wadlow. The film stars Lucy Hale, Tyler Posey, Violett Beane, Hayden Szeto, Sophia Taylor Ali, and Landon Liboiron as a group of college students who play a game of truth or dare while on vacation in Mexico, only to realize it has deadly consequences if they do not follow through on their obligations. Jason Blum produced through his Blumhouse Productions banner, and Universal Pictures distributed the film.

Released in theaters on Friday, April 13, 2018, the film received mostly negative reviews from critics, who said it was "neither inventive nor scary enough to set itself apart from the decades of dreary slashers that came before it." The film was a box office success, grossing $95 million worldwide against its $3.5 million production budget.

== Plot ==
A young woman in Mexico enters a gas station to buy cigarettes. The cashier takes a phone call and suddenly asks her, "Truth or dare?" in a demonic voice. The woman then uses lighter fluid to burn a woman alive.

College student Olivia Barron is convinced by her best friend, Markie Cameron, to come with her to Cancún for spring break. Alongside them are Markie's boyfriend, Lucas, whom Olivia has feelings for, and their friends Tyson, Brad, Penelope, and Ronnie. At a bar, Olivia meets Carter, who brings her and the group to the abandoned Rosarito Mission. Carter suggests they play truth or dare, where Tyson reveals Olivia's crush on Lucas. On his turn, Carter chooses truth and reveals that he was tasked with finding a group to play truth or dare. Before leaving, Carter tells Olivia that they must follow the rules of the game or they will die.

Back at school, Olivia hallucinates her classmates having demonic, grinning faces that ask her, "Truth or dare?" Olivia chooses truth, revealing that Markie habitually cheats on Lucas, fracturing their relationship. Meanwhile, Ronnie is killed for failing to complete a dare. During their turns, Markie breaks Olivia's hand, Brad is forced to come out to his father, and Tyson is killed for failing to tell the truth. The group comes across an article online about Giselle Hammond, the missing woman responsible for the murder in Mexico. Markie messages Giselle, threatening her family to arrange a meetup. During Penelope's turn, she is forced to do a dare despite choosing truth.

The group meets up with Giselle, who says that after her friend Sam drunkenly trashed the church, her group played a variation where truth cannot be chosen twice consecutively, and that Carter was dared to find a new group to play, thereby delaying their turns. Giselle draws a gun, accidentally killing Penelope while targeting Olivia. Lucas and Brad tackle Giselle, but she is possessed and commits suicide. Lucas and Markie find an article about a massacre at Rosarito Mission in the 1960s in which Inez Reyes was the sole survivor. Upstairs, Olivia is attacked by a possessed vagrant who dares her to sleep with Lucas. Markie storms off after Olivia reveals the dare. While having sex, Lucas is forced to reveal that he is in love with Markie, upsetting Olivia. Afterward, Lucas and Olivia visit Inez in Tijuana.

Inez, who has gone non-verbal, communicates that the priest who ran the convent routinely abused the girls. One of the girls summoned a demon named Calux, who committed the massacre. Inez gives them a spell that can stop Calux, but the person who released him must sacrifice their tongue. The two return home, and Brad is killed during his dare. Olivia is then forced to tell Markie her deepest secret: The night Markie's father committed suicide, Olivia threatened to expose him for attempting to sleep with her, and that she had told him that Markie would be better with him dead. A detective questions Olivia, revealing that Sam is Carter's real identity. Later that night, Olivia, Markie, and Lucas kidnap Sam back to Rosarito.

Olivia holds Sam at gunpoint and forces him to perform Inez's spell. Calux possesses Lucas, killing Sam and then himself before possessing Markie, telling Olivia that the game won't end until all players are dead. Hoping to delay their turn, Olivia takes out her phone and records a video recounting their story before asking, "Truth or dare?" exposing the world.

== Cast ==
- Lucy Hale as Olivia Barron
- Tyler Posey as Lucas Moreno
- Violett Beane as Markie Cameron
- Hayden Szeto as Brad Chang
- Landon Liboiron as Carter / Sam Meehan
- Sophia Taylor Ali as Penelope Amari
- Nolan Gerard Funk as Tyson Curran
- Sam Lerner as Ronnie
- Aurora Perrineau as Giselle Hammond
- Tom Choi as Officer Han Chang
- Joe Ochman as the voice of Callux
- Vera Taylor as Inez Reyes
  - Ezmie Garcia as young Inez Reyes
- Andrew Howard as Randall Himoff
- Gary Anthony Williams as the voice of the demon

== Production ==
=== Development ===
Initially, director Jeff Wadlow explained that he was hired to direct the film after spitballing an opening scene based on the film's title in his initial meetings with Blumhouse. Subsequently, he joined with his friend Chris Roach, and his wife, Jill Jacobs, and started thinking of ideas to approach the final concept.

=== Filming ===
Principal photography on the film began on June 7, 2017, and wrapped on July 12, 2017, in Los Angeles.

== Release ==
The film was initially set for release on April 27, 2018. But in January 2018, the date was moved up two weeks and premiered on April 13, 2018. The official trailer for the film was released on January 3, 2018.

== Reception ==
=== Box office ===
Truth or Dare grossed $41.4 million in the United States and Canada, and $53.9 million in other territories, for a worldwide total of $95.3 million, against a production budget of $3.5 million.

In the United States and Canada, the film was released alongside Rampage and Sgt. Stubby: An American Hero, as well as the wide expansion of Isle of Dogs, and was projected to gross $12–15 million from 3,029 theaters in its opening weekend. The film made $8.3 million on its first day (including $750,000 from Thursday night previews), $6.8 million on Saturday and a total of $18.7 million over the weekend, finishing third behind Rampage ($35.7 million) and fellow horror film A Quiet Place ($32.6 million). It fell to 58% in its second weekend, grossing $7.8 million and finishing fifth. The film continued to hold well in its third weekend, dropping 58% again to $3.3 million, finishing in seventh place.

=== Critical response ===
On review aggregator website Rotten Tomatoes, the film holds an approval rating of 15% based on 162 reviews, and an average rating of 3.8/10. The website's critical consensus reads, "Truth or Dare's slick presentation isn't enough to make this mediocre horror outing much more frightening than an average round of the real-life game." On Metacritic, the film has a weighted average score of 35 out of 100, based on 33 critics, indicating "generally unfavorable reviews". Audiences polled by CinemaScore gave the film an average grade of "B−" on an A+ to F scale.

Simon Abrams of RogerEbert.com gave the film two stars out of four and wrote that "director Jeff Wadlow and his three credited co-writers don't go far enough towards either of their film's primary impulses—humanizing their immature subjects and/or making them die amusingly sadistic deaths." Variety's Owen Gleiberman called it a "scare-free horror film" and wrote, "The movie isn't scary, it isn't gripping, it isn't fun, and it isn't fueled by any sort of clever compulsion. It's just a strangely arduous exercise that feels increasingly frantic and arbitrary as it goes along." Edward Porter of The Times gave the film 1/5 stars, saying that it was "not so much a horror show as a soap opera with a high mortality rate."

Simran Hans of The Observer gave the film 2/5 stars, writing: "This tepid teen horror from Blumhouse Productions is a disappointing backwards stumble for the indie company, given its recent track record of cheap but effective genre thrills such as Split and Happy Death Day (as well as the considerably higher profile Get Out)." Robbie Collin of The Daily Telegraph also gave the film 2/5 stars, describing it as "the kind of film that must have seemed like a good idea at the time, but its initially appealing premise... quickly falls to pieces under its own self-generated confusions." Geoffrey Macnab of The Independent also gave the film 2/5 stars, writing: "A few moments of ingenuity aside, Truth or Dare is lacklustre filmmaking. Its premise is so contrived that any attempts at stirring up dread or suspense are stifled at the outset."

Bruce DeMara of the Toronto Star gave the film 2.5/4 stars, saying that it "isn't all that daring, although it is not without its twisted charm." Benjamin Lee of The Guardian gave the film 3/5 stars, writing: "Hackneyed horror tropes persist throughout and so does some crushingly exposition-heavy dialogue... but it rattles along at a fair lick, never resting for too long before another nasty surprise."

== Accolades ==
The film was nominated at the 2018 Teen Choice Awards as Choice Drama Movie. Lucy Hale was also nominated as Choice Drama Movie Actress for her performance in this film.

== Cancelled sequel ==
In April 2018, Jeff Wadlow discussed ideas of a sequel, stating, "If the movie is a success and I'm asked to come up with other good ideas, there are other stories that could be told through the filter of a supernatural game of truth or dare." In February 2020, rumors emerged that Blumhouse Productions would develop a sequel. In February 2024, Wadlow said that while a script for a meta sequel had been written, revolving around the actual film's cast playing themselves, the project was canceled due to the COVID-19 pandemic.
