= Fingal Film Festival =

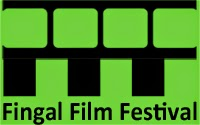
- Location: Swords, County Dublin, Ireland
- Founded: 2012
- Festival date: September/October
- Language: English, Irish and others
- Website: fingalfilmfest.com

Fingal Film Festival is held yearly in Swords, County Dublin, Ireland since 2012.

== Festival Awards ==
This film festival awards prizes in nine categories (up from 6 categories in the first edition). Past winners are listed below

=== 2012 ===
- Best International Film - Colmillo - Venezuela
- Best Feature Film - Where The Sea Used To Be - Ireland
- Best Documentary - Sunday In Brazzaville - Spain & Congo
- Best Animation - Pixelation Daydreams - Ireland
- Best Newcomer Writer in Fingal - Steven Murray (Situations Vacant) - Ireland
- Best Short Film - Two Hearts - Ireland

=== 2013 ===
- Best International Film - Substitute Teacher - Israel
- Best Animated Film - Luminaris - Spain & Argentina
- Best Short Film -Is This It? - Ireland
- Best Feature Film - The Pier - Ireland
- Best Documentary Film - Beyond Right and Wrong - USA
- Best Newcomer Director/Writer in Fingal - Special Delivery - Ireland
- Best Student Film/Doc/Animation - Kill Screen (BCFE) - Ireland

=== 2014 ===
- Best Feature Film - Calloused Hands - UK/USA
- Best Documentary Feature - Dah života - Bosnia
- Best International Film - Electric Indigo - Belgium
- Best Student Film - I've Been a Sweeper (DIT/FN) - Ireland
- Best Irish Language Film - Barróg Béir - Ireland
- Best Animation Film - Shoot - Ireland
- Best Short Film - Skunky Dog - Ireland
- Best Fingal Newcomer - Volkswagen Joe - Ireland

=== 2015 ===
- Best International Film - Er und Sie - Germany
- Best Short Film - Solitaire - Ireland
- Best Feature Film - The Kids from the Marx and Engels Street - Montenegro
- Best Student Film - The Hiding (DIT) - Ireland
- Best Fingal Newcomer - Brenda - Ireland
- Best Animation - Deadly - Ireland
- Best Documentary - Where my Ladies? - Ireland
- Best Irish Language Film - An Cat - Ireland
- Outstanding Achievement in Media - 7 Days in Syria - USA

=== 2016 ===
- Best 1916 Short - Proclaim! - Ireland
- Best Short Film - Deirdre - Ireland
- Best Feature Film - South - Ireland
- Best Student Film - Rapto - Ireland
- Best Fingal Newcomer - Cousins - Ireland
- Best Animation - Little Flower- Ireland
- Best Documentary - Murphy's Law - Canada
- Scannán na hÉireann - Maidhm - Ireland

Outstanding Achievement in Media - In Dialogue - USA

== Awards ==
=== Fingal Community Award ===
Fingal Film Festival Winners of the Fingal Community Award in the Arts and Culture Category 2013 Ireland

=== Irelands Event Industry Awards ===
Short Listed for Irelands Event Industry Awards 2013 & 2015
