= Jim Capobianco =

American film director, animator and screenwriter

- Born: 1969 (age 56–57); Saddle Brook, New Jersey, United States
- Education: California Institute of the Arts
- Occupations: Film director; screenwriter; animator; story artist; storyboard artist
- Years active: 1989–present
- Website: www.jimcapobianco.com

Jim Capobianco (born 1969) is an American film director, animator and screenwriter. He has worked as a story artist and storyboard artist for films such as The Lion King (1994), Hunchback of Notre Dame (1996), A Bug's Life (1998), Toy Story 2 (1999), Monsters, Inc. (2001), Finding Nemo (2003), Up (2009), Inside Out (2015), and Finding Dory (2016).

In 2008, he was nominated for an Academy Award for Best Original Screenplay for Ratatouille (2007). In 2023, he wrote and directed the animated feature film The Inventor, about Leonardo da Vinci's life in France.

== Career ==
Raised in Saddle Brook, New Jersey, Capobianco attended Saddle Brook High School.

A graduate of the California Institute of the Arts, Capobianco started in the story department at Walt Disney Feature Animation on The Lion King (1994). He then worked on the storyboards for Hunchback of Notre Dame (1999) and Fantasia 2000 (1999). Capobianco has also worked for Pixar, on storyboards for films such as A Bug's Life (1998), Toy Story 2 (1999), Monsters, Inc. (2001), Finding Nemo (2003), Up (2009), Inside Out (2015), and Finding Dory (2016).

In 2007, he wrote and directed the animated short film Your Friend the Rat, and co-wrote the screenplay for the feature film Ratatouille, which earned him a nomination for the Academy Award for Best Original Screenplay.

In 2009, Capobianco co-founded with Shelley Trott the Bay Area International Children's Film Festival. That same year, he directed Leonardo, a short film about Leonardo da Vinci, now in the permanent collection of the MoMA NYC.

With Aerial Contrivance Workshop, Capobianco was the 2D animation sequence director for Walt Disney Motion Pictures' Mary Poppins Returns (2018), and also wrote and directed the 2023 stop-motion animated feature film The Inventor, a continuation of his short Leonardo, focused on the end of Leonardo da Vinci's life in France.

== Filmography ==
=== Aerial Contrivance Workshop ===
- 2009: Leonardo (short film) - writer, director and producer
- 2009: How To be a Good Bagger - writer and director
- 2018: Mary Poppins Returns - Animation Sequence Director
- 2022: Philharmonia Fantastique - story and animation director
- 2023: The Inventor - writer, director and producer

==== As animator ====
- 1989: Baby's Bedtime

=== Netflix Animation ===
- 2020: Go Go Cory Carson - voice of Gary Garbage Truck

=== Pixar ===
- 1998: A Bug's Life - story artist
- 1999: Toy Story 2 - story artist
- 2001: Monsters, Inc. - story artist
- 2003: Finding Nemo - story artist
- 2007: Ratatouille - writer / story-supervisor
- 2007: Your Friend the Rat - writer / director
- 2008: Wall•E - directed the end credits
- 2009: Up - story artist
- 2015: Inside Out - story artist
- 2016: Finding Dory - story artist
- 2017: Coco - storyboards

=== Cartoon Saloon ===
- 2014: Song of the Sea - story consultant
- 2017: Breadwinner - story consultant
- 2020: Wolfwalkers - story consultant

=== Disney Feature Animation ===
- 1994: The Lion King - storyboards
- 1996: Hunchback of Notre Dame - storyboards
- 1999: Fantasia 2000 - storyboards

== Awards and nominations ==
Award / Festival	Year	Category	Nominated work	Result	Ref(s)
Online Film & Television Association Awards	2007	Best Original Screenplay	Ratatouille	Nominated	
Academy Awards	2008	Best Original Screenplay	Ratatouille	Nominated	
Annie Awards	2008	Best Animated Short Subject	Your Friend the Rat	Won	
Latino Entertainment Journalists Association Awards	2019	Best Visual Effects	Mary Poppins Returns	Nominated	
Annecy International Animation Film Festival	2023	Best Feature Film	The Inventor	Nominated	
