= Maktab al-Nasser prison =

Prison in Tripoli, Libya

Coordinates: 32°54′8″N 13°11′9″E

Maktab al-Nasser prison is a prison in the Abu Salim district of Tripoli, Libya. Prior to the fall of Muammar Gaddafi's government in the 2011 Libyan civil war, it served as a prison and office of the internal security agency. Many of the prisoners held there would often be later transferred to Abu Salim prison.
