= Karen Bandeen-Roche =

American biostatistician

- Born: November 23, 1964 (age 61); Washington, D.C.
- Education: BA, mathematics, Andrews University; MSc, PhD, Cornell University
- Spouse: William J. Roche
- Scientific career
- Workplaces: Johns Hopkins Bloomberg School of Public Health
- Thesis: A receptor-based model for the statistical analysis of air pollution data: Source apportionment with one source unknown (1990)
- Website: www.biostat.jhsph.edu/~kbroche/

Karen Jean Bandeen-Roche (born November 23, 1964) is an American biostatistician. She was the Hurley Dorrier Professor of Biostatistics and Chair of the Biostatistics Department at the Johns Hopkins Bloomberg School of Public Health from 2008 to 2023. Bandeen-Roche is known for her research on aging and aging-related frailty.

== Early life and education ==
Bandeen-Roche was born on November 23, 1964, in Washington, D.C. but was raised primarily in Maryland. Her father William R. Bandeen was an atmospheric physicist. Bandeen-Roche earned a Bachelor of Arts degree in mathematics at Andrews University before enrolling at Cornell University for her Master of Science degree and PhD in operations research. While at Andrews, Bandeen-Roche was named a National Merit scholar. Her PhD dissertation, supervised by David Ruppert, was entitled A Receptor-Based Model for the Statistical Analysis of Air Pollution Data: Source Apportionment with One Source Unknown. Bandeen-Roche received Cornell University's Distinguished Alumni award in 2023.

== Career ==
Bandeen-Roche joined the faculty at Johns Hopkins Bloomberg School of Public Health in 1990 and became a Full professor in the Department of Biostatistics in 2002. During this time, she co-authored "Visual Impairment and Disability in Older Adults," which received the 2000 Garland W. Clay Award from the American Academy of Optometry as the most cited paper in the field over five years. She was also elected a Fellow of the American Statistical Association for "fundamental research on biostatistical methods, especially for latent variables, and for important contributions to epidemiology, ophthalmology and geriatrics." Outside of Johns Hopkins, Bandeen-Roche was elected secretary of the International Biometric Society's Eastern North American Region and appointed chair of the National Institutes of Health's Biostatistical Methods and Research Design Study Section.

Bandeen-Roche was appointed the interim chair of the Department of Biostatistics on July 1, 2008. She was then formally installed as the Frank Hurley and Catharine Dorrier Professor and Chair of the Department of Biostatistics on March 31, 2009. She also served as director of the Johns Hopkins Alzheimer's Disease Research Center Data Management and Statistics Core and the Epidemiology and Biostatistics of Aging Training Program and deputy director of the Johns Hopkins Institute for Clinical and Translational Research. In 2016, Bandeen-Roche was recognized with the Marvin Zelen Leadership Award in Statistical Science by the Harvard T.H. Chan School of Public Health.

Bandeen-Roche was elected a Member of the National Academy of Medicine in 2023 for using "statistical reasoning to find ways to lengthen healthy life and increase independence for older adults."
