= Violett Beane =

American actress

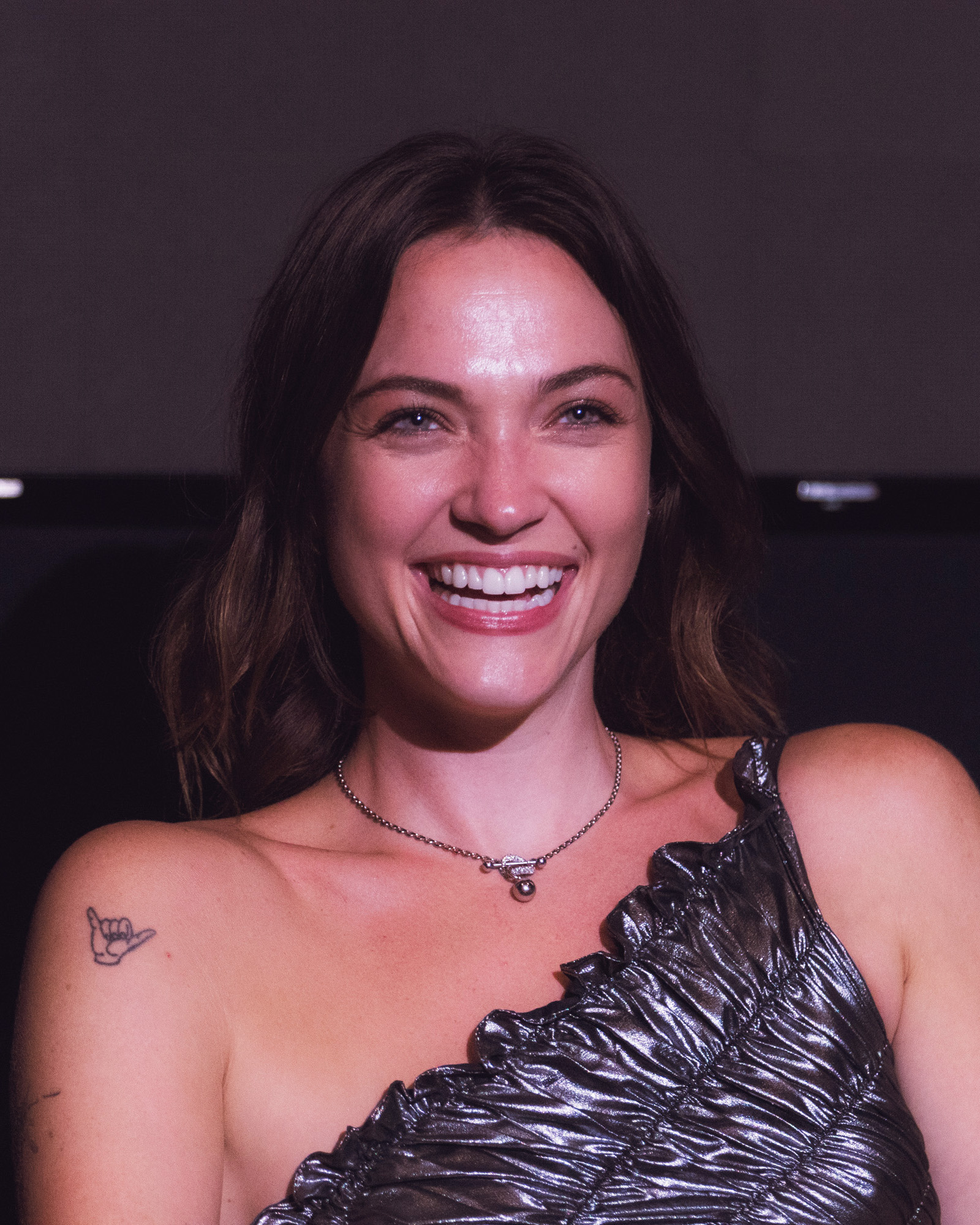
- Beane in 2025
- Born: May 18, 1996 (age 30); St. Petersburg, Florida, U.S.
- Occupation: Actress
- Years active: 2015–present

Violett Beane (born May 18, 1996) is an American actress. She played Jesse Wells/Jesse Quick in The CW's The Flash, as well as Markie Cameron in the 2018 horror film Truth or Dare. From 2018 to 2020, she starred as Cara Bloom in the CBS television series God Friended Me. She later starred as Imogene Scott in the Hulu mystery series Death and Other Details (2024) and as Evan Shepherd in the Prime Video crime series Countdown (2025).

== Early life ==
Beane was born May 18, 1996, in St. Petersburg, Florida. At ten years old, she moved to Austin, Texas, where she grew up and which she considers her hometown. After moving to Austin, Beane fell in love with performing and studied drama throughout middle and high school. She completed her schooling at McCallum High School in Austin, Texas. Though Beane always felt like she was meant to perform, it was not until her senior year of high school that she focused on acting professionally and found an agent in Austin.

Beane was raised by her parents as a Quaker as she mentioned in an interview on ONTVtoday: "I was raised Quaker, and I went to meetings every Sunday for most of my childhood."

== Career ==
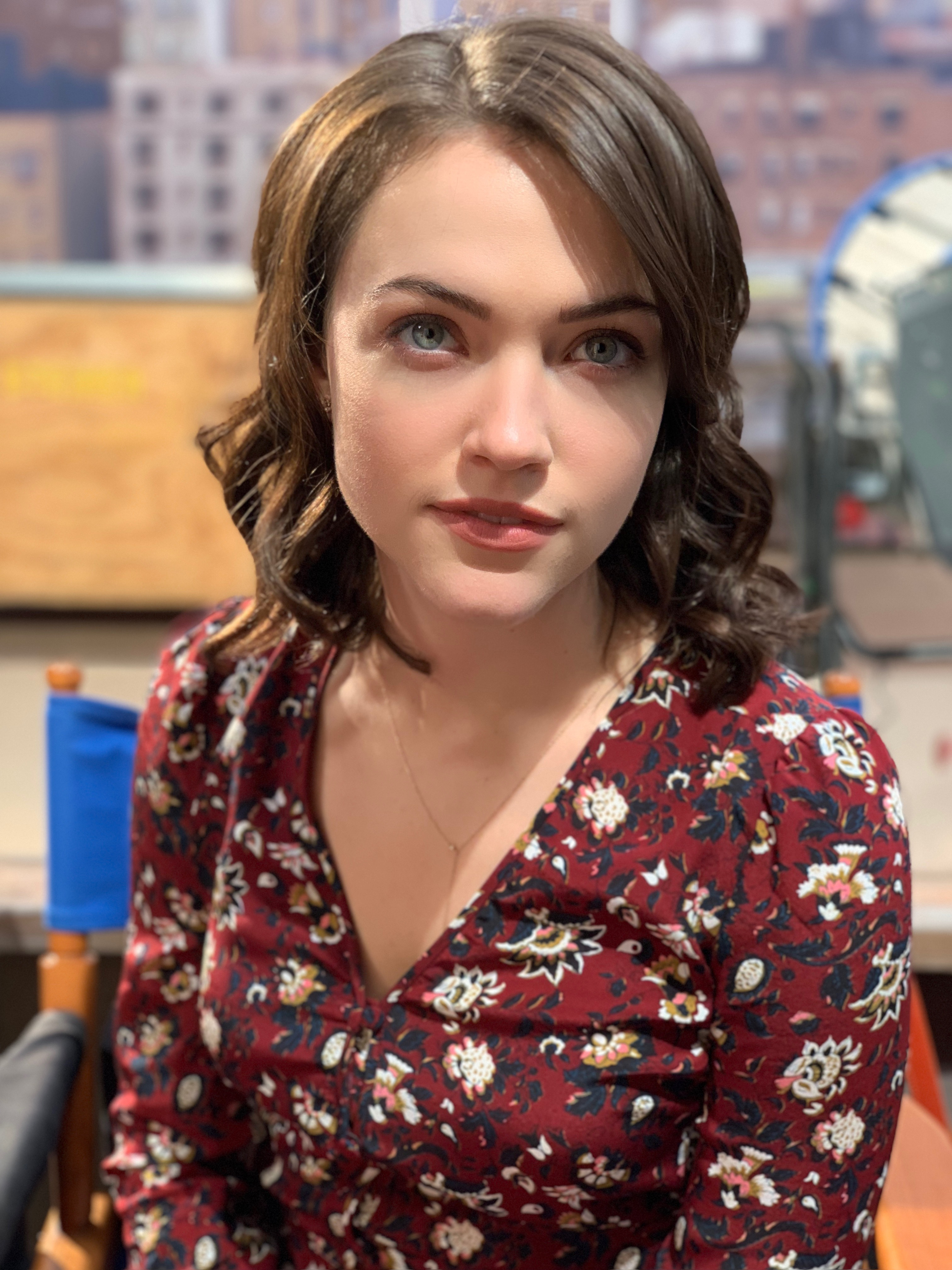
Beane in 2019

In 2015, Beane landed a recurring role in season 2 of HBO series The Leftovers. Beane played Taylor Truitt, a local girl in Jarden, Texas, who went missing along with two other girls.

Following The Leftovers, Beane was cast in The CW's superhero drama The Flash as Jesse Wells (nicknamed "Jesse Quick"), the daughter of Earth-2 Harrison Wells (Tom Cavanagh). Jesse is a bright college student who gets caught in the battle between The Flash (Barry Allen) and Zoom. In The Flash comics, Jesse Quick is a speedster who becomes the partner of Wally West (played on The Flash by Keiynan Lonsdale). Beane returned as Jesse in season 3 of the show.

Beane had a recurring role in the Fox medical drama series The Resident as Lily, a cancer patient under the care of Dr. Conrad Hawkins (Matt Czuchry) and Dr. Devon Pravesh (Manish Dayal). Abandoned by her fiancé and far from home, Lily inspires the hospital staff to be protective and emotionally involved in her outcome. The course of her treatment was determined by oncologist, Dr. Lane Hunter (Melina Kanakaredes).

Beane's film credits include the indie horror film Flay, Slash, and the documentary Tower, which focuses on the University of Texas at Austin shooting in 1966, which was the first mass school shooting in the United States. In Tower, Beane portrays Claire Wilson, who was eight months pregnant during the shooting and lost her unborn baby and boyfriend that day.

In May 2017, Beane was cast as Markie Cameron in the Blumhouse supernatural thriller film Truth or Dare, which was released in theaters on April 13, 2018. From 2018 to 2020, Beane starred in the CBS television series God Friended Me opposite Brandon Micheal Hall.

== Personal life ==
Beane is vegan and posed nude for PETA in support of that lifestyle. Beane moved to New York City to film God Friended Me.

== Filmography ==
Film roles
Year	Title	Role	Notes
2016	Slash	Lindsay	
2016	Tower	Claire Wilson	Animated documentary film
2018	Truth or Dare	Markie Cameron	
2019	Flay	Bethany	
2025	Renner	Jamie	
2025	Drop	Jen Gates	

Television roles
Year	Title	Role	Notes
2015	The Leftovers	Taylor	Recurring role, 5 episodes
2015–2018	The Flash	Jesse Wells / Jesse Quick	Recurring role (seasons 2–4), 21 episodes
2016	Chicago P.D.	Maya Collins	Episode: "Some Friend"
2018	The Resident	Lily Kendall	Recurring role (season 1), 8 episodes
2018	Legends of Tomorrow	Jesse Wells	Episode: "Necromancing the Stone"
2018–2020	God Friended Me	Cara Bloom	Main role
2024	Death and Other Details	Imogene Scott	Lead role
2025	Countdown	Evan Shepherd	Main role
