= 7 Days in Syria =

2015 film

- Theatrical release poster
- Directed by: Robert Rippberger
- Produced by: Janine di Giovanni, Robert Rippberger, Scott Rosenfelt, Matthew VanDyke, Angelina Jolie (Executive Producer)
- Starring: Janine di Giovanni, Nicole Tung, Steven Sotloff, James Foley
- Cinematography: Patrick Wells, Matthew VanDyke
- Edited by: Gabriel Cullen
- Music by: R. B. Music Group
- Production companies: Aletheia Films, Cinema Vertitas
- Distributed by: Ro*co Films, Gunpowder & Sky
- Release date: September 19, 2015 (Awareness Film Festival)
- Running time: 75 minutes
- Country: United States
- Languages: English, Arabic

7 Days in Syria is a 2015 American documentary film directed and produced by Robert Rippberger. Filmed in November 2012, it captures the human side of war and what life is like in Syria for the millions trying to escape. The film played in over 50 cities worldwide (including Los Angeles, San Francisco, Washington D.C., New York, Toronto, London, Paris, Dublin, Norrkoping, Amsterdam, and Sydney), The film was released internationally by Ro*co films, throughout North America by Gunpowder & Sky, by Gathr films for theatrical-on-demand, and online through Hulu.

== Synopsis ==
7 Days in Syria is a portrayal of the human side of war. The film looks out the people of Aleppo, chronicling the civilians keeping the city running, providing bread, administering medical supplies, burying dead bodies, and those internally documenting the atrocities for posterity and war tribunals.

== Reception ==
=== Critical response ===
The "Moderate Voice" gave it 5 stars writing:

If you could make a documentary required viewing, 7 Days in Syria would be it.

DC FilmDom gave it 5 stars and wrote:

Beyond sobering, filmmaker Robert Rippberger's snapshot of the ongoing Syrian Civil War brings the conflict unprecedented visibility via war journalist and Middle East specialist Janine di Giovanni.
