= Sommer Gentry =

American mathematician

Sommer Elizabeth Gentry is an American mathematician who works as a professor of mathematics at the United States Naval Academy and as a research associate in surgery at the Johns Hopkins School of Medicine. Her research concerns operations research and its applications to the optimization of organ transplants, and has led to the discovery of geographic inequities in organ allocation. She is also interested in dancing, teaches swing dancing at the Naval Academy, and wrote her doctoral dissertation on the mathematics and robotics of dance.

== Early life and education ==
Gentry is originally from California. As a girl, she was inspired to continue in mathematics by the recreational mathematics columns of Martin Gardner and Ivars Peterson. In 1993, as a senior at Thousand Oaks High School, Gentry had the highest individual score at the Ventura County, California county-level Academic Decathlon. She graduated from Stanford University in 1998, with both a bachelor's degree in mathematical and computational sciences and a master's degree in engineering-economic systems and operations research.

She completed her Ph.D. in electrical engineering and computer science at the Massachusetts Institute of Technology in 2005. Her dissertation, Dancing cheek to cheek: haptic communication between partner dancers and swing as a finite state machine, was supervised by Eric Feron. In her doctoral research, she modeled the language and notation of dance mathematically using finite-state machines, programmed a robot to dance, and used her model to improve haptic communications between humans and robots, with the goal of eventually producing human-machine surgical collaborations that could be more effective than human or robotic surgeons working alone.

== Other activities ==
Gentry is married to Israeli surgeon Dorry Segev. She met him at a Lindy Hop dance competition in 1999, and a few years later they won the British Championship in Lindy Hop. She has also worked with Segev on the Kidney Paired Donation program.

In 2017, Gentry was a competitor on the Fox Television game show Superhuman.

She has also been a vocal critic of the airport passenger screening procedures of the US Transportation Security Administration, which she characterizes as sexual assault.

== Recognition ==
Gentry won the Henry L. Alder Award for Distinguished Teaching by a Beginning Faculty Member of the Mathematical Association of America in 2009. She won the Navy Meritorious Civilian Service Award in 2014, and in the same year was a finalist for the INFORMS Daniel H. Wagner Prize for Excellence in Operations Research Practice. She will deliver a Mathematical Association of America (MAA) invited lecture at MathFest 2021.
