= Doc LA - Los Angeles Documentary Film Festival =

DOC LA — Los Angeles Documentary Film Festival is an international documentary film festival in Hollywood, California. It is organized by Parajanov-Vartanov Institute in Los Angeles. The festival aims to present films by American and International students, emerging auteurs and established masters, especially those that the city's other important film festivals overlook. While its primary focus is documentary and short films, DocLA selects and awards films of all genres, including fiction, animation and experimental works. The festival was noted for showcasing and awarding movies by women directors, and foreign language cinema, alongside independent American documentary films
