= List of Polish actors =

This is a partial list of notable Polish or Polish-speaking or -writing actors.

== A ==
- Piotr Adamczyk
- Aniela Aszpergerowa

== B ==
- Alicja Bachleda-Curuś, Polish actress, born in Mexico
- Andrzej Bartkowiak
- Magdalena Boczarska
- Eugeniusz Bodo
- Wojciech Bogusławski
- Tomasz Borkowy
- Przemysław Branny, Polish actor, born in Czechoslovakia
- Barbara Brylska

== C ==
- Zbigniew Cybulski
- Mieczysława Ćwiklińska
- Elżbieta Czyżewska

== D ==
- Ewa Demarczyk
- Dagmara Domińczyk

== F ==
- Katarzyna Figura
- Małgorzata Foremniak
- Piotr Fronczewski

== G ==
- Janusz Gajos
- Karolina Gruszka

== H ==
- Loda Halama
- Leontyna Halpertowa
- Adam Hanuszkiewicz
- Antonina Hoffmann
- Gustaw Holoubek

== J ==
- Krystyna Janda
- Stefan Jaracz
- Józef Cornobis
- Josef Josephi

== K ==
- Janina Klimkiewicz
- Jacek Koman
- Joanna Krupa
- Joanna Kulig
- Irena Kwiatkowska

== L ==
- Bogusław Linda
- Tadeusz Łomnicki

== M ==
- Agnieszka Maciąg
- Maria Malanowicz-Niedzielska
- Izabella Miko
- Helena Modjeska

== N ==
- Pola Negri
- Jacek Nieżychowski

== O ==
- Daniel Olbrychski

== P ==
- Joanna Pacuła
- Ludwika Paleta, Polish-Mexican actress
- Dominika Paleta, Polish-Mexican actress
- Cezary Pazura
- Marianna Franciszka Pierożyńska
- Ingrid Pitt
- Roman Polanski
- Beata Poźniak
- Jeremi Przybora
- Anna Przybylska
- Wojciech Pszoniak

== R ==
- Magdalena Różczka

== S ==
- Izabella Scorupco
- Andrzej Seweryn
- Tadeusz Skarzyński
- Yvonne Strahovski, Australian television, film, and voice actress of Polish descent
- Jerzy Stuhr

== T ==
- Stanisław Tym

== U ==
- Natasza Urbańska

== W ==
- Mia Wasikowska, Polish-Australian actress
- Jerzy Wasowski, Polish composer, pianist, and actor
- Roman Wilhelmi
- Lidia Wysocka

== Z ==
- Zbigniew Zamachowski
- Michał Żebrowski
- Artur Żmijewski

== See also ==
- List of Polish films
- List of Polish people
- Lists of actors
