= Taniec z gwiazdami season 4 =

Taniec z gwiazdami
- Season 4
- Hosted by: Hubert Urbański; Katarzyna Skrzynecka
- Judges: Iwona Pavlović; Piotr Galiński; Beata Tyszkiewicz; Zbigniew Wodecki
- Celebrity winner: Kinga Rusin
- Professional winner: Stefano Terrazzino
- No. of episodes: 10

Release
- Original network: TVN
- Original release: 10 September – 12 November 2006

Season chronology
- ← Previous; Season 3 Next → Season 5

The 4th season of Taniec z Gwiazdami, the Polish edition of Dancing With the Stars, started on 10 September 2006 and ended on 12 November 2006. It was broadcast by TVN. Katarzyna Skrzynecka and Hubert Urbański continued as the hosts, and the judges were: Iwona Szymańska-Pavlović, Zbigniew Wodecki, Beata Tyszkiewicz and Piotr Galiński.

On 12 November, Kinga Rusin and her partner Stefano Terrazzino were crowned the champions.

== Couples ==
Celebrity	Notability	Professional partner	Status
Michał Milowicz	Actor and singer	Izabela Mika	Eliminated 1st on 17 September 2006
Kaja Paschalska	Klan actress and singer	Piotr Kiszka	Eliminated 2nd on 24 September 2006
Magdalena Wójcik	Film and television actress	Robert Rowiński	Eliminated 3rd on 1 October 2006
Maria Wiktoria Wałęsa	Lech Wałęsa's daughter	Paweł Godek	Eliminated 4th on 8 October 2006
Przemysław Cypryański	M jak miłość actor	Aneta Piotrowska	Eliminated 5th on 15 October 2006
Joanna Liszowska	Film and television actress	Robert Kochanek	Eliminated 6th on 22 October 2006
Przemysław Sadowski	Film and television actor	Ewa Szabatin	Eliminated 7th on 29 October 2006
Marcin Mroczek	M jak miłość actor	Edyta Herbuś	Third place on 5 November 2006
Peter J. Lucas	Film and television actor	Dominika Kublik-Marzec	Runners-up on 12 November 2006
Kinga Rusin	TVN presenter	Stefano Terrazzino	Winners on 12 November 2006

== Scores ==
Couple	Place	1	2	1+2	3	4	5	6	7	8	9	10
Kinga & Stefano	1	26	35	61	29	36†	32	31	33	38+40=78†	37+37=74†	38+35+40=113
Peter & Dominika	2	32†	36†	68†	36†	28	36	30‡	36	32+38=70‡	33+39=72	38+37+38=113
Marcin & Edyta	3	29	34	63	29	27‡	35	35	32‡	34+36=70‡	38+33=71‡	
Przemysław & Ewa	4	30	31	61	31	35	40†	40†	38†	37+38=75		
Joanna & Robert	5	31	31	62	36†	33	30‡	35	38†			
Przemysław & Aneta	6	30	36†	66	31	29	32	33				
Maria & Paweł	7	32†	26‡	58	33	30	30‡					
Magdalena & Robert	8	29	31	60	29	33						
Kaja & Piotr	9	25	32	57	26‡							
Michał & Izabela	10	22‡	28	50‡								

Red numbers indicate the lowest score for each week.
Green numbers indicate the highest score for each week.
indicates the couple eliminated that week.
indicates the returning couple that finished in the bottom two.
indicates the winning couple of the week.
indicates the runner-up of the week.

Notes:

Week 1: Maria Wałęsa and Peter J. Lucas scored 32 out of 40 on their first dance (Waltz), making it the highest score in this episode. Michał Milowicz got 22 points for his Cha-cha-cha, making it the lowest score of the week and this season. There was no elimination this week.

Week 2: Peter J. Lucas and Przemysław Cypryański scored 36 out of 40 on their second dance. It was the highest score ever in Week 2. Maria Wałęsa got 26 points for her Rumba, making it the lowest score of the week. Michał & Izabela were eliminated despite being 2 points from the bottom.

Week 3: Joanna Liszowska and Peter J. Lucas scored 36 out of 40 on their third dance. Kaja Paschalska got 26 points for her Tango, making it the lowest score of the week. Kaja & Piotr were eliminated.

Week 4: Kinga Rusin scored 36 out of 40 on her 4th dance (Paso Doble), making it the highest score in this episode. Marcin Mroczek got 27 points for his Foxtrot, making it the lowest score of the week. Magdalena & Robert were eliminated despite being 6 points from the bottom.

Week 5: Przemysław Sadowski received the first perfect score of the season for his Jive. Maria Wałęsa & Joanna Liszowska got 30 points for their Jive, making it the lowest score of the week. Maria & Paweł were eliminated.

Week 6: All couples danced to Polish songs. Przemysław Sadowski received his second perfect score for the Quickstep. Peter J. Lucas got 30 points for his Quickstep, making it the lowest score of the week. Przemysław & Aneta were eliminated despite being 3 points from the bottom.

Week 7: All couples danced to the most famous songs of Elvis Presley. Joanna Liszowska and Przemysław Sadowski scored 38 out of 40 on their 7th dance, making it the highest score in this episode. Marcin Mroczek got 32 points for his Tango, making it the lowest score of the week. Joanna & Robert were eliminated despite having highest score from the jury.

Week 8: All couples danced to rock songs. Kinga Rusin received her first perfect score for the Rumba. Marcin Mroczek and Peter J. Lucas got 70 out of 80 points, making it the lowest score of the week. Przemysław & Ewa were eliminated despite being 5 points from the bottom.

Week 9: All couples danced to classic songs. Peter J. Lucas scored 39 out of 40, making it the highest score in this episode. Marcin & Edyta were eliminated.

Week 10: Kinga Rusin received her second perfect score for the Freestyle. Both Kinga Rusin and Peter J. Lucas got 113 out of 120 points. It was the first time a finalist didn't score 40 points for the Freestyle (Lucas got 38 points). Kinga Rusin became the 4th winner in the history of the show. This is the first time the season's winner was on the third place on the judges' general scoreboard and the first time the winner was not on the first place according to the judges' scoreboard.

== Average chart ==
Rank by average	Place	Team	Average	Total	Best Score	Worst Score
1.	4.	Przemysław Sadowski & Ewa Szabatin	36	320	40	30
2.	2.	Peter J. Lucas & Dominika Kublik-Marzec	35	489	39	28
3.	1.	Kinga Rusin & Stefano Terrazzino	35	487	40	26
4.	5.	Joanna Liszowska & Robert Kochanek	33	234	38	30
5.	3.	Marcin Mroczek & Edyta Herbuś	33	362	38	27
6.	6.	Przemysław Cypryański & Aneta Piotrowska	32	191	36	29
7.	8.	Magdalena Wójcik & Robert Rowiński	31	122	33	29
8.	7.	Maria Wiktoria Wałęsa & Paweł Godek	30	151	32	26
9.	9.	Kaja Paschalska & Piotr Kiszka	28	83	32	25
10.	10.	Michał Milowicz & Izabela Mika	25	50	28	22
Everyteam			32	2489		

== Average dance chart ==
Couples	Averages	Best Dances	Worst Dances
Przemysław & Ewa	35.5	Jive, Quickstep (40)	Waltz (30)
Peter & Dominika	34.9	Tango (39)	Paso Doble (28)
Kinga & Stefano	34.7	Rumba, Freestyle (40)	Waltz (26)
Joanna & Robert	33.4	Waltz (38)	Jive (30)
Marcin & Edyta	32.9	Waltz (38)	Foxtrot (27)
Przemysław & Aneta	31.8	Quickstep (36)	Foxtrot (29)
Magdalena & Robert	30.5	Foxtrot (33)	Cha-Cha-Cha, Samba (29)
Maria & Paweł	30.2	Tango (33)	Rumba (26)
Kaja & Piotr	27.6	Rumba (32)	Waltz (25)
Michał & Izabela	25.0	Quickstep (28)	Cha-Cha-Cha (22)

== Highest and lowest scoring performances ==
The best and worst performances in each dance according to the judges' marks are as follows:

Dance	Best dancer	Best score	Worst dancer	Worst score
Cha-Cha-Cha	Przemysław Sadowski	38	Michał Milowicz	22
Waltz	Joanna Liszowska; Marcin Mroczek	38	Kaja Paschalska	25
Quickstep	Przemysław Sadowski	40	Michał Milowicz	28
Rumba	Kinga Rusin	40	Maria Wiktoria Wałęsa	26
Jive	Przemysław Sadowski	40	Joanna Liszowska; Maria Wiktoria Wałęsa	30
Tango	Peter J. Lucas	39	Kaja Paschalska	26
Foxtrot	Przemysław Sadowski	37	Marcin Mroczek	27
Paso Doble	Kinga Rusin	38	Peter J. Lucas	28
Samba	Joanna Liszowska	36	Marcin Mroczek; Magdalena Wójcik	29
Freestyle	Kinga Rusin	40	Peter J. Lucas	38

== Episodes ==
Individual judges scores in charts below (given in parentheses) are listed in this order from left to right: Iwona Pavlović, Zbigniew Wodecki, Beata Tyszkiewicz, Piotr Galiński.

=== Week 1 ===
Running order

Couple	Score	Style	Music
Joanna & Robert	31 (7,8,9,7)	Cha-Cha-Cha	"Venus" — Shocking Blue
Kinga & Stefano	26 (5,8,7,6)	Waltz	"I Wonder Why"—Curtis Stigers
Michał & Izabela	22 (4,7,7,4)	Cha-Cha-Cha	"Lady (Hear Me Tonight)" — Modjo
Peter & Dominika	32 (7,8,9,8)	Waltz	"Speak Softly Love" — Andy Williams
Przemysław & Aneta	30 (7,8,8,7)	Cha-Cha-Cha	"Celebration" — Kool & the Gang
Maria & Paweł	32 (7,8,9,8)	Waltz	"Nie opuszczaj mnie" — Irena Jarocka
Magdalena & Robert	29 (6,8,8,7)	Cha-Cha-Cha	"When You're Gone" — Bryan Adams & Melanie C
Przemysław & Ewa	30 (6,8,9,7)	Waltz	"Just Once" — James Ingram & Quincy Jones
Marcin & Edyta	29 (6,8,9,6)	Cha-Cha-Cha	"I Will Survive" — Gloria Gaynor
Kaja & Piotr	25 (5,7,8,5)	Waltz	"You Light Up My Life" — Debby Boone

=== Week 2 ===
Running order

Couple	Score	Style	Music
Przemysław & Ewa	31 (7,9,8,7)	Rumba	"Shape of My Heart"—Sting
Michał & Izabela	28 (5,8,9,6)	Quickstep	"Sparkling Diamonds"—Marilyn Monroe
Kaja & Piotr	32 (7,8,9,8)	Rumba	"The Most Beautiful Girl in the World"—Prince
Marcin & Edyta	34 (8,9,9,8)	Quickstep	"Le Jazz Hot!"—Julie Andrews
Maria & Paweł	26 (4,8,8,6)	Rumba	"The Lady in Red"—Chris de Burgh
Przemysław & Aneta	36 (9,9,9,9)	Quickstep	"I'm Sitting on Top of the World"—Frank Sinatra
Kinga & Stefano	35 (8,9,9,9)	Rumba	"Senza una donna"—Zucchero & Paul Young
Joanna & Robert	31 (6,9,9,7)	Quickstep	"Mr. Pinstripe Suit"—Big Bad Voodoo Daddy
Peter & Dominika	36 (9,9,9,9)	Rumba	"Tears in Heaven"—Eric Clapton
Magdalena & Robert	31 (5,9,9,8)	Quickstep	"No Me Voy Sin Bailar"—Ana Belén

=== Week 3 ===
Running order

Couple	Score	Style	Music
Kinga & Stefano	29 (6,8,8,7)	Tango	"Tango D'Amore" — Rocco Granata
Marcin & Edyta	29 (6,8,9,6)	Samba	"Soy" — Gipsy Kings
Przemysław & Ewa	31 (7,8,9,7)	Tango	"Objection (Tango)" — Shakira
Joanna & Robert	36 (8,9,9,10)	Samba	"Conga" — Gloria Estefan
Maria & Paweł	33 (8,8,9,8)	Tango	"Buonasera Signorina" — Fred Buscaglione
Przemysław & Aneta	31 (7,8,8,8)	Samba	"Mas que Nada" — Jorge Ben
Peter & Dominika	36 (9,9,9,9)	Tango	"To ostatnia niedziela" — Mieczysław Fogg
Magdalena & Robert	29 (6,8,9,6)	Samba	"Tic Tic Tac" — Carrapicho
Kaja & Piotr	26 (5,7,8,6)	Tango	"Sombra" — Percy Faith

=== Week 4 ===
Running order

Couple	Score	Style	Music
Maria & Paweł	30 (6,8,9,7)	Paso Doble	"El Gato Montes" — Manuel Penella
Przemysław & Aneta	29 (7,8,8,6)	Foxtrot	"For Once in My Life" — Stevie Wonder
Przemysław & Ewa	35 (9,8,9,9)	Paso Doble	"Espana Boll" — Pascual Marquina Narro
Joanna & Robert	33 (7,9,9,8)	Foxtrot	"I Wanna Be Loved by You" — Marilyn Monroe
Kinga & Stefano	36 (9,9,9,9)	Paso Doble	"Malagueña" — Ernesto Lecuona
Magdalena & Robert	33 (7,9,9,8)	Foxtrot	"Smells Like Teen Spirit" — Nirvana
Peter & Dominika	28 (5,8,9,6)	Paso Doble	"Frozen" — Madonna
Marcin & Edyta	27 (5,8,8,6)	Foxtrot	"Kissing a Fool" — George Michael

=== Week 5: Jive Week ===
Running order

Couple	Score	Style	Music
Joanna & Robert	30 (7,8,8,7)	Jive	"Gettin' In The Mood" — The Brian Setzer Orchestra
Przemysław & Aneta	32 (7,9,9,7)	Jive	"Roll Over Beethoven" — Chuck Berry
Kinga & Stefano	32 (7,9,9,7)	Jive	"Long Tall Sally" — Little Richard
Maria & Paweł	30 (6,8,9,7)	Jive	"I'll Be There for You" — The Rembrandts
Marcin & Edyta	35 (8,9,9,9)	Jive	"Let's Twist Again" — Chubby Checker
Przemysław & Ewa	40 (10,10,10,10)	Jive	"If I Had a Hammer" — Peter, Paul and Mary
Peter & Dominika	36 (9,9,9,9)	Jive	"Hippy Hippy Shake" — Chan Romero

=== Week 6: Polish Week ===
Running order

Couple	Score	Style	Music
Marcin & Edyta	35 (8,9,9,9)	Rumba	"Pod papugami" — Czesław Niemen
Peter & Dominika	30 (6,8,9,7)	Quickstep	"Nie ma jak pompa" — Maryla Rodowicz
Joanna & Robert	35 (8,9,10,8)	Rumba	"Kochać inaczej" — De Mono
Przemysław & Ewa	40 (10,10,10,10)	Quickstep	"Nie stało się nic" — Wilki
Przemysław & Aneta	33 (8,8,9,8)	Paso Doble	"10 w skali Bouforta" — Krzysztof Klenczon
Kinga & Stefano	31 (5,9,10,7)	Foxtrot	"Chłopaki nie płaczą" — T.Love

=== Week 7: Elvis Presley Week ===
Running order

Couple	Score	Style	Music
Kinga & Stefano	33 (6,8,9,10)	Samba	"Viva Las Vegas" — Elvis Presley
Joanna & Robert	38 (9,10,10,9)	Waltz	"Are You Lonesome Tonight?" — Elvis Presley
Peter & Dominika	36 (8,9,10,9)	Cha-Cha-Cha	"Suspicious Minds" — Elvis Presley
Marcin & Edyta	32 (7,9,9,7)	Tango	"Surrender" — Elvis Presley
Przemysław & Ewa	38 (9,10,10,9)	Cha-Cha-Cha	"Moody Blue" — Elvis Presley
Przemysław & Ewa; Marcin & Edyta; Peter & Dominika; Joanna & Robert; Kinga & Stefano	N/A	Group Viennese Waltz	"Can't Help Falling in Love" — Elvis Presley

=== Week 8: Rock Week ===
Running order

Couple	Score	Style	Music
Peter & Dominika	32 (6,9,9,8)	Foxtrot	"Black Hole Sun" — Soundgarden
Peter & Dominika	38 (9,10,10,9)	Jive	"What You See Is What You Get" — Stoney & Meatloaf
Przemysław & Ewa	37 (9,9,10,9)	Foxtrot	"Jump" — Van Halen
Przemysław & Ewa	38 (9,10,10,9)	Rumba	"Kayleigh" — Marillion
Marcin & Edyta	34 (8,9,9,8)	Paso Doble	"Paradise City" — Guns N' Roses
Marcin & Edyta	36 (9,9,10,8)	Quickstep	"Just a Girl" — No Doubt
Kinga & Stefano	38 (9,10,10,9)	Quickstep	"Desire" — U2
Kinga & Stefano	40 (10,10,10,10)	Rumba	"A Whiter Shade of Pale" — Procol Harum

=== Week 9: Classical Music Week ===
Running order

Couple	Score	Style	Music
Peter & Dominika	33 (7,9,9,8)	Samba	"Turkish March" — Wolfgang Amadeus Mozart
Peter & Dominika	39 (9,10,10,10)	Tango	"The Barber of Seville" — Gioacchino Rossini
Kinga & Stefano	37 (8,10,10,9)	Cha-Cha-Cha	"Symphony No. 5" — Ludwig van Beethoven
Kinga & Stefano	37 (8,9,10,10)	Tango	"'O Sole Mio" — Eduardo di Capua
Marcin & Edyta	38 (9,9,10,10)	Waltz	"Für Elise" — Ludwig van Beethoven
Marcin & Edyta	33 (7,9,10,7)	Samba	"Symphony in G minor" — Wolfgang Amadeus Mozart

=== Week 10: Final ===
Running order

Couple	Score	Style	Music
Kinga & Stefano	38 (9,10,10,9)	Paso Doble	"Malagueña" — Ernesto Lecuona
Kinga & Stefano	35 (8,9,10,8)	Quickstep	"Desire" — U2
Kinga & Stefano	40 (10,10,10,10)	Freestyle	"Ain't No Sunshine" — Bill Withers
Peter & Dominika	38 (9,10,10,9)	Jive	"Hippy Hippy Shake" — Chan Romero
Peter & Dominika	37 (9,10,9,9)	Waltz	"Speak Softly Love" — Andy Williams
Peter & Dominika	38 (10,10,9,9)	Freestyle	"Casi un Bolero"/"La Bomba"/"La Copa de la Vida" — Ricky Martin

Other Dances

Couple	Style	Music
Marcin & Edyta	Jive	"Let's Twist Again" — Chubby Checker
Przemysław & Ewa	Jive	"If I Had a Hammer" — Peter, Paul and Mary
Joanna & Robert	Samba	"Conga" — Gloria Estefan
Przemysław & Aneta	Cha-Cha-Cha	"Celebration" — Kool & the Gang
Maria & Paweł	Waltz	"Nie opuszczaj mnie" — Irena Jarocka
Magdalena & Robert	Foxtrot	"Smells Like Teen Spirit" — Nirvana
Kaja & Piotr	Rumba	"The Most Beautiful Girl in the World" — Prince
Michał & Izabela	Quickstep	"Sparkling Diamonds"—Marilyn Monroe
Joanna & Robert; Kinga & Stefano; Magdalena & Robert; Kaja & Piotr; Maria & Paweł; Marcin & Edyta; Peter & Dominika; Michał & Izabela; Przemysław & Aneta; Przemysław & Ewa	Group Viennese Waltz	"House of the Rising Sun" — The Animals

== Dance schedule ==
The celebrities and professional partners danced one of these routines for each corresponding week.

- Week 1: Cha-Cha-Cha or Waltz
- Week 2: Rumba or Quickstep
- Week 3: Samba or Tango
- Week 4: Paso Doble or Foxtrot
- Week 5: Jive
- Week 6: One unlearned dance (Polish Week)
- Week 7: One unlearned dance & Group Viennese Waltz (Elvis Presley Week)
- Week 8: One unlearned dance & one repeated dance (Rock Music Week)
- Week 9: One unlearned dance & one repeated dance (Classic Music Week)
- Week 10: Favorite Latin dance, favorite Ballroom dance & Freestyle

Team	Week 1	Week 2	Week 3	Week 4	Week 5	Week 6	Week 7		Week 8		Week 9		Week 10 Final		
Kinga & Stefano	Waltz	Rumba	Tango	Paso Doble	Jive	Foxtrot	Samba	Group Viennese Waltz	Quickstep	Rumba	Cha-Cha-Cha	Tango	Paso Doble	Quickstep	Freestyle
Peter & Dominika	Waltz	Rumba	Tango	Paso Doble	Jive	Quickstep	Cha-Cha-Cha	Group Viennese Waltz	Foxtrot	Jive	Samba	Tango	Jive	Waltz	Freestyle
Marcin & Edyta	Cha-Cha-Cha	Quickstep	Samba	Foxtrot	Jive	Rumba	Tango	Group Viennese Waltz	Paso Doble	Quickstep	Waltz	Samba			Jive
Przemysław & Ewa	Waltz	Rumba	Tango	Paso Doble	Jive	Quickstep	Cha-Cha-Cha	Group Viennese Waltz	Foxtrot	Rumba					Jive
Joanna & Robert	Cha-Cha-Cha	Quickstep	Samba	Foxtrot	Jive	Rumba	Waltz	Group Viennese Waltz							Samba
Przemysław & Aneta	Cha-Cha-Cha	Quickstep	Samba	Foxtrot	Jive	Paso Doble									Cha-Cha-Cha
Maria & Paweł	Waltz	Rumba	Tango	Paso Doble	Jive										Waltz
Magdalena & Robert	Cha-Cha-Cha	Quickstep	Samba	Foxtrot											Foxtrot
Kaja & Piotr	Waltz	Rumba	Tango												Rumba
Michał & Izabela	Cha-Cha-Cha	Quickstep													Quickstep

Highest scoring dance
Lowest scoring dance
Performed, but not scored

== Episode results ==
Order	Week 2	Week 3	Week 4	Week 5	Week 6	Week 7	Week 8	Week 9	Week 10 Final
1	Przemysław & Aneta	Joanna & Robert	Kinga & Stefano	Przemysław & Ewa	Przemysław & Ewa	Przemysław & Ewa	Kinga & Stefano	Kinga & Stefano	Kinga & Stefano
2	Kinga & Stefano	Peter & Dominika	Joanna & Robert	Marcin & Edyta	Kinga & Stefano	Marcin & Edyta	Peter & Dominika	Peter & Dominika	Peter & Dominika
3	Peter & Dominika	Kinga & Stefano	Przemysław & Aneta	Przemysław & Aneta	Joanna & Robert	Kinga & Stefano	Marcin & Edyta	Marcin & Edyta	
4	Marcin & Edyta	Przemysław & Aneta	Przemysław & Ewa	Kinga & Stefano	Peter & Dominika	Peter & Dominika	Przemysław & Ewa		
5	Joanna & Robert	Maria & Paweł	Marcin & Edyta	Peter & Dominika	Marcin & Edyta	Joanna & Robert			
6	Maria & Paweł	Marcin & Edyta	Peter & Dominika	Joanna & Robert	Przemysław & Aneta				
7	Przemysław & Ewa	Przemysław & Ewa	Maria & Paweł	Maria & Paweł					
8	Kaja & Piotr	Magdalena & Robert	Magdalena & Robert						
9	Magdalena & Robert	Kaja & Piotr							
10	Michał & Izabela								

This couple came in first place with the judges.
This couple came in first place with the judges and gained the highest number of viewers' votes.
This couple gained the highest number of viewers' votes.
This couple came in first place with the judges and was eliminated.
This couple came in last place with the judges and gained the highest number of viewers' votes.
This couple came in last place with the judges.
This couple came in last place with the judges and was eliminated.
This couple was eliminated.
This couple won the competition.
This couple came in second in the competition.
This couple came in third in the competition.

== Audience voting results ==
Order	Week 2	Week 3	Week 4	Week 5	Week 6	Week 7	Week 8	Week 9	Week 10 Final
1	Kinga & Stefano	Kinga & Stefano	Kinga & Stefano	Marcin & Edyta	Kinga & Stefano	Marcin & Edyta	Kinga & Stefano	Kinga & Stefano	Kinga & Stefano (63%)
2	Przemysław & Aneta	Joanna & Robert	Marcin & Edyta	Przemysław & Ewa	Peter & Dominika	Kinga & Stefano	Peter & Dominika	Peter & Dominika	Peter & Dominika (37%)
3	Maria & Paweł	Przemysław & Aneta	Przemysław & Aneta	Przemysław & Aneta	Przemysław & Ewa	Peter & Dominika	Marcin & Edyta	Marcin & Edyta	
4	Marcin & Edyta	Marcin & Edyta	Peter & Dominika	Kinga & Stefano	Joanna & Robert	Przemysław & Ewa	Przemysław & Ewa		
5	Joanna & Robert	Peter & Dominika	Joanna & Robert	Joanna & Robert	Przemysław & Aneta	Joanna & Robert			
6	Peter & Dominika	Maria & Paweł	Maria & Paweł	Peter & Dominika	Marcin & Edyta				
7	Przemysław & Ewa	Kaja & Piotr	Przemysłąw & Ewa	Maria & Paweł					
8	Kaja & Piotr	Przemysłąw & Ewa	Magdalena & Robert	'					
9	Michał & Izabela	Magdalena & Robert							
10	Magdalena & Robert								

== Guest performances ==
Date	Artist(s)	Song
15 October 2006	Piotr Cugowski	"Nie proszę o więcej"
5 November 2006	Natalia Kukulska	"A Natural Woman"

== Rating figures ==
Episode	Date	Official rating 4+	Share 4+	Share 16-39
1	10 September 2006	5 985 982	38,94%	35,84%
2	17 September 2006	6 035 684	39,58%	34,89%
3	24 September 2006	6 175 603	38,93%	35,15%
4	1 October 2006	6 175 212	37,33%	33,93%
5	8 October 2006	6 503 560	39,33%	37,45%
6	15 October 2006	6 499 586	38,49%	36,34%
7	22 October 2006	6 371 524	38,68%	34,53%
8	29 October 2006	6 593 505	37,33%	33,38%
9	5 November 2006	6 764 410	39,03%	33,30%
10	12 November 2006	6 917 683	39,55%	35,96%
Average	-	6 389 535	38,72%	35,06%
