= Taniec z gwiazdami season 5 =

Taniec z gwiazdami
- Season 5
- Hosted by: Hubert Urbański; Katarzyna Skrzynecka
- Judges: Iwona Pavlović; Piotr Galiński; Beata Tyszkiewicz; Zbigniew Wodecki
- Celebrity winner: Krzysztof Tyniec
- Professional winner: Kamila Kajak
- No. of episodes: 10

Release
- Original network: TVN
- Original release: 4 March – 6 May 2007

Season chronology
- ← Previous; Season 4 Next → Season 6

The 5th season of Taniec z Gwiazdami, the Polish edition of Dancing With the Stars, started on 4 March 2007 and ended on 6 May 2007. It was broadcast by TVN. Katarzyna Skrzynecka and Hubert Urbański continued as the hosts, and the judges were: Iwona Szymańska-Pavlović, Zbigniew Wodecki, Beata Tyszkiewicz and Piotr Galiński.

Krzysztof Tyniec and his partner Kamila Kajak were crowned the champions.

== Couples ==
Celebrity	Occupation	Professional partner	Status
Wojciech Majchrzak	Film and television actor	Magdalena Soszyńska	Eliminated 1st on 11 March 2007
Anna Samusionek	Film and television actress	Łukasz Czarnecki	Eliminated 2nd on 18 March 2007
Rafał Olbrychski	Actor and singer	Ewa Szabatin	Eliminated 3rd on 25 March 2007
Ewa Wachowicz	Miss World 1992 finalist and television presenter	Marek Fiksa	Eliminated 4th on 1 April 2007
Omenaa Mensah	TVN weather presenter	Rafał Maserak	Eliminated 5th on 7 April 2007
Bartosz Obuchowicz	Na dobre i na złe actor	Kinga Jurecka	Eliminated 6th on 15 April 2007
Kasia Cerekwicka	Singer	Żora Korolyov	Eliminated 7th on 22 April 2007
Katarzyna Tusk	Donald Tusk's daughter	Stefano Terrazzino; Robert Rowiński (Week 5)	Third Place on 29 April 2007
Ivan Komarenko	Ivan and Delfin singer	Blanka Winiarska	Runners-up on 6 May 2007
Krzysztof Tyniec	Film and television actor	Kamila Kajak	Winners on 6 May 2007

== Scores ==
Couple	Place	1	2	1+2	3	4	5	6	7	8	9	10
Krzysztof & Kamila	1	34†	33†	67†	36†	37	31	40†	33	38+40=78†	38+40=78†	40+40+40=120†
Ivan & Blanka	2	29	32	61	28	29	31	29	33	30+34=64	37+37=74	38+40+40=118‡
Katarzyna & Stefano	3	28	24‡	52	26	23‡	33	26‡	29‡	28+29=57‡	26+32=58‡	
Kasia & Żora	4	27	30	57	30	36	35†	35	36†	33+29=62		
Bartosz & Kinga	5	34†	33†	67†	36†	34	34	34	30			
Omenaa & Rafał	6	31	30	61	24‡	24	26‡	29				
Ewa & Marek	7	31	27	58	30	38†	28					
Rafał & Ewa	8	25‡	24‡	49‡	24‡	23‡						
Anna & Łukasz	9	30	25	55	27							
Wojciech & Magdalena	10	26	25	51								

Red numbers indicate the lowest score for each week.
Green numbers indicate the highest score for each week.
indicates the couple eliminated that week.
indicates the returning couple that finished in the bottom two.
indicates the winning couple of the week.
indicates the runner-up of the week.

Notes:

Week 1: Krzysztof Tyniec and Bartosz Obuchowicz scored 34 out of 40 on their first dance, making it the highest score in this episode. Rafał Olbrychski got 25 points for his Waltz, making it the lowest score of the week. There was no elimination this week.

Week 2: Krzysztof Tyniec and Bartosz Obuchowicz scored 33 out of 40 on their second dance, making it the highest score in this episode. Rafał Olbrychski got 24 points for his Rumba, making it the lowest score of the week. Wojciech & Magdalena were eliminated despite being 1 points from the bottom.

Week 3: Krzysztof Tyniec and Bartosz Obuchowicz scored 36 out of 40 on their third dance, making it the highest score in this episode. It was the highest score ever in Week 3. Klaudia Carlos, Małgorzata Foremniak, Katarzyna Cichopek, Joanna Liszowska and Peter J. Lucas also got 36 points for their 3rd dance in Week 3. Rafał Olbrychski and Omenaa Mensah got 24 points, making it the lowest score of the week. Anna & Łukasz were eliminated despite being 3 points from the bottom.

Week 4: Ewa Wachowicz scored 38 out of 40 on her 4th dance (Paso Doble), making it the highest score in this episode. Rafał Olbrychski and Katarzyna Tusk got 23 points for their Paso Doble, making it the lowest score of the week and this season. Rafał & Ewa were on the bottom of the leaderboard for the fourth consecutive week. Rafał & Ewa were eliminated.

Week 5: Kasia Cerekwicka scored 35 out of 40 on her 5th dance, making it the highest score in this episode. Omenaa Mensah got 26 points for her Samba, making it the lowest score of the week. Ewa & Marek were eliminated despite being 2 points from the bottom.

Week 6: All couples danced to the most famous songs of Frank Sinatra. Krzysztof Tyniec received the first perfect score of the season for his Foxtrot. Katarzyna Tusk got 26 points for her Foxtrot, making it the lowest score of the week. Omenaa & Rafał were eliminated despite being 3 points from the bottom.

Week 7: All couples danced to the most famous songs of Kabaret Starszych Panów. Kasia Cerekwicka scored 36 out of 40 on her 7th dance, making it the highest score in this episode. Katarzyna Tusk got 29 points for her Cha-cha-cha, making it the lowest score of the week. Bartosz & Kinga were eliminated despite being 1 points from the bottom.

Week 8: All couples danced to the most famous songs of Madonna. Krzysztof Tyniec received his second perfect score for the Paso Doble. Katarzyna Tusk got 28 points for her Quickstep and 29 points for her Samba, making it the lowest score of the week. Kasia & Żora were eliminated despite being 5 points from the bottom.

Week 9: All couples danced to the most famous Italian songs. Krzysztof Tyniec received his third perfect score for the Waltz. Katarzyna Tusk got 26 points for her Jive and 32 points for her Tango, making it the lowest score of the week. Katarzyna & Stefano were on the bottom of the leaderboard for the fourth consecutive week. Katarzyna & Stefano were eliminated.

Week 10: Krzysztof Tyniec received his 4th, 5th and 6th perfect score for the Tango, Paso Doble and Freestyle. Krzysztof Tyniec got 120 out of 120 points, making it the first person getting the highest possible score in the finale. Ivan Komarenko received his first perfect score for the Tango and second for his Freestyle. Both couples had to perform three dances: their favorite Latin dance, their favorite Ballroom dance and a Freestyle. Krzysztof Tyniec became the 5th winner in the history of the show. This is the 4th time the season's winner was on the first place on the judges' general scoreboard.

== Average chart ==
Rank by average	Place	Team	Average	Total	Best Score	Worst Score
1.	1.	Krzysztof Tyniec & Kamila Kajak	37	520	40	31
2.	5.	Bartosz Obuchowicz & Kinga Jurecka	34	235	36	30
3.	2.	Ivan Komarenko & Blanka Winiarska	33	467	40	28
4.	4.	Kasia Cerekwicka & Żora Korolyov	32	291	36	27
5.	7.	Ewa Wachowicz & Marek Fiksa	31	154	38	27
6.	3.	Katarzyna Tusk & Stefano Terrazzino	28	304	33	23
7.	6.	Omenaa Mensah & Rafał Maserak	27	164	31	24
8.	9.	Anna Samusionek & Łukasz Czarnecki	27	82	30	25
9.	10.	Wojciech Majchrzak & Magdalena Soszyńska-Michno	26	51	26	25
10.	8.	Rafał Olbrychski & Ewa Szabatin	24	96	25	23
Everyteam			30	2364		

== Average dance chart ==
Couples	Averages	Best Dances	Worst Dances
Krzysztof & Kamila	37.1	Foxtrot, Paso Doble (twice), Waltz, Tango, Freestyle (40)	Samba (31)
Bartosz & Kinga	33.6	Jive (36)	Tango (30)
Ivan & Blanka	33.4	Tango, Freestyle (40)	Jive (28)
Kasia & Żora	32.3	Foxtrot, Tango (36)	Cha-Cha-Cha (27)
Ewa & Marek	30.8	Paso Doble (38)	Rumba (27)
Katarzyna & Stefano	27.6	Samba (33)	Paso Doble (23)
Omenaa & Rafał	27.3	Cha-Cha-Cha (31)	Jive, Foxtrot (24)
Anna & Łukasz	27.3	Cha-Cha-Cha (30)	Quickstep (25)
Wojciech & Magdalena	25.5	Waltz (26)	Rumba (25)
Rafał & Ewa	24.0	Waltz (25)	Paso Doble (23)

== Highest and lowest scoring performances ==
The best and worst performances in each dance according to the judges' marks are as follows:

Dance	Best dancer	Best score	Worst dancer	Worst score
Cha-Cha-Cha	Krzysztof Tyniec	38	Kasia Cerekwicka	27
Waltz	Krzysztof Tyniec	40	Rafał Olbrychski	25
Quickstep	Krzysztof Tyniec	38	Anna Samusionek	25
Rumba	Kasia Cerekwicka	35	Rafał Olbrychski; Katarzyna Tusk	24
Jive	Bartosz Obuchowicz	36	Omenaa Mensah	24
Tango	Krzysztof Tyniec; Ivan Komarenko	40	Rafał Olbrychski	24
Foxtrot	Krzysztof Tyniec	40	Omenaa Mensah	24
Paso Doble	Krzysztof Tyniec	40	Rafał Olbrychski; Katarzyna Tusk	23
Samba	Ivan Komarenko	38	Omenaa Mensah	26
Freestyle	Krzysztof Tyniec; Ivan Komarenko	40		

== Episodes ==
=== Week 1 ===
Individual judges scores in charts below (given in parentheses) are listed in this order from left to right: Piotr Galiński, Beata Tyszkiewicz, Zbigniew Wodecki, Iwona Pavlović.

Running order

Couple	Score	Style	Music
Kasia & Żora	27 (6,8,7,6)	Cha-Cha-Cha	"Oh, Pretty Woman" — Roy Orbison
Wojciech & Magdalena	26 (5,8,7,6)	Waltz	"If You Don't Know Me By Now" — Simply Red
Ivan & Blanka	29 (6,8,8,7)	Cha-Cha-Cha	"Say, Say, Say" — Michael Jackson & Paul McCartney
Ewa & Marek	31 (7,8,8,8)	Waltz	"Nature Boy" — Nat King Cole
Bartosz & Kinga	34 (8,9,9,8)	Cha-Cha-Cha	"Billie Jean" — Michael Jackson
Katarzyna & Stefano	28 (6,8,8,6)	Waltz	"Smile" — Nat King Cole
Omenaa & Rafał	31 (8,9,8,6)	Cha-Cha-Cha	"Corazon Espinado" — Carlos Santana
Krzysztof & Kamila	34 (8,9,9,8)	Waltz	"Weekend in New England" — Barry Manilow
Anna & Łukasz	30 (7,8,8,7)	Cha-Cha-Cha	"Every Breath You Take" — The Police
Rafał & Ewa	25 (5,8,7,5)	Waltz	"Georgia on My Mind" — Ray Charles

=== Week 2 ===
Running order

Couple	Score	Style	Music
Ewa & Marek	27 (5,8,8,6)	Rumba	"Jesus to a Child" — George Michael
Ivan & Blanka	32 (7,9,9,7)	Quickstep	"Mr. Sandman" — The Chordettes
Katarzyna & Stefano	24 (5,8,7,4)	Rumba	"First Day of My Life" — Melanie C
Bartosz & Kinga	33 (8,9,9,7)	Quickstep	"Courtin' Time" — Prince
Krzysztof & Kamila	33 (8,9,8,8)	Rumba	"Love Is All Around" — The Troggs
Omenaa & Rafał	30 (7,9,8,6)	Quickstep	"Lemon Tree" — Fool's Garden
Rafał & Ewa	24 (4,7,9,4)	Rumba	"Imagine" — John Lennon
Anna & Łukasz	25 (5,8,7,5)	Quickstep	"Sing, Sing, Sing" — The Andrews Sisters
Wojciech & Magdalena	25 (5,8,7,5)	Rumba	"Sacrifice" — Elton John
Kasia & Żora	30 (7,8,8,7)	Quickstep	"Fly Me to the Moon" — Frank Sinatra

=== Week 3 ===
Running order

Couple	Score	Style	Music
Anna & Łukasz	27 (6,8,7,6)	Jive	"Isn't She Lovely" — Stevie Wonder
Katarzyna & Stefano	26 (5,9,8,4)	Tango	"Moonlight Shadow" — Mike Oldfield & Maggie Reilly
Kasia & Żora	30 (7,8,8,7)	Jive	"Walk of Life" — Dire Straits
Krzysztof & Kamila	36 (9,9,9,9)	Tango	"In-tango" — In-Grid
Bartosz & Kinga	36 (9,9,9,9)	Jive	"The River of Dreams" — Billy Joel
Rafał & Ewa	24 (5,9,7,3)	Tango	"Twist in My Sobriety" — Tanita Tikaram
Ivan & Blanka	28 (6,8,8,6)	Jive	"Maneater" — Hall & Oates
Ewa & Marek	30 (7,8,8,7)	Tango	"Tango Diabolo" — Christa Behnke
Omenaa & Rafał	24 (4,8,7,5)	Jive	"Jambalaya (On the Bayou)" — Hank Williams

=== Week 4 ===
Running order

Couple	Score	Style	Music
Rafał & Ewa	23 (5,9,7,2)	Paso Doble	"El Conquistador" – Jose Esparza
Ivan & Blanka	29 (6,9,8,6)	Foxtrot	"These Foolish Things (Remind Me of You)" – Rod Stewart
Katarzyna & Stefano	23 (5,8,7,3)	Paso Doble	"Money for Nothing" – Dire Straits
Omenaa & Rafał	24 (3,8,8,5)	Foxtrot	"Autumn Leaves" – Vladimir Cosma
Krzysztof & Kamila	37 (9,9,9,10)	Paso Doble	"It's My Life" – Bon Jovi
Bartosz & Kinga	34 (8,9,9,8)	Foxtrot	"A Foggy Day" – Fred Astaire
Ewa & Marek	38 (10,9,10,9)	Paso Doble	"Da Ya Think I'm Sexy?" – Rod Stewart
Kasia & Żora	36 (9,9,9,9)	Foxtrot	"Don't Get Around Much Anymore" – Louis Armstrong

=== Week 5 ===
Running order

Couple	Score	Style	Music
Ivan & Blanka	31 (7,8,9,7)	Samba	"Whenever, Wherever" – Shakira
Kasia & Żora	35 (8,9,9,9)	Samba	"La Copa de la Vida" – Ricky Martin
Bartosz & Kinga	34 (8,9,9,8)	Samba	"Bailando" – Paradisio
Omenaa & Rafał	26 (6,8,8,4)	Samba	"María" – Ricky Martin
Katarzyna & Robert*	33 (8,9,9,7)	Samba	"Lady (Hear Me Tonight)" – Modjo
Krzysztof & Kamila	31 (8,8,9,6)	Samba	"Livin' la Vida Loca" – Ricky Martin
Ewa & Marek	28 (7,8,8,5)	Samba	"Baila Me" – Gipsy Kings

- Robert Rowiński partnered with Katarzyna Tusk because of Stefano's injury.

=== Week 6: Frank Sinatra Week ===
Running order

Couple	Score	Style	Music
Katarzyna & Stefano	26 (5,8,8,5)	Foxtrot	"Love and Marriage" – Frank Sinatra
Bartosz & Kinga	34 (8,9,9,8)	Rumba	"Killing Me Softly" – Frank Sinatra
Omenaa & Rafał	29 (7,8,8,6)	Tango	"They Can't Take That Away from Me" – Frank Sinatra
Kasia & Żora	35 (8,10,8,9)	Rumba	"Strangers in the Night" – Frank Sinatra
Krzysztof & Kamila	40 (10,10,10,10)	Foxtrot	"Singin' in the Rain" – Gene Kelly
Ivan & Blanka	29 (6,8,8,7)	Rumba	"My Way" – Frank Sinatra

=== Week 7: Kabaret Starszych Panów Week ===
Running order

Couple	Score	Style	Music
Bartosz & Kinga	30 (7,8,9,6)	Tango	"Tango Kat" – Jeremi Przybora & Jerzy Wasowski
Katarzyna & Stefano	29 (7,9,8,5)	Cha-Cha-Cha	"Na ryby" – Jeremi Przybora & Jerzy Wasowski
Ivan & Blanka	33 (8,9,9,7)	Waltz	"Dobranoc" – Jeremi Przybora & Jerzy Wasowski
Krzysztof & Kamila	33 (8,8,9,8)	Jive	"Bo we mnie jest seks" – Jeremi Przybora & Jerzy Wasowski
Kasia & Żora	36 (9,9,9,9)	Tango	"Już kąpiesz się nie dla mnie" – Jeremi Przybora & Jerzy Wasowski
Bartosz & Kinga; Katarzyna & Stefano; Ivan & Blanka; Krzysztof & Kamila; Kasia & Żora	N/A	Group Viennese Waltz	"Rodzina" – Jeremi Przybora & Jerzy Wasowski

=== Week 8: Madonna Week ===
Running order

Couple	Score	Style	Music
Kasia & Żora	33 (8,9,8,8)	Paso Doble	"Like a Prayer" – Madonna
Kasia & Żora	29 (7,8,7,7)	Foxtrot	"Cherish" – Madonna
Krzysztof & Kamila	38 (9,10,10,9)	Quickstep	"American Pie" – Madonna
Krzysztof & Kamila	40 (10,10,10,10)	Paso Doble	"Frozen" – Madonna
Ivan & Blanka	30 (6,8,9,7)	Paso Doble	"Like a Virgin" – Madonna
Ivan & Blanka	34 (8,9,9,8)	Foxtrot	"Material Girl" – Madonna
Katarzyna & Stefano	28 (6,9,8,5)	Quickstep	"Hanky Panky" – Madonna
Katarzyna & Stefano	29 (6,9,8,6)	Samba	"La Isla Bonita" – Madonna

=== Week 9: Italian Week ===
Running order

Couple	Score	Style	Music
Ivan & Blanka	37 (9,10,9,9)	Tango	"Arrivederci Roma" – Renato Rascel & Pietro Garinei
Ivan & Blanka	37 (9,10,10,8)	Cha-Cha-Cha	"Fuoco nel fuoco" – Eros Ramazzotti
Krzysztof & Kamila	38 (10,10,10,8)	Cha-Cha-Cha	"Baila morena" – Zucchero
Krzysztof & Kamila	40 (10,10,10,10)	Waltz	"Non ho l'eta" – Gigliola Cinquetti
Katarzyna & Stefano	26 (5,8,8,5)	Jive	"L'Italiano" – Toto Cutugno
Katarzyna & Stefano	32 (7,10,9,6)	Tango	"Azzurro" – Paolo Conte & Vito Pallavicini

=== Week 10: Final ===
Running order

Couple	Score	Style	Music
Krzysztof & Kamila	40 (10,10,10,10)	Paso Doble	"It's My Life" – Bon Jovi
Krzysztof & Kamila	40 (10,10,10,10)	Tango	"In-tango" – In-Grid
Krzysztof & Kamila	40 (10,10,10,10)	Freestyle	"Feeling Good" – Leslie Bricusse & Anthony Newley "Quando Quando Quando" – Tony Renis & Alberto Testa
Ivan & Blanka	38 (9,10,10,9)	Samba	"Whenever, Wherever" – Shakira
Ivan & Blanka	40 (10,10,10,10)	Tango	"Arrivederci Roma" – Renato Rascel & Pietro Garinei
Ivan & Blanka	40 (10,10,10,10)	Freestyle	"Cancion del Mariachi" – Cesar Rosas "Jej czarne oczy" – Ivan Komarenko

Other Dances

Couple	Style	Music
Krzysztof & Kamila; Ivan & Blanka; Katarzyna & Stefano; Katarzyna & Żora; Bartosz & Kinga; Omenaa & Rafał; Rafał & Ewa; Ewa & Marek; Wojciech & Magdalena; Anna & Łukasz	Group Viennese Waltz	"Będziesz moją panią" – Marek Grechuta
Wojciech & Magdalena	Rumba	"Sacrifice" — Elton John
Anna & Łukasz	Cha-Cha-Cha	"Every Breath You Take" — The Police
Rafał & Ewa	Tango	"Twist in My Sobriety" — Tanita Tikaram
Ewa & Marek	Paso Doble	"Da Ya Think I'm Sexy?" — Rod Stewart
Omenaa & Rafał	Samba	"Maria" – Ricky Martin
Bartosz & Kinga	Jive	"The River of Dreams" — Billy Joel
Kasia & Żora	Samba	"La Copa De La Vida" — Ricky Martin
Katarzyna & Stefano	Samba	"Lady (Hear Me Tonight)" — Modjo
Kinga Rusin & Stefano Terrazzino (4th Season Winner)	Paso Doble	"Malaguena" — Ernesto Lecuona

== Dance schedule ==
The celebrities and professional partners danced one of these routines for each corresponding week.

- Week 1: Cha-Cha-Cha or Waltz
- Week 2: Rumba or Quickstep
- Week 3: Jive or Tango
- Week 4: Paso Doble or Foxtrot
- Week 5: Samba
- Week 6: One unlearned dance (Frank Sinatra Week)
- Week 7: One unlearned dance & Group Viennese Waltz (Kabaret Starszych Panów Week)
- Week 8: One unlearned dance & one repeated dance (Madonna Week)
- Week 9: One unlearned dance & one repeated dance (Italian Week)
- Week 10: Favorite Latin dance, favorite Ballroom dance & Freestyle

Couple	Week 1	Week 2	Week 3	Week 4	Week 5	Week 6	Week 7		Week 8		Week 9		Week 10 Final		
Krzysztof & Kamila	Waltz	Rumba	Tango	Paso Doble	Samba	Foxtrot	Jive	Group Viennese Waltz	Quickstep	Paso Doble	Cha-Cha-Cha	Waltz	Paso Doble	Tango	Freestyle
Ivan & Blanka	Cha-Cha-Cha	Quickstep	Jive	Foxtrot	Samba	Rumba	Waltz	Group Viennese Waltz	Paso Doble	Foxtrot	Tango	Cha-Cha-Cha	Samba	Tango	Freestyle
Katarzyna & Stefano	Waltz	Rumba	Tango	Paso Doble	Samba	Foxtrot	Cha-Cha-Cha	Group Viennese Waltz	Quickstep	Samba	Jive	Tango			Samba
Kasia & Żora	Cha-Cha-Cha	Quickstep	Jive	Foxtrot	Samba	Rumba	Tango	Group Viennese Waltz	Paso Doble	Foxtrot					Samba
Bartosz & Kinga	Cha-Cha-Cha	Quickstep	Jive	Foxtrot	Samba	Rumba	Tango	Group Viennese Waltz							Jive
Omenaa & Rafał	Cha-Cha-Cha	Quickstep	Jive	Foxtrot	Samba	Tango									Samba
Ewa & Marek	Waltz	Rumba	Tango	Paso Doble	Samba										Paso Doble
Rafał & Ewa	Waltz	Rumba	Tango	Paso Doble											Tango
Anna & Łukasz	Cha-Cha-Cha	Quickstep	Jive												Cha-Cha-Cha
Wojciech & Magdalena	Waltz	Rumba													Rumba

Highest scoring dance
Lowest scoring dance
Performed, but not scored

== Episode results ==
Order	Week 2	Week 3	Week 4	Week 5	Week 6	Week 7	Week 8	Week 9	Week 10 Final
1	Bartosz & Kinga	Bartosz & Kinga	Krzysztof & Kamila	Katarzyna & Stefano	Krzysztof & Kamila	Krzysztof & Kamila	Krzysztof & Kamila	Ivan & Blanka	Krzysztof & Kamila
2	Ivan & Blanka	Krzysztof & Kamila	Ewa & Marek	Krzysztof & Kamila	Kasia & Żora	Kasia & Żora	Katarzyna & Stefano	Krzysztof & Kamila	Ivan & Blanka
3	Krzysztof & Kamila	Katarzyna & Stefano	Katarzyna & Stefano	Ivan & Blanka	Katarzyna & Stefano	Katarzyna & Stefano	Ivan & Blanka	Katarzyna & Stefano	
4	Omenaa & Rafał	Ewa & Marek	Ivan & Blanka	Bartosz & Kinga	Ivan & Blanka	Ivan & Blanka	Kasia & Żora		
5	Katarzyna & Stefano	Ivan & Blanka	Bartosz & Kinga	Kasia & Żora	Bartosz & Kinga	Bartosz & Kinga			
6	Kasia & Żora	Omenaa & Rafał	Kasia & Żora	Omenaa & Rafał	Omenaa & Rafał				
7	Rafał & Ewa	Kasia & Żora	Omenaa & Rafał	Ewa & Marek					
8	Anna & Łukasz	Rafał & Ewa	Rafał & Ewa						
9	Ewa & Marek	Anna & Łukasz							
10	Wojciech & Magdalena								

This couple came in first place with the judges.
This couple came in first place with the judges and gained the highest number of viewers' votes.
This couple gained the highest number of viewers' votes.
This couple came in last place with the judges and gained the highest number of viewers' votes.
This couple came in last place with the judges.
This couple came in last place with the judges and was eliminated.
This couple was eliminated.
This couple won the competition.
This couple came in second in the competition.
This couple came in third in the competition.

== Audience voting results ==
Order	Week 2	Week 3	Week 4	Week 5	Week 6	Week 7	Week 8	Week 9	Week 10 Final
1	Katarzyna & Stefano	Katarzyna & Stefano	Katarzyna & Stefano	Katarzyna & Stefano	Katarzyna & Stefano	Katarzyna & Stefano	Katarzyna & Stefano	Ivan & Blanka	Krzysztof & Kamila
2	Ivan & Blanka	Bartosz & Kinga	Krzysztof & Kamila	Krzysztof & Kamila	Krzysztof & Kamila	Krzysztof & Kamila	Krzysztof & Kamila	Krzysztof & Kamila	Ivan & Blanka
3	Bartosz & Kinga	Omenaa & Rafał	Ivan & Blanka	Omenaa & Rafał	Ivan & Blanka	Kasia & Żora	Ivan & Blanka	Katarzyna & Stefano	
4	Rafał & Ewa	Krzysztof & Kamila	Bartosz & Kinga	Ivan & Blanka	Kasia & Żora	Ivan & Blanka	Kasia & Żora		
5	Omenaa & Rafał	Ivan & Blanka	Ewa & Marek	Ewa & Marek	Bartosz & Kinga	Bartosz & Kinga			
6	Krzysztof & Kamila	Ewa & Marek	Omenaa & Rafał	Bartosz & Kinga	Omenaa & Rafał				
7	Kasia & Żora	Rafał & Ewa	Kasia & Żora	Kasia & Żora					
8	Anna & Łukasz	Kasia & Żora	Rafał & Ewa						
9	Ewa & Marek	Anna & Łukasz							
10	Wojciech & Magdalena								

== Guest performances ==
Episode	Date	Singer/Star	Song	Dancers
5	1 April 2007	Tomasz Szymuś's Orchestra	"Let's Get Loud"	Group VOLT
5	1 April 2007	Jarosław Weber	"Let's Dance"	Group VOLT
6	8 April 2007	Jarosław Weber	Theme from New York, New York
6	8 April 2007	Zbigniew Wodecki	"Somewhere Over the Rainbow"
7	15 April 2007	Ewelina Flinta	"Kaziu, zakochaj się"
7	15 April 2007	Tomasz Szymuś's Orchestra	"Piosenka jest dobra na wszystko"	Group VOLT
8	22 April 2007	Tatiana Okupnik	"Don't Hold Back"
8	22 April 2007	Tomasz Szymuś's Orchestra	"Hung Up"	Group VOLT
9	29 April 2007	Kasia Cerekwicka	"Dov'e l'amore"
9	29 April 2007	Tomasz Szymuś's Orchestra	"Felicita"	Group VOLT
10	6 May 2007	Maciej Miecznikowski	"I Could Have Danced All Night"	Group VOLT

== Rating figures ==
Episode	Date	Official rating 4+	Share 4+	Share 16–39
1	4 March 2007	5 028 912	27,60%	26,01%
2	11 March 2007	5 417 743	30,10%	28,89%
3	18 March 2007	5 164 393	27,82%	26,11%
4	25 March 2007	5 119 496	27,81%	27,18%
5	1 April 2007	4 753 618	26,93%	24,07%
6	8 April 2007	4 332 760	26,94%	23,30%
7	15 April 2007	4 509 445	26,79%	25,47%
8	22 April 2007	4 606 325	27,03%	26,57%
9	29 April 2007	4 621 309	28,02%	25,88%
10	6 May 2007	5 601 889	32,54%	28,35%
Average	Season 5	4 949 989	28,27%	26,34%
