= Leontina =

- Gender: female

Other names
- Variant forms: Leontine, Leona

Leontina is female variant of the name Leo or Leon. Notable people with the surname include:

- Leontina Albina Espinoza (b. 1925 - d. 1998), woman from Chile
- Leontina Vaduva (b. 1960), Romanian soprano
- Leontina Vukomanović (b. 1970), female singer from Serbia

== See also ==
- 844 Leontina, an asteroid
