= Leontyna =

Leontyna may refer to:

- Leontyna, Masovian Voivodeship, a village in Poland
- Leontyna Halpertowa (1803–1895), Polish actress and translator

== See also ==
- Artur a Leontýna
- Leontyne
- Leontynów
