= Eurovision 2008 (disambiguation) =

The Eurovision Song Contest 2008 was the 53rd edition of the Eurovision Song Contest.

Eurovision 2008 may also refer to:

- Eurovision Dance Contest 2008, the second Eurovision Dance Contest that was held in September 2008
- Junior Eurovision Song Contest 2008, the sixth Junior Eurovision Song Contest that was held in November 2008
