= Leontine =

Leontine or Léontine is an English and French given name, a feminine form of Leontius. Notable people with the name include:

- Sister Leontine (1923–2012), Belgian Catholic nun, nurse and doctor
- Marie-Léontine Bordes-Pène (1858–1924), French pianist
- Leontine "Lona" Cohen (1913–1992), American spy for the Soviet Union
- Leontine Cooper (1837–1903), Australian trade unionist, suffragist and campaigner for women's rights
- Ethel Léontine Gabain (1883–1950), French-Scottish painter and lithographer
- Leontine Hippius (1868–?), Estonian politician
- Leontine T. Kelly (1920–2012), American Methodist bishop
- Léontine Lippmann (1844–1910), French literary muse and salon hostess
- Léontine de Maësen (1835–1906), Belgian soprano
- Leontine Nzeyimana (born 1973), Burundian politician
- Leontine Sagan (1889–1974), Austrian actress
- Léontine Stevens (1907–1998), Belgian sprinter
- Léontine Suétens (1846–1891), French laundress and communard
- Léontine Tsiba (born 1973), Congolese middle-distance runner
- Marie-Léontine Tsibinda (born 1958), Congolese writer
- Leontine van der Lienden (born 1959), Dutch cyclist
- Florence Leontine Welch (born 1986), English singer
- Léontine Zanta (1872–1942), French philosopher, feminist and novelist

== See also ==
- Leontine (film), 1968 French comedy crime film
- Leontine martyrs, clergy killed in Persia in 455 AD
- Leontien van Moorsel (born 1970), Dutch racing cyclist
- Rosa 'Léontine Gervais', a hybrid wichurana rose cultivar
- Leontyne, an alternative spelling of the name
