= Józef Cornobis =

Polish actor

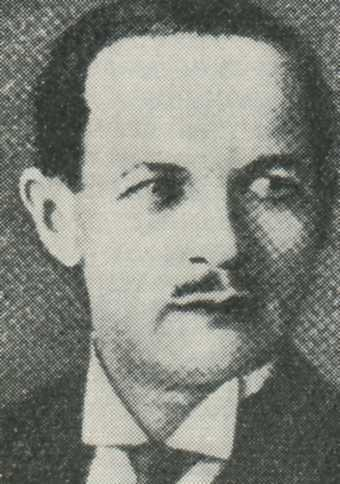
- Born: Józef Karol Cornobis; 28 June 1880; Kragola, Congress Poland
- Died: 1939–1940
- Occupations: Actor and director
- Years active: 1898–1939

Józef Karol Cornobis (28 June 1880 – 1939 or 1940) was a Polish theatre actor and director killed during the Second World War, either shot by German troops in Toruń in 1939 or murdered in Auschwitz concentration camp.

== See also ==
- List of Polish actors
