= City of Glasgow Chorus =

The City of Glasgow Chorus was founded in 1983 by Graham Taylor MBE, who served as musical director for 38 years. In 2021 Paul Kehone was appointed musical director.

The chorus has a policy of seeking less familiar pieces in addition to those from the mainstream choral repertoire. The City of Glasgow Chorus Trust is a Company limited by guarantee, with charitable status. It is registered in Scotland (113563), and its Registered Charity number is SC 004791.

== Concert series ==
The chorus performs a regular series of concerts each season, including the popular Christmas Cracker concert each December in the Glasgow Royal Concert Hall. In recent years, these have included a string of lesser known works by very well known composers - Andrew Lloyd Webber’s Requiem, Verdi’s Four Sacred Pieces, Holst’s Choral Symphony, Mendelssohn’s Die Erste Walpurgisnacht, Malcolm Arnold’s The Return of Odysseus, Bruckner’s Mass in F minor and Szymanowski’s Stabat Mater, as well as some of the more demanding parts of the repertoire including Walton's Belshazzar's Feast, Beethoven's Missa Solemnis, Berlioz's Grande Messe des Morts and Mahler’s Symphony No. 8 – the Symphony of a Thousand.

The chorus has recorded Scots songs with Iain Sutherland, performed and recorded Shaun Davey’s epic Celtic suite – The Pilgrim, taken part in the Star Wars World Tour with the Royal Philharmonic Concert Orchestra, backed Russell Watson and Sarah Brightman and appeared with Lesley Garrett in the televised Eurovision Dance Contest 2008 as the interval act. The Chorus appears regularly in concerts of West End and Broadway shows promoted by West End International.

== International ==
Notable overseas performances include concerts in Notre Dame Cathedral in Chartres, a tour of the Czech Republic in 1996, where the chorus performed the Prague premiere of William Walton’s oratorio, Belshazzar's Feast, with the Karlovy Vary Symphony Orchestra and in October 2013.

As part of their 30th anniversary celebrations, the chorus travelled to Poland for a week performing in Kraków and Opole including a performance of Verdi's Requiem with the Opole Philharmonic Orchestra of Poland.

In 2016 the chorus travelled to China performing Vaughan Williams’ A Sea Symphony in Beijing and Brahms’ German Requiem in Nanjing and Shanghai.

In November 2018, the chorus joined forces with the Leeds Festival Chorus for a performance of Britten’s War Requiem with the BBC Philharmonic in Leeds Town Hall as part of the 100th anniversary of The Armistice. On November 12, 2023 the Leeds Festival Chorus join the City of Glasgow Chorus and the Orchestra of Scottish Opera to perform Verdi's Requiem at the Glasgow Royal Concert Hall.

== Recordings ==
The Chorus has made a number of recordings, the most recent of which is a recording of Choral Classics: Something Old, Something New made in the Caird Hall in Dundee, with organist David Hamilton, which was released in November 2014.
