= Leontyne =

Leontyne is an alternative spelling of the English female given name Leontine. Notable people with the name include:

- Leontyne Butler King (1905–1976), American businesswoman and clubwoman
- Leontyne Price (born 1927), American soprano

== See also ==
- Leontyna (disambiguation)
