= Marie-Léontine Tsibinda =

Republic of Congo writer

- Born: 1958 (age 66–67); Republic of the Congo
- Citizenship: Republic of the Congo, Canada
- Occupation(s): Poet, writer, actor, librarian

Marie-Léontine Tsibinda Bilombo (born 1958) is a Republic of Congo writer. In 1981, she received the National Prize for Poetry. In 1996, the received the Prize Unesco-Aschberg. A native of Girard, she fled the Republic of Congo in 1999 during its civil war (1997–1999), stopping briefly in Niamey before settling in Canada in 2002.

== Publications ==
Tsibinda's works include:

=== Anthology ===
- Tsibinda, Marie-Léontine; Bemba, Sylvain (2000). Moi, Congo ou les rêveurs de la souveraineté (in French). Bajag-Meri: Jouy-Le-Moutier (France). ISBN 2-911147-07-3. OCLC 44649382. 204 pages. Anthology.

=== Poetry ===
- Tsibinda, Marie-Léontine (1980). Poèmes de la terre [Poems of the Earth] (in French). Brazzaville: Editions congolaises. OCLC 17050393. 16 pages.
- Tsibinda, Marie-Léontine (1980). Mayombe. Collection La Poésie la vie (in French). Paris: Editions Saint-Germain-des-Pres. OCLC 10080439. 59 pages.
- Tsibinda, Marie-Léontine (1984). Une Lèvre naissant d'une autre: poèmes [From one word to the next, poems]. Collection lettres congolaises, 1 (in French). Brazzaville, R.P. du Congo: P. Kivouvou, Editions Bantoues. ISBN 9783888270161. OCLC 12635241. 55 pages.
- Tsibinda, Marie-Léontine (1987). Demain un autre jour [Tomorrow is another day] (in French). Paris: Silex. ISBN 9782876930209. OCLC 19070445. 46 pages.
- Tsibinda, Marie-Léontine (1999). L'Oiseau sans arme [The defenceless bird.] (in French). Illustrated by Michel Hengo. Bajag-Meri: Jouy-Le-Moutier (France). ISBN 9782911147067. OCLC 468159906. 53 pages. Poetry.

=== Short stories ===
- "Mayangi", Peuples Noirs/Peuples Africains 20 (1981), pp. 148–151.
- "Quand gronde l'orage" ["When the storm rumbles"]. Publication details unknown, 1982.
- "La Princess d'ébène" [The black princess]. Amina (in French) (169): 64. 1 September 1985..
- Tsibinda, Marie-Léontine (1987). "L'irrésistible Dekha Danse". In Kintende, Maliza Mwina (ed.). Un voyage comme tant d'autres. et onze autres nouvelles [A Journey like so many others]. Monde noir poche, 29 (in French). Hatier, Abidjan, Paris: CEDA. ISBN 9782218071263. OCLC 468432349. 156 pages.
- Tsibinda, Marie-Léontine (2009). Les hirondelles de mer : et autres nouvelles (in French). Paris: Acoria. ISBN 9782355720192. OCLC 320799994. 191 pages.

=== Theater ===
- Tsibinda, Marie-Léontine (2013). La porcelaine de Chine : théatre. Collection Fugues/Paroles (in French). Ottawa, Ontario: L'Interligne. ISBN 9782896993741. OCLC 1464303584. 120 pages.
