= Quiero Bailar =

- Created by: Josep Maria Mainat & Toni Cruz
- Presented by: Josep Lobató
- Judges: Cristina Hoyos; Ramón Oller; Belén Lobo
- Country of origin: Spain
- Original language: Spanish
- No. of series: 1
- No. of episodes: 5

Production
- Producer: Gestmusic (part of Endemol)

Original release
- Network: TVE1
- Release: 14 June – 13 July 2008

¡Quiero Bailar! ('I Want to Dance!') is a Spanish television dance talent show contested by aspiring professional dancers, similar in concept to So You Think You Can Dance. The show, which premiered on 14 June on TVE1, aired live every Saturday from 14 June to 13 July 2008, originally on primetime. It was produced by Gestmusic, a Spanish branch of Endemol, at the TVE Studios in Sant Cugat del Vallès (near Barcelona), and it was hosted by Josep Lobató.

== Show format ==
The contest began with sixteen competitors (eight boys, eight girls) drawn from public auditions. Every week they have to prepare a choreography assigned by the program with the artistic help of two top choreographers, Nick Florez and Maria Torres. They mostly dance in interchangeable boy-girl pairs, but as the episodes go on they also dance in same-sex duos or groups. The choreographies can be of very different styles: jazz dance, street dance, latin dance, or fusion.

After the contestants perform live on the dancefloor, a professional panel (composed by Cristina Hoyos, Belén Lobo and Ramón Oller) evaluates their work individually and nominates four of them for eviction. The nominees get a minute each to dance freely to a music they have chosen. The audience decides by televoting who of the nominees proceed in the contest: the two contestants with most votes are saved.

== Winner ==
Winner of the show was specialist in modern dances Nieto. Along with the top prize he also won the chance to represent Spain in the Eurovision Dance Contest 2008 with internally chosen celebrity singer Rosa López, who had won another TV dance competition, ¡Mira quién baila!. Eventually TVE announced its withdrawal from the contest on 20 August, just days before the contest took place.

== See also ==
- Spain in the Eurovision Dance Contest
- Eurovision Dance Contest 2008
