= Eurovision Dance Contest 2008 =

International dance competition

Date and venue
- Final: 6 September 2008
- Venue: SEC Centre; Glasgow, United Kingdom

Organisation
- Organiser: European Broadcasting Union (EBU)
- Executive supervisor: Tal Barnea

Production
- Host broadcaster: BBC Scotland (BBC)
- Director: Nikki Parsons
- Executive producer: Alan Tyler
- Presenters: Graham Norton; Claudia Winkleman

Participants
- Number of entries: 14
- Debuting countries: Azerbaijan
- Non-returning countries: Germany; Spain; Switzerland
- Participation map: Participating countries Countries that participated in the past but not in 2008

Vote
- Voting system: Each country awards 1–8, 10, and 12 points to their 10 favourite acts, plus additional panel of experts awards maximum of 48 points to their favourites.
- Winning dancers: Poland; Edyta Herbuś and Marcin Mroczek

The Eurovision Dance Contest 2008 was the second and final edition of the Eurovision Dance Contest, held on 6 September 2008 at the SEC Centre in Glasgow, United Kingdom, and presented by Graham Norton and Claudia Winkleman. It was organised by the European Broadcasting Union (EBU) and host broadcaster, BBC Scotland (BBC). It featured the participation of dance couples from fourteen countries.

The winners of contest were Edyta Herbuś and Marcin Mroczek representing Poland who achieved a score of 154 points. Russia placed 2nd, Ukraine 3rd, Lithuania 4th and Azerbaijan, participating for the first time, were 5th.

In a change to the rules, professional couples were no longer eligible to enter the contest. At least one dancer from each couple had to be a local celebrity, not professionally trained to dance. A further change was that each couple only performed once. In 2007 each couple performed a ballroom or Latin routine followed by a freestyle dance incorporating national flavour; in the 2008 contest, the latter freestyle dance continued and this time could include elements of traditional Latin and ballroom. A panel of experts was introduced with an approximate weight of 23% of the total outcome and the rest 77% determined through televoting. The highest possible points from the jury were 48 while the televoting cast a maximum of 156 points.

== Location ==
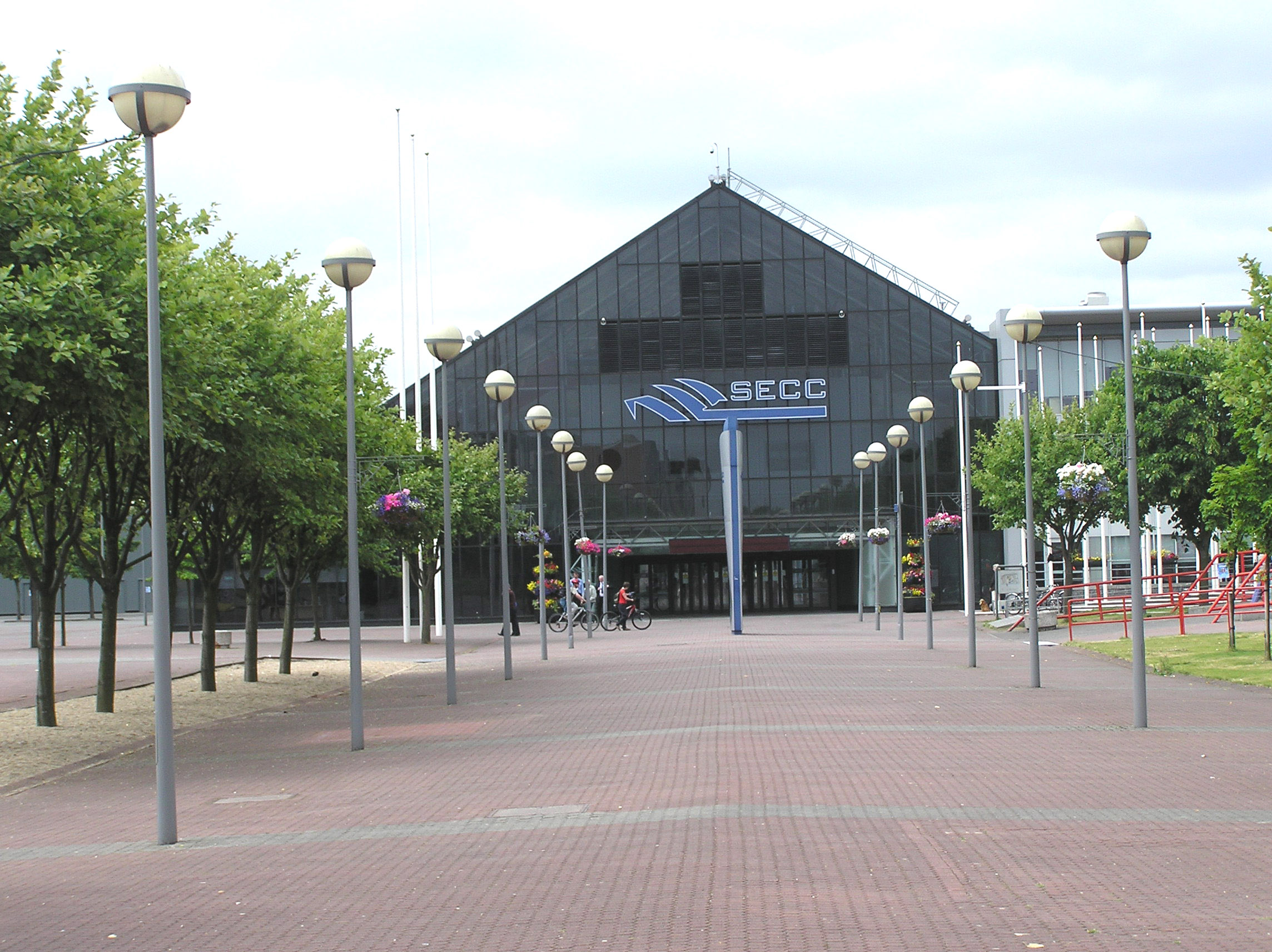
SEC Centre, in Glasgow – host venue of the 2008 contest.

The SEC Centre is Scotland's largest exhibition centre, located in the district of Finnieston on the north bank of the River Clyde, Glasgow. The venue's holding company SEC Limited, is 91% owned by Glasgow City Council and 9% owned by private investors. It is probably best known for hosting concerts, particularly in Hall 4 and Hall 3.

Since the opening of the original buildings in 1985, the complex has undergone two major expansions; the first being the SEC Armadillo in 1997, and then the OVO Hydro arena in 2013.

The host city and venue was announced by the British Broadcasting Corporation (BBC) on 7 July 2008. The contest was attended by an audience of 2,000.

== Format ==
=== Rules and participants ===
According to the 2007 rules Section 2.2 on the official website, all participating broadcasters in the Eurovision Dance Contest 2007 agreed to take part in 2008 when signing up for the first contest. However, in June 2008, the Swiss Broadcasting Corporation (SRG SSR) announced its withdrawal from the contest without specifying a reason, while German ARD also decided to withdraw from the event later the same month, due to comparatively low ratings for the 2007 contest in the country.

The running order was announced on 8 August. Due to a scheduling clash with the 2010 FIFA World Cup preliminaries, Spanish Radiotelevisión Española (RTVE) announced its late withdrawal on 28 August, just days before the contest was scheduled to take place. In July, RTVE had held a national selection show titled Quiero Bailar, and had appointed singer Rosa López and dancer Nieto as its representatives in the contest. According to the draw they were supposed to be 15th couple to perform.

As the number of dances was reduced, with each couple performing once instead of twice, new broadcasters were allowed to enter the competition, but the only new to enter was Azerbaijani İctimai Television (İTV).

On 2 September 2008, a press conference was held with all the couples participating in the competition, as well as the official opening ceremony at the BBC Pacific Quay headquarters in Glasgow. The next day, stage rehearsals for the competition began at the adjacent venue, during which each couple had 30 minutes to practice their choreography on the dance floor. On 5 September, the day before the televised final, a camera dress rehearsal took place during which the judges awarded fictitious scores to the couples.

=== Opening and interval acts ===
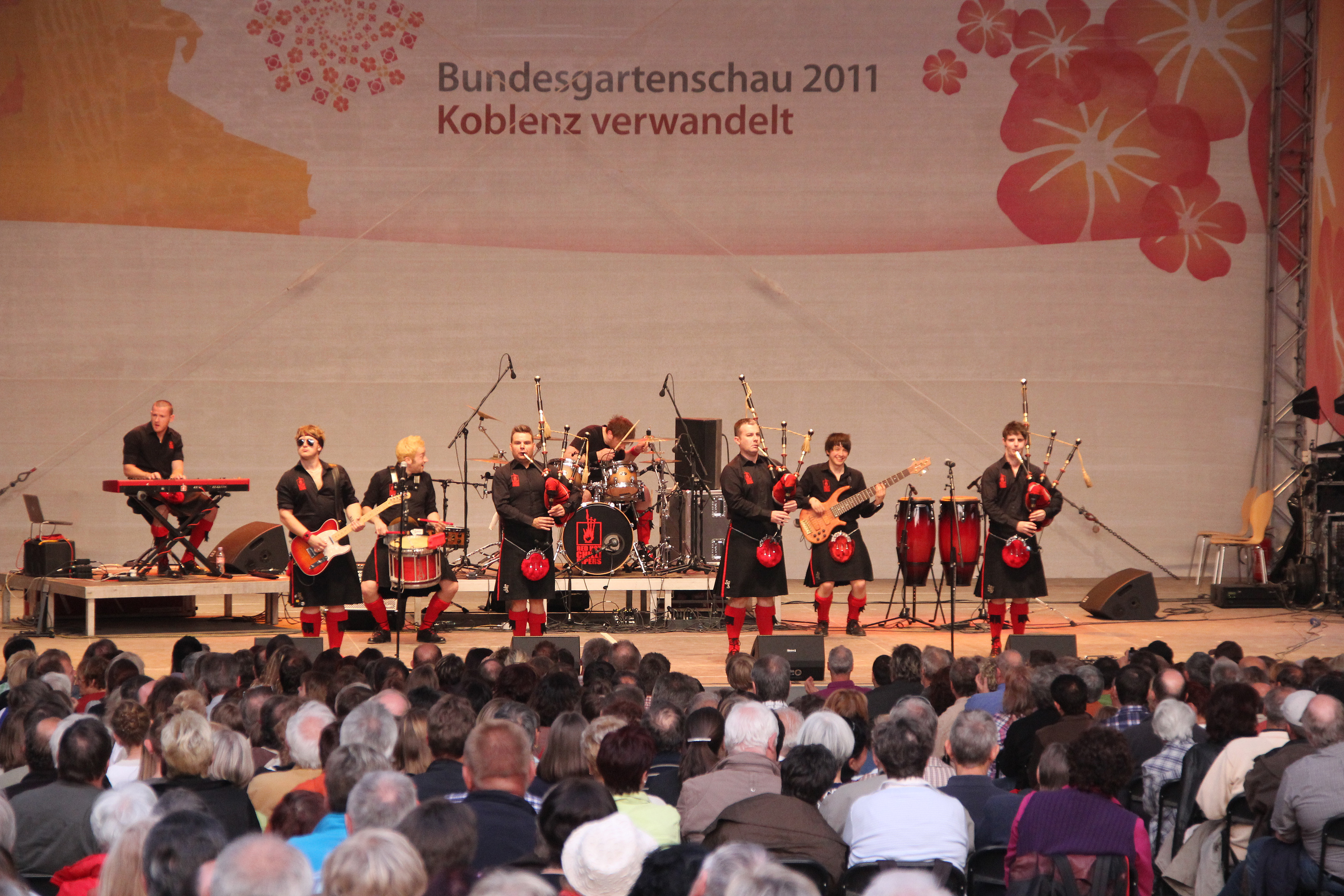
Celtic rock band Red Hot Chilli Pipers performed as part of the opening act.

The opening of the show featured Red Hot Chilli Pipers playing a Scottish-flavoured medley of known songs, with all participating couples presented on stage in order of performance. The interval act featured a group dance routine to a medley of songs and was followed by soprano Lesley Garrett and the Carousel cast, performing a medley of "June Is Bustin' Out All Over" and "You'll Never Walk Alone" accompanied by the City of Glasgow Chorus.

== Controversy ==
Azerbaijan and Greece announced professional dance couples as their representatives at the Eurovision Dance Contest 2008. According to the regulations of the contest, professional couples were not allowed to take part in the competition. The EBU specified that the couple had to be composed of one professional (defined as a dancer who earns his or her living through dance and dance-related activities), and one non-professional known in a field other than dance. The non-professional was not required to be a celebrity, as long as he or she was known in his field, and it was also not a requirement that the non-professional had no dance experience. Since the representatives for Azerbaijan and Greece both consisted of two professional dancers, however, it is not clear why their entries were considered valid.

== Participants ==
Participants and results
R/O	Country	Broadcaster	Competing dancers	Dance styles	Points	Place
1	Sweden	TV4	Danny Saucedo and Jeanette Carlsson	Cha-Cha	38	12
2	Austria	ORF	Dorian Steidl and Nicole Kuntner	Slowfox; Jive; Hip-Hop	29	13
3	Denmark	DR	Patrick Spiegelberg and Katja Svensson	Samba; Tango; Paso Doble; Jazz Dance	102	6
4	Azerbaijan	İTV	Eldar Dzhafarov and Anna Sazhina	Paso Doble; Rumba; Tango; Azeri Folk Dance	106	5
5	Ireland	RTÉ	Gavin Ó Fearraigh and Dearbhla Lennon	Paso Doble; Rumba; Hard Shoe Irish Dance	40	11
6	Finland	Yle	Maria Lund and Mikko Ahti	Tango	44	10
7	Netherlands	NPO	Thomas Berge and Roemjana de Haan	Rumba; Show Dance	1	14
8	Lithuania	LRT	Karina Krysko and Saulius Skambinas	Rumba; Cha-Cha; Acrobatic Elements	110	4
9	United Kingdom	BBC	Louisa Lytton and Vincent Simone	Paso Doble; Jive; Tango	47	9
10	Russia	C1R	Tatiana Navka and Alexander Litvinenko	Cha-Cha; Samba; Rumba; Paso Doble; Russian Folk Dance	121	2
11	Greece	ERT	Jason Roditis and Tonia Kosovich	Latin dances	72	7
12	Portugal	RTP	Raquel Tavares and João Tiago	Rumba; Tango	61	8
13	Poland	TVP	Edyta Herbuś and Marcin Mroczek	Rumba; Cha-Cha; Jazz Dance	154	1
14	Ukraine	NTU	Lilia Podkopayeva and Sergey Kostetskiy	Jive; Ukrainian Folk Dance; Rock'n'Roll	119	3

== Scoreboard ==
It is worth noting that, had the judges not been introduced (and thus only the televote been used), Poland would still have won the competition by 31 points. However, Ukraine and Russia would have shifted places therefore Ukraine would have finished 2nd and Russia finishing 3rd.

Voting results
Voting procedure used: 100% televoting 100% jury vote		Total score	Televoting score	Expert jury score	Televote													
Voting procedure used: 100% televoting 100% jury vote		Total score	Televoting score	Expert jury score	Sweden	Austria	Denmark	Azerbaijan	Ireland	Finland	Netherlands	Lithuania	United Kingdom	Russia	Greece	Portugal	Poland	Ukraine
Contestants	Sweden	38	34	4		3	10			7		1	2	2	2	3	4	
Contestants	Austria	29	29				3	2	1	3		4	5	4	5	1		1
Contestants	Denmark	102	54	48	8	7		1	3	8	2	6	4		1	7	2	5
Contestants	Azerbaijan	106	78	28	5	8			7	1	4	12	1	10	6	4	12	8
Contestants	Ireland	40	40				4	6		2		5	8	7			6	2
Contestants	Finland	44	32	12	12		6	5			1	3				2	3	
Contestants	Netherlands	1	1			1												
Contestants	Lithuania	110	78	32	7		7	4	10	6	5		10	5	4	5	8	7
Contestants	United Kingdom	47	39	8	1	4	5	3	8		10			1	3		1	3
Contestants	Russia	121	97	24	6	6	2	8	4	12	8	10			12	10	7	12
Contestants	Greece	72	32	40	4	2			2	5	3		3	3		6		4
Contestants	Portugal	61	61		3	5	1	7	6		6	2	7	6	7		5	6
Contestants	Poland	154	134	20	10	12	12	10	12	10	12	8	12	8	10	8		10
Contestants	Ukraine	119	103	16	2	10	8	12	5	4	7	7	6	12	8	12	10	

=== 12 points ===
The maximum twelve points awarded by each country (to the couple who had received the most phone votes) were allocated as follows:

N.	Contestant	Nation(s) giving 12 points
5	Poland	Austria, Denmark, Ireland, Netherlands, United Kingdom
3	Russia	Finland, Greece, Ukraine
3	Ukraine	Azerbaijan, Portugal, Russia
2	Azerbaijan	Lithuania, Poland
1	Finland	Sweden

=== Professional jury ===
An expert jury of International DanceSport Federation judges from non-participating countries acted as a jury in the contest. After each performance, each jury member awarded each performance up to 12 points. The jury members were:

- Juror A: Singapore – Gladys Tay (head judge)
- Juror B: Germany – Sven Traut
- Juror C: Slovenia – Barbara Nagode Ambrož
- Juror D: France – Michelle Ribas

The points below were converted (giving the jury vote the weight of four countries' votes in the total result) into 4 sets of 12 points, 12 for the first place couple on the jury leaderboard, 10 points for second, 8 points for third and so on, down to 1 point for 10th. The other four couples, do not receive any points from the judges.

Detailed jury votes
R/O	Song	Jurors				Total	Score
R/O	Song	Juror A	Juror B	Juror C	Juror D	Total	Score
1	Sweden	8	8	8	7	31	4
2	Austria	7	7	7	7	28	0
3	Denmark	12	12	12	12	48	48
4	Azerbaijan	12	10	10	10	42	28
5	Ireland	7	7	8	7	29	0
6	Finland	10	8	8	8	34	12
7	Netherlands	8	7	7	6	28	0
8	Lithuania	12	10	10	10	42	32
9	United Kingdom	8	10	8	8	34	8
10	Russia	10	12	10	10	42	24
11	Greece	10	12	12	10	44	40
12	Portugal	8	7	8	7	30	0
13	Poland	10	10	12	8	40	20
14	Ukraine	10	10	10	8	38	16

=== Spokespersons ===
The order in which each country announced their votes was done in order of performance. The spokespersons are shown alongside each country.

1. Sweden – Carin da Silva
2. Austria – Marvin Wolf
3. Denmark – Jens Blauenfeldt
4. Azerbaijan – Husniyya Maharramova
5. Ireland – Brian Osmond
6. Finland – Jaana Pelkonen
7. Netherlands – Marcus van Teijlingen
8. Lithuania – Audrius Giržadas
9. United Kingdom – Carol Smillie
10. Russia – Larisa Verbitskaya
11. Greece – Rika Vagianni
12. Portugal – Helena Coelho
13. Poland – Anna Popek
14. Ukraine – Yuliya Okropiridze

== Broadcasts ==
Most broadcasters sent commentators to Glasgow or commentated from their own country, in order to add insight to the participants and, if necessary, provide voting information.

In addition to the participating countries, the event was also broadcast in Albania, Armenia, Belarus, Bosnia and Herzegovina, Cyprus, Macedonia, Iceland, Israel, Malta, and Spain. In accordance with the rules, Spanish RTVE were obliged to broadcast the contest live due to their late withdrawal as an active participant. The EBU initially confirmed that the event would be broadcast on the network's second channel La 2 "for the benefit of Spanish viewers", however RTVE later confirmed it would be delayed by one hour without specifying a reason. Special Broadcasting Service (SBS) also broadcast the contest in Australia on 6 May 2009, as a lead up to the Eurovision Song Contest 2009. This was the first time SBS had broadcast the Eurovision Dance Contest, after failing to broadcast the 2007 edition, and was aired without any commentary.

Broadcasters and commentators in participating countries
Country	Channel(s)	Commentator(s)	Ref(s)
Austria	ORF 2	Andi Knoll and Nicole Burns-Hansen	
Azerbaijan	Ictimai TV	Leyla Aliyeva and Murad Ragimov	
Denmark	DR1	Sisse Fisker and Claus Larsen	
Finland	Yle TV2	Sirpa Suutari-Jääskö and Johanna Pirttilahti	
Greece	NET, ERT World	Maria Kozakou and Voula Santorineou	
Ireland	RTÉ One	Marty Whelan and Brian Redmond	
Lithuania	LRT	Asta Einikytė and Virginijus Visockas	
Netherlands	Nederland 1	Lucille Werner and Cor van de Stroet	
Poland	TVP2	Artur Orzech and Zbigniew Zasada	
Portugal	RTP1, RTP Internacional, RTP África	Isabel Angelino and Alberto Rodrigues	
Russia	Channel One	Yana Churikova and Stanislav Popov	
Sweden	TV4	David Hellenius and Tony Irving	
Ukraine	Pershyi Natsionalnyi	Timur Miroshnychenko and Miroslav Keba	
United Kingdom	BBC One	Len Goodman and Craig Revel Horwood	

Broadcasters and commentators in non-participating countries
Country	Channel(s)	Commentator(s)	Ref(s)
Albania	RTSH	Leon Menkshi	
Armenia	ARMTV	Felix Khacatryan and Hrachuhi Utmazyan	
Australia	SBS (broadcast on 6 May 2009)	No commentary	
Belarus	Belarus-1	Denis Kurian and Tatyana Bondarchuck	
Bosnia and Herzegovina	BHT 1 (delayed)	Dejan Kukrić	
Cyprus	RIK 1, RIK Sat	Melina Karageorgiou	
Iceland	RÚV (delayed)	Eva María Jónsdótttir	
Israel	Channel 1 (delayed)	No commentary	
Macedonia	MKRTV	Milanka Rašić	
Malta	TVM	Eileen Montesin	
Spain	La 2, TVE Internacional (delayed)	Sandra Daviú	

=== Viewing figures ===
Estimated viewership by country (in millions)
Country	Viewership	Ref(s)
Austria	0.49	
Poland	4.3	
Portugal	0.87	
United Kingdom	4.7	

== See also ==
- Eurovision Song Contest 2008
- Eurovision Young Musicians 2008
- Junior Eurovision Song Contest 2008
