= Kabaret Starszych Panów =

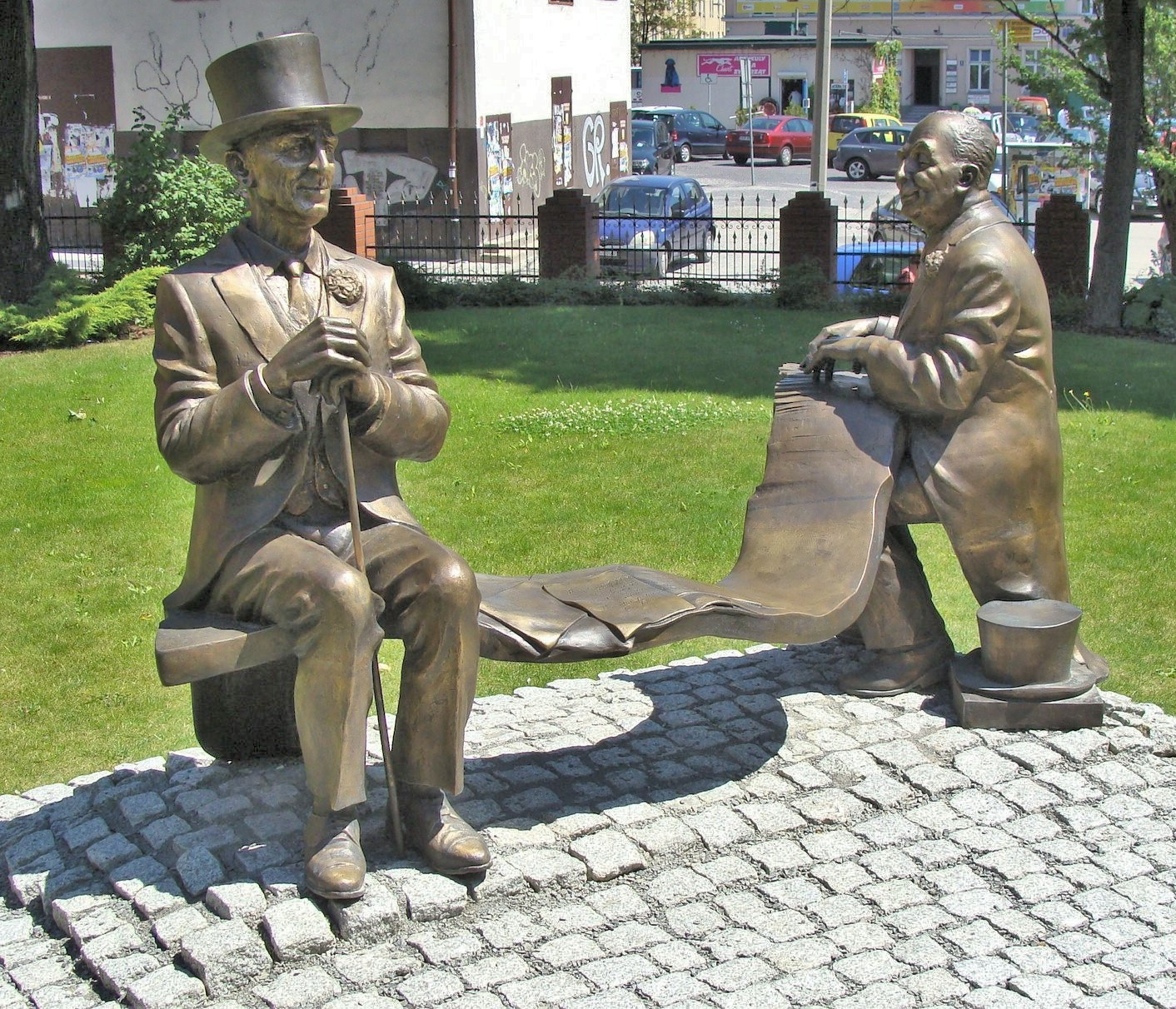
Two Older Gentlemen, a sculpture dedicated to Jeremi Przybora and Jerzy Wasowski in their cabaret attires, Opole

Kabaret Starszych Panów (Elderly Gentlemen's Cabaret) was a Polish satirical cabaret (Polish term for revue) made for TV in the late 1950s to mid-1960s (1958–1966). Numerous leading actors and performers participated in its episodes. The hosts and producers were Jerzy Wasowski and Jeremi Przybora, the two aging male Polish actors mentioned in the cabaret's name. Their performances gained a country-wide popularity.

== Style ==
The Cabaret was founded and led by composer Jerzy Wasowski (1913-1984) and writer Jeremi Przybora (1915-2004), the two older gentlemen in the cabaret's title. Wasowski wrote the music, and Przybora, the TV script. The cabaret focused on two Bourgeoisie characters, Pan A and Pan B (Mr. A and Mr. B) "in dinner jackets, bowler hats, and with carnations in their button holes," who tried to find themselves in the new world of communist People's Republic of Poland, invariably poking fun at the changing reality. Their humor has been described as "absurdist, sophisticated and elegant". Music formed an important element of the cabaret's style, leading some critics to assert that the show was less of cabaret and more of a "musical theatre of absurd". Many top Polish actors of that time played in the cabaret as guests. Most notable performers included Mieczysław Czechowicz, Edward Dziewoński, Wiesław Gołas, Kalina Jędrusik, Irena Kwiatkowska, Barbara Krafftówna, and Wiesław Michnikowski.

== History, influence and legacy ==
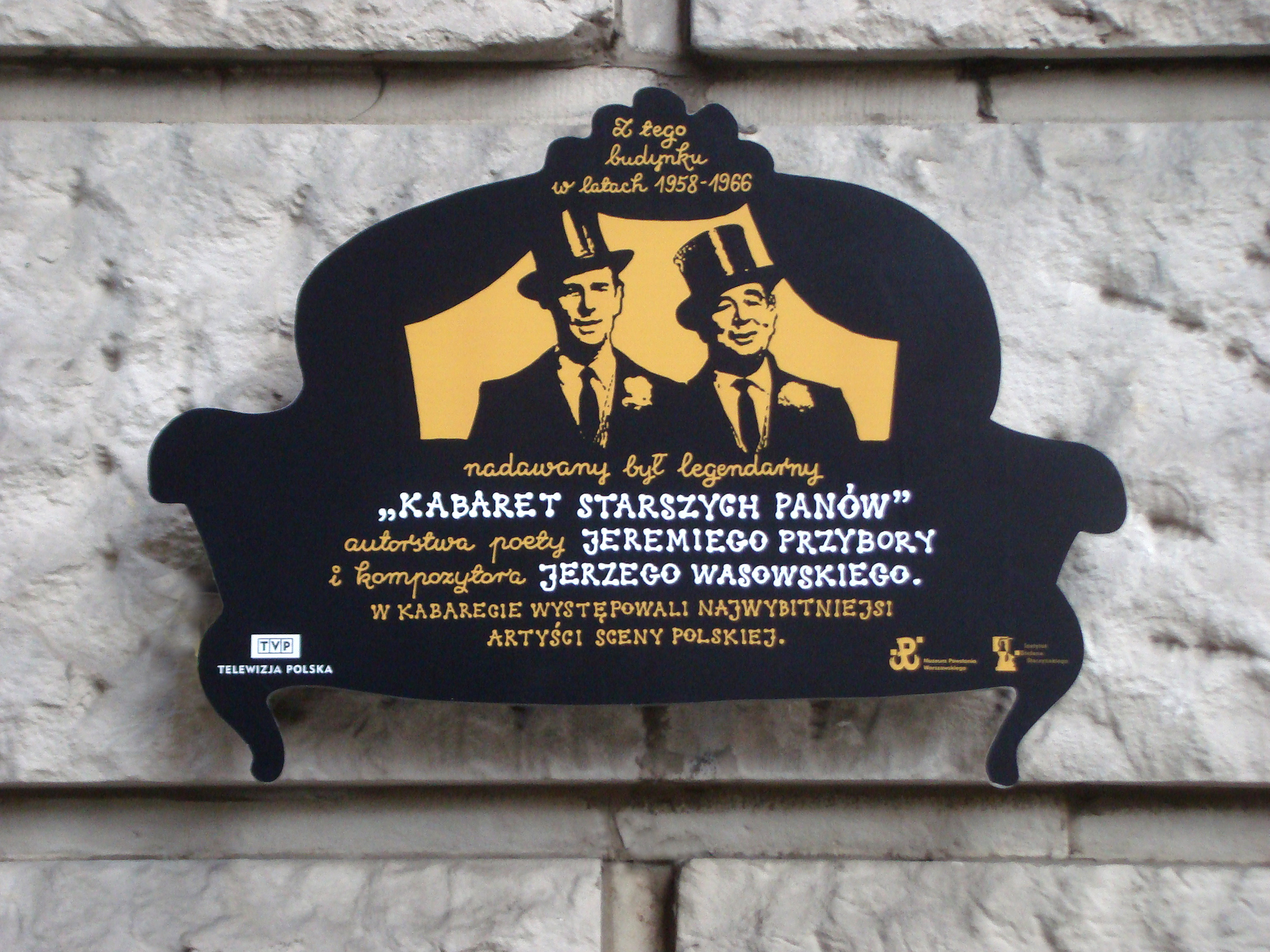
Memorial plate for Jeremi Przybora and Jerzy Wasowski and their show on Polish TV building in Warsaw.

Wasowski and Przybora began professional cooperation in 1948 in radio shows. The cabaret was created in Warsaw in 1958 and was active till 1966. It aired on Polish Television at a time when all TV broadcasting was state-run. Unlike modern shows, airing on a weekly basis, their shows on censored television took months to prepare, and in the end, during the eight years they only created sixteen episodes. It quickly gained significant Poland-wide popularity; even though many people still did not own TV sets. During the late-night hours when the programme was aired, families and friends congregated in the houses where the show could be watched. The cabaret was eventually moved to a prime time slot. Its popularity led to a film, starring the same characters, called Upał (1964), and directed by Kazimierz Kutz. The early TV programs were not archived, and about half of them have been lost. They were recast in 1978-1980 as the Kabaret Jeszcze Starszych Panów (The Even Older Gentlemen's Cabaret). The cabaret was disbanded in 1968, as Wasowski decided he was too old to keep performing, and felt that it is better to end the show when their performance is still strong, rather than wait for its future decline.

In 2011 the National Bank of Poland issued a coin featuring Wasowaski and Przybora, in their cabaret attire, in a series for "artists seen as instrumental in bringing their style of entertainment to national attention". The series has been called cult and legendary; when technology permitted, it has been rereleased in the VHS and more recently, CD and DVD formats, and repeats are still shown on Polish television channels.
