= Marianna Franciszka Pierożyńska =

Polish stage actress and opera singer (1763–1816)

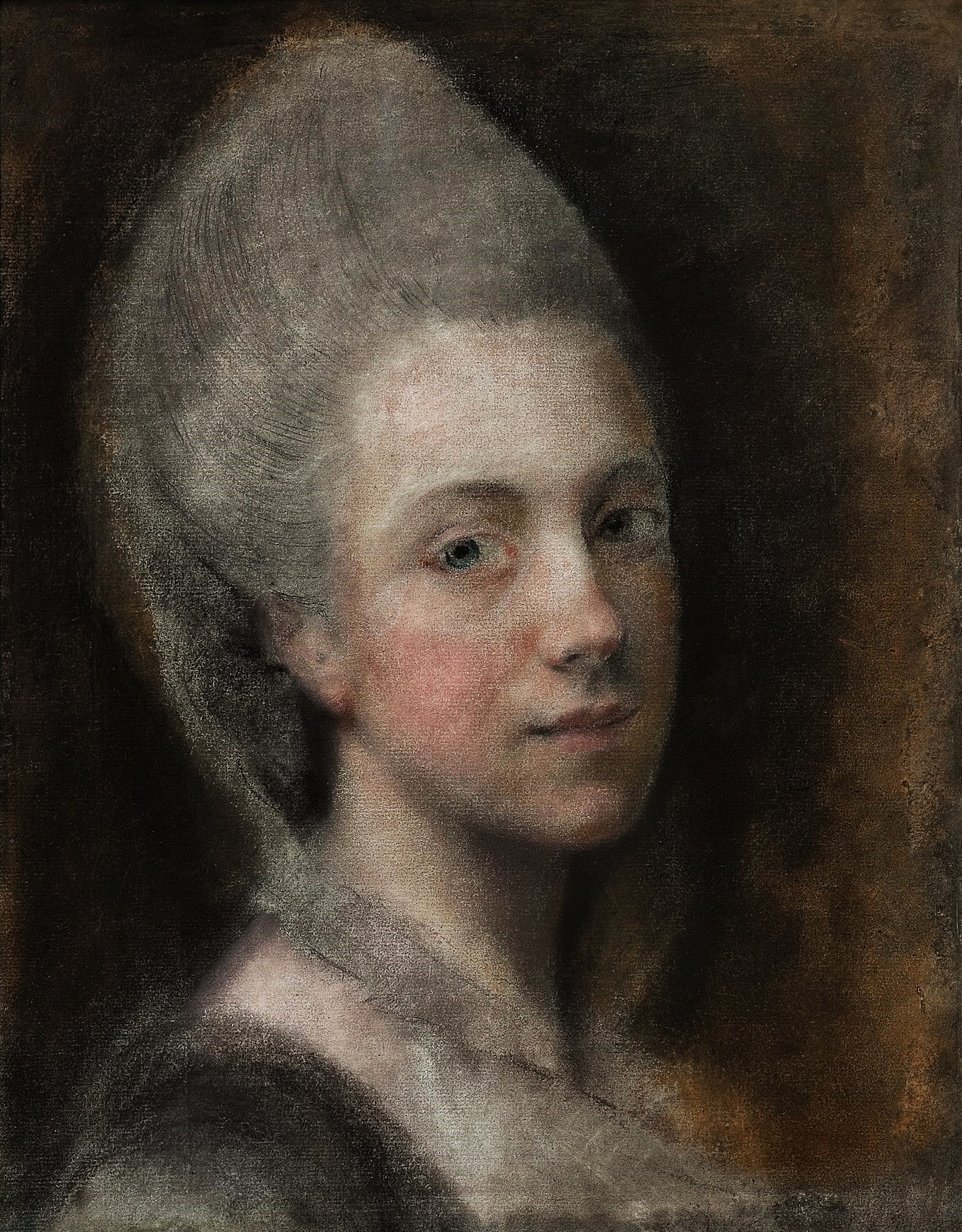
Pastel portrait of Marianna Pierożyńska by Louis-François Marteau, 1780–1788, National Museum in Warsaw

Marianna Franciszka Pierożyńska (1763–1816) was a Polish stage actress and opera singer, active 1778–1809.

She belonged to a theater family and married her colleague L. Pierożyński. She debuted in 1778, and was a successful operetta singer for some years. She was employed at the National Theatre, Warsaw from 1786 until 1794. During that time, she was regarded as a part of the elite of the national stage and often played the female main parts in tragedies and drama. She was admired specifically for her ability to play passion. She retired for health reasons in 1795, and temporarily resumed her career in 1804 before being granted a pension in 1810.
