= Leontina Albina Espinoza =

Chilean woman; one of the world's most prolific mother

Leontina Judith Albina Espinoza (1925 – August 7, 1998) was a woman from Colina, Chile, who in 1983 was claimed to be the world's most prolific living mother, after claiming to have given birth to 58 children. It was later discovered that only 14 of those children were hers, with the others having been picked up by relatives or off the streets and registered as her children in an attempt to defraud the government. One of the children was also found to be the product of incestuous rape by her husband on one of their granddaughters.

She entered the Guinness Book of Records in 1983, which reported that she had given birth to 58 children. According to her husband Gerardo Secundo Albina, the couple were married in 1946 in Argentina, and had five sets of triplets – all boys – before emigrating to Chile. By the late 1980s "only" 40 of the children – 24 boys and 16 girls – were said to be still alive, and the Associated Press reported that 18 of them were still living with the couple in their cramped two-room shack on the outskirts of Santiago.

The others were scattered around the world, from Japan to Sweden to the United States.

== Biography ==
Leontina was said to have been abandoned as an infant along with her two brothers. They were raised in a church-run orphanage, but were separated when the brothers were adopted while she stayed behind in the orphanage.

At the age of 12, she ran away and married Gerardo, a 30-year-old mule driver. She said that because she had been abandoned as an infant, she had pledged never to give up any children. Despite being aged between 59 and 62 at the time of the Times interview, she was open to the prospect of more children, though she recognised that it would be a struggle: "If God sends them to me, yes. But I'd like God to also consider me, now that I'm approaching old age."

She had tried birth control with an intrauterine device but it was not a success: "I got pregnant anyway and nearly died ... I think it was a punishment from God for doing something I shouldn't."

When Leontina's story became public she became something of a celebrity in Chile. She appeared on the popular television show Sábados Gigante de Don Francisco, whose host Mario Kreutzberger (aka Don Francisco) presented her with an award for her fertility and maternal devotion. The country's major daily newspapers all wrote feature articles about her under headlines such as "The Incredible Story of Lady Leontina, Wife of the 'Infallible' Cowhand Gerardo Albina" (as La Tercera put it).

Although her papers at the Chilean Civil Registry showed that she had given birth to 20 children since 1955, she was unable to prove that she had had the remaining children: "I don't have any records on the children who were born before 1955. Everything was lost in a fire in Argentina." Because it was unable to verify the exact number of her children (estimates ranged from 55 to 64), in 1991 Guinness decided to delete Leontina's record.

Chilean authorities started to become suspicious of her claims as she registered the birth of another child in 1995 at the age of 69: only three women have ever been recorded as giving birth past the age of 66. After she died of diabetes on August 7, 1998, a subsequent police investigation found that she had actually given birth to only 14 of her claimed children, with the remainder being taken in from the streets or given to her by poor women including her cousins.

According to police inspector Cristina Rojo, Leontina had perpetrated the fraud to claim food assistance from the Chilean government, and had systematically registered the children in rural civic offices that lacked computerised records to avoid detection.

One of these children was also discovered to be the product of an incestuous relationship between her husband, Geraldo, and one of the couple's granddaughters. Geraldo, who was 91 at the time, was said to be a fugitive, while police were also reported to be investigating a number of the couple's other children and relatives for having taken part in the fraud.

== Sources ==
- The Guinness Book of World Records 1988. Guinness Publications. 1987. ISBN 9780965238359.
- Cisternas, Carlos (November 13, 1980). "44 Children ... And Chilean Woman Says Her 45th Is Due In Five Months". Associated Press.
- "Mother's Day lost for mom of 53 kids". Associated Press. May 8, 1988.
- "Prolific Chilean mother was a fraud". Associated Press. May 20, 2001.
- "Fraude en el libro de Guinnes". EFE. March 28, 2010.
- Muzam, Jorge (May 9, 2010). "La mujer más prolífica del mundo". hispanicLA.
