= Marcin Mroczek =

Polish actor and dancer

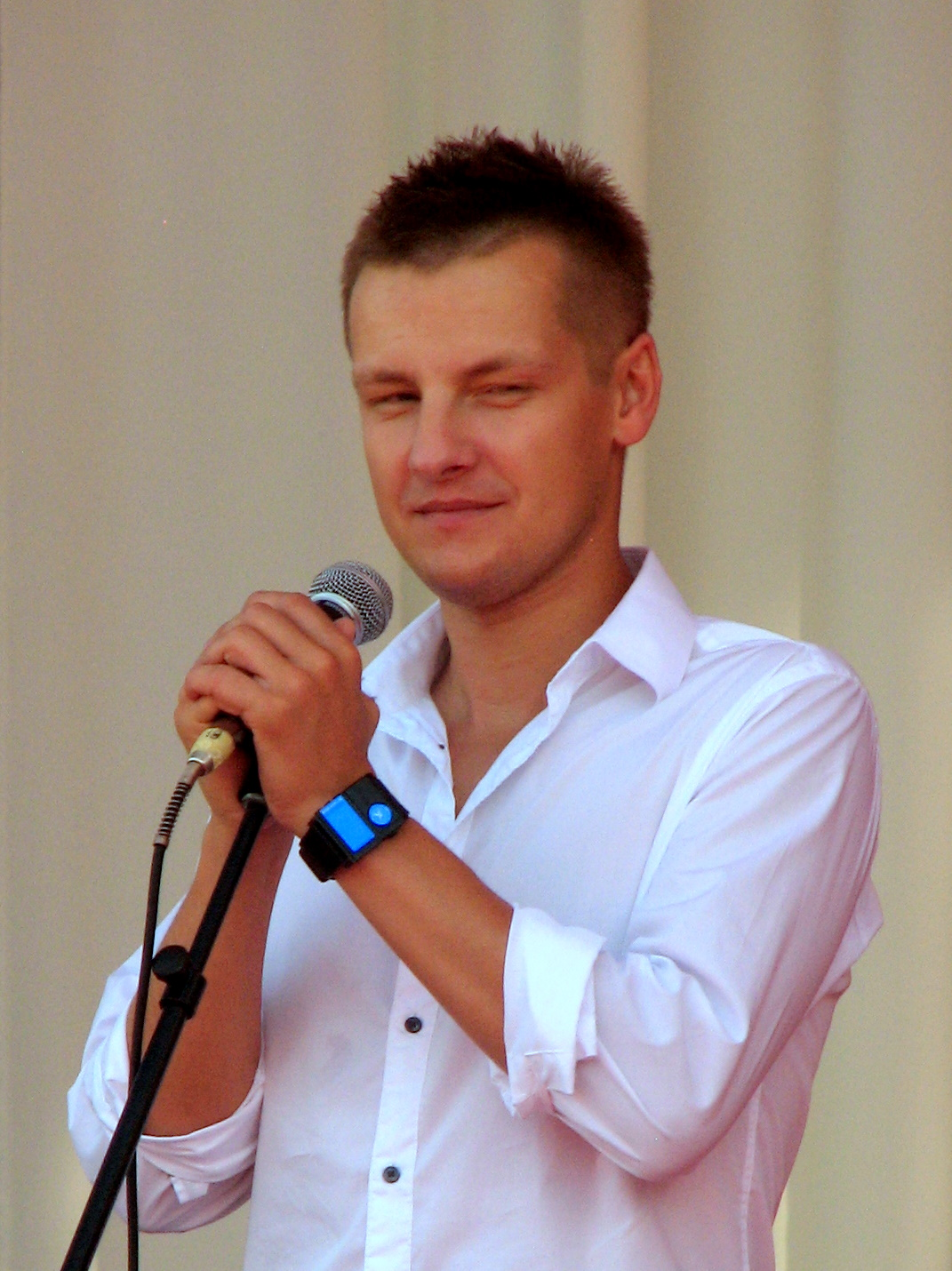
Marcin Mroczek, 2010

Marcin Mroczek (born 18 July 1982) is a Polish actor and dancer.

== Life and career ==
He was born on 18 July 1982 in Siedlce, Poland. He has a twin brother Rafał who is 7 minutes older. At the age of 10, Marcin joined the Modern Dance Team “Caro Dance” in Siedlce. Together with this team, he won multiple Polish and European championships. He says that this was an amazing time in his life: for the very first time, he entered the stage and could meet his audience! When he was 18, Marcin and his brother Rafał won the casting for roles of twin brothers in the most popular Polish TV series - M jak Miłość. One third of Poland followed the fate of the heroes on weekdays. This success has given Marcin the possibility to appear in numerous programs and television shows. Currently Marcin plays a role in the very popular TV series “L as Love”. Moreover, he started the company “Mroczek House”.

He won the Polish Show!Time and took third place in Dancing with the Stars: Taniec z gwiazdami, the Polish version of the British reality TV competition Strictly Come Dancing. He danced with Edyta Herbuś. In 2007, he also took part in the Ukrainian edition of Dancing with the Stars, which he won. As an adolescent, he and his brother performed in Caro Dance. On 6 September 2008, he won the Eurovision Dance Contest 2008 for Poland.

== Filmography ==
- since 2000: M jak miłość as Piotr Zduński
- 2003: Stara baśń - kiedy słońce było bogiem as Leszek
