= Peuples Noirs/Peuples Africains =

Former political periodical of black francophone Africa

- Categories: Political magazine
- Frequency: Bimonthly
- Founder: Mongo Beti and Odile Tobner
- Founded: 1978
- First issue: January/February 1978
- Final issue: 1991
- Country: Cameroon
- Language: French

Peuples Noirs/Peuples Africains (English: Black Peoples/African Peoples) was a bimonthly African political periodical that ran from 1978 to 1991. The first issue was published in Cameroon in January/February 1978. It was created by Mongo Beti and his spouse Odile Tobner, who fought for human rights for political prisoners in Francophone Africa, and especially in Cameroon.

Quoted from the first issue from January/February 1978 (translated from French):

Eighteen years after some independence in some states, finally an important black publication controlled financially, ideologically, and technically by black francophone Africans, and by them alone.

== See also ==
- Françafrique
