= Tadeusz Skarzyński =

Polish actor

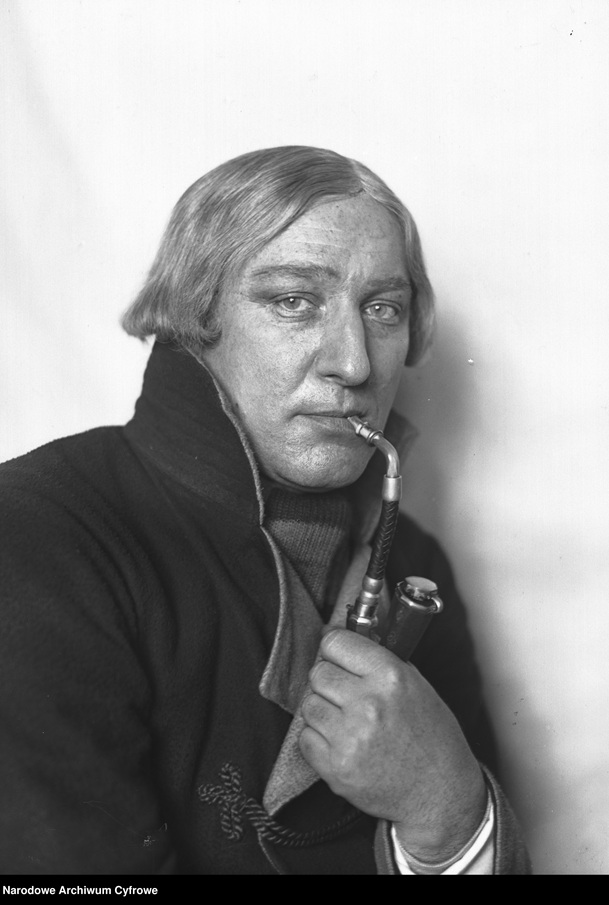
- Born: 10 April 1886; Kutno, Congress Poland
- Died: 2 April 1944 (aged 57); Radom, German-occupied Poland
- Occupations: Actor and director
- Years active: 1908–1939

Tadeusz Skarzyński (10 April 1886 – 2 April 1944) was a Polish actor and director. He was active in theatre and film between 1908 and 1939. A resistance member during the Second World War, Skarzyński was arrested by the Gestapo and died in custody in Radom in April 1944.

== Select filmography ==
- Sezonowa milosc (1918)
- Rozporek i Ska (1918)
- Nie damy ziemi, skad nasz ród (1920)
