= Janina Klimkiewicz =

Polish actress

Janina Klimkiewicz, real name Klimkowska (born 15 February 1891 in Warsaw – 30 December 1959 in Jastrzębia Góra) was a Polish actress.

She was a daughter of Adam and Bronisława. She made her debut in 1918 in Teatr Praski (Prague Theatre) in Warsaw. She played in this theatre to 1920. Then she performed in revue Wesoły Ul in Lublin and Wojciech Bogusławski's Theatre in Warsaw. In 30. he played in theatrical performances organized by Towarzystwa Krzewienia Kultury Teatralnej.

During World War II she worked at Rada Główna Opiekuńcza (Central Welfare Council). After 1945 she played rarely in Warsaw.

== Filmography ==
Year	Title	Role	Notes
1928	Pan Tadeusz	Wojszczanka	

== Bibliography ==
- Jerzy Maśnicki, Kamil Stepan, Pleograf. Słownik biograficzny filmu polskiego 1896–1939, Staromiejska Oficyna Wydawnicza, Kraków 1996
