= Jens Blauenfeldt =

Danish actor and director (born 1968)

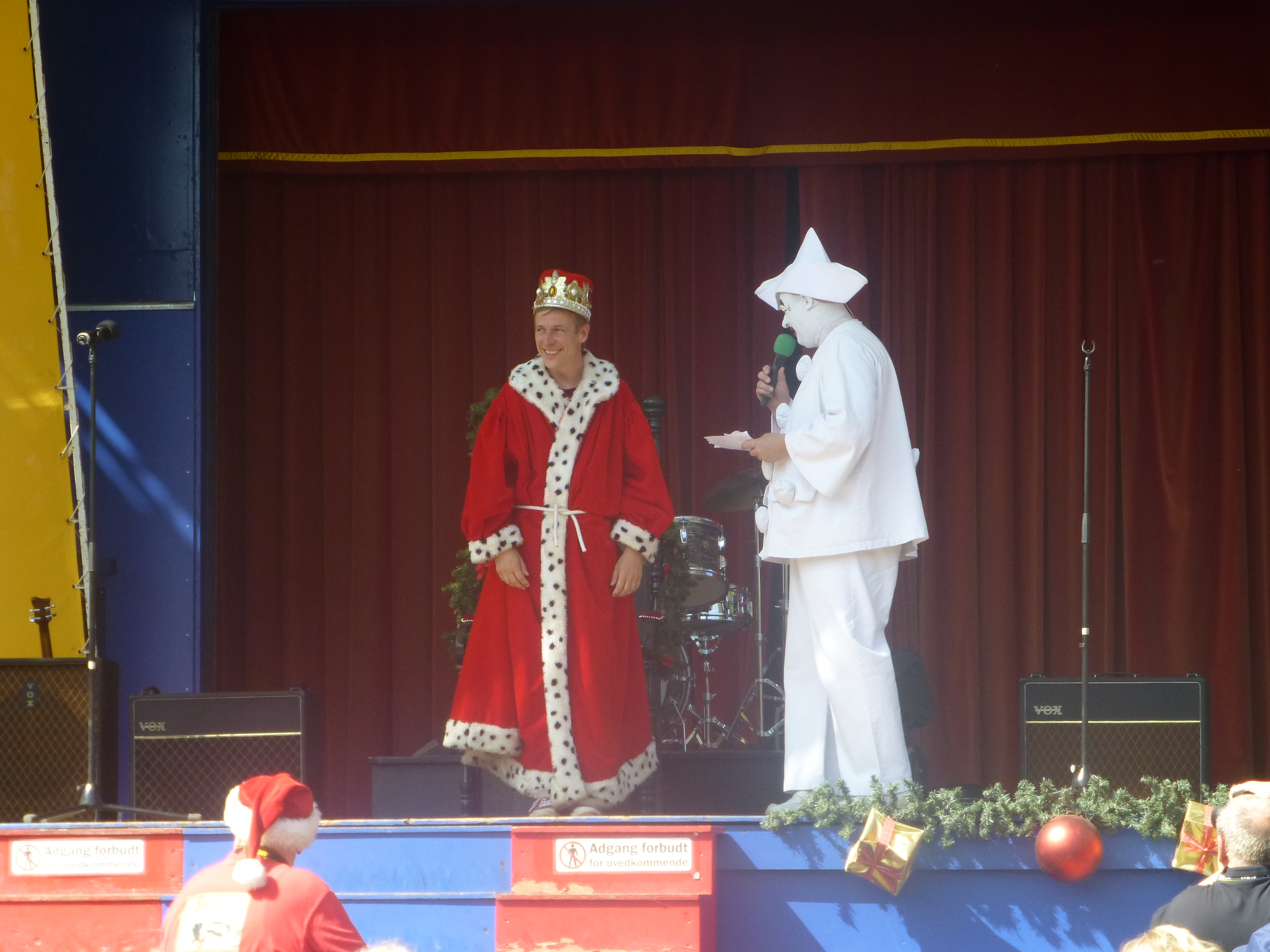
- Jens Blauenfeldt being crowned the honour Santa Claus of the year, at World Santa Claus Congress, c.2013
- Born: 16 January 1968 (age 58); Copenhagen, Denmark

Jens Blauenfeldt (born 16 January 1968 in Copenhagen) is a television actor as well as a screenwriter and director for Denmark's national broadcasting channel Danmarks Radio (DR). He currently hosts the program Kender du typen?, which can be roughly translated into English as Recognize the type? It has run for four seasons with thirty-seven episodes, twenty-three starring himself. He also wrote episodes for the Danish version of Big Brother.

== Controversy ==
On the sixth anniversary of the World Trade Center attacks, Blauenfeldt stated on the Danish television program Aftenshowet or The Evening Show:

I'm a bit embarrassed to admit this, but my initial thoughts were-- "Hey? It’s the
Americans! Now, they're getting spanked. This serves them right!"

One of his co-hosts asked, "Did you really think that?" He replied:

Yes, I'm not even lying and I'm a bit embarrassed to admit it. But it was like--
"Finally, someone is striking back!”

The network did not rebroadcast the program as planned. Lisbet Lambert, DR's news division head, said Blauenfeldt violated employee rules and regulations. Blauenfeldt has responded that he regrets his statement and considers himself "utterly not anti-American".

Blauenfeld later gained fame, by claiming that the radioshow De sorte spejdere had unlawfully used the sound of his laughter. A claim the hosts admitted to and apologized for by playing the recording, which was revealed to be the sound of a man vomiting, on the air.

== See also ==
- September 11, 2001 Attacks
- Anti-Americanism
