= Edyta Herbuś =

Polish dancer, model, and actress (born 1981)

External media
- Edyta Herbuś

Images
- Beauty Expert 2013 (E. Herbuś at a gala ceremony hosted by the Amber Room Restaurant in Warsaw)
- Edyta Herbuś at Łukasz Jemioł’s fashion show (2013)
- Viva Photo Awards 2013

Video
- An episode from a Russian film featuring Edyta Herbuś (Volf Messing: seeing through time)

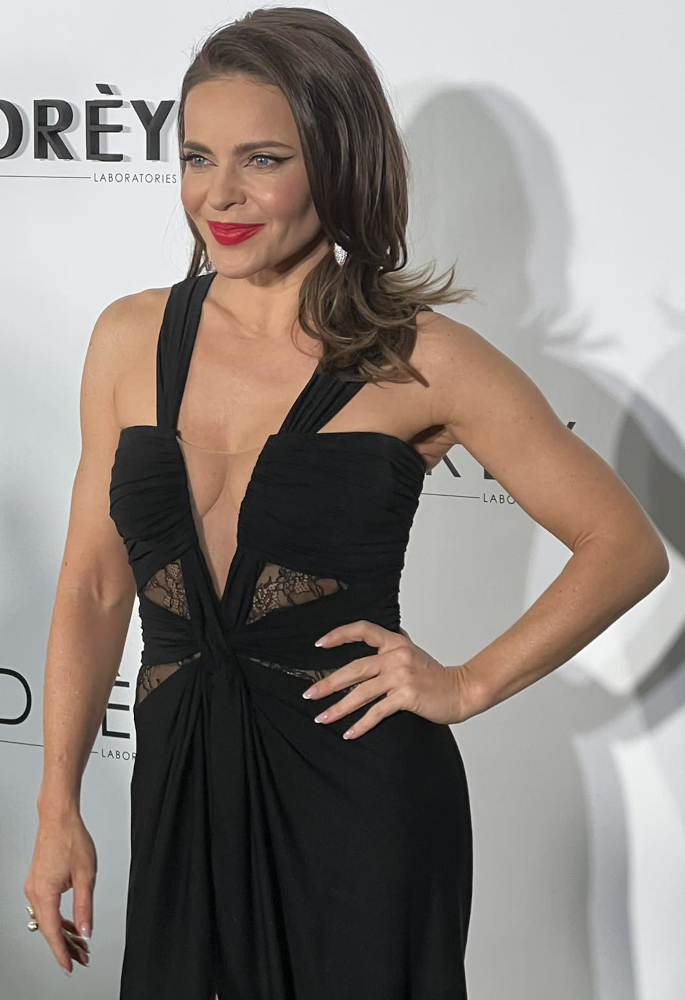
Edyta Herbuś in 2025

Edyta Herbuś (Polish pronunciation: [ɛˈdɨta ˈxɛrbuɕ]; born 26 February 1981) is a Polish dancer, model, and actress. Edyta was the winner of the Eurovision Dance Contest 2008 with partner Marcin Mroczek representing Poland.

== Biography ==
Born in Kielce, Poland, Edyta has a degree in characterization with theatre and movie make up. She attended the dance school Step by Step in Kielce. She took part in the second and fourth Polish edition of Dancing with the Stars. In the second edition, she danced with Jakub Wesołowski, in the fourth with Marcin Mroczek – twice she and her partner ranked third. In Otwock she has a Dance School together with Tomek Barański. In 2007, she took part in Jak oni śpiewają (How They Sing), in which she placed fourth. In a Polish daily soap Na wspólnej she played the role of Urszula. She also starred in Tylko miłość. In Latin American dancing she has the category S class in which she has won many awards. In Poland she was first vicemiss of Miss Hawaiian Tropic 2004, in Las Vegas was Talent Miss.

== Eurovision dance ==
She also appeared on the Eurovision Dance Contest 2008 which she won on September 6 for Poland, giving the country its first ever win in an EBU produced contest.

== Filmography ==
- Volf Messing: Seeing through Time (a Russian TV series) (2009)
- Małgosia kontra Małgosia as Małgosia (2008)
- Świat według Kiepskich as reporter (2007)
- Tylko miłość as Zuzanna Karaś (2007)
- Na Wspólnej as Urszula (2006–2007)
- Kryminalni as waitress and prostitute (2004 and 2007)
- Plebania (2003)

== Dubbing ==
- 7 krasnoludków: Las to za mało - historia jeszcze prawdziwsza – Snow White (2007)
- Wyspa dinozaura – Frania (2006)

== Her programs ==
- Przebojowe dzieci
- W rytmie MTV

== Programs she took part in ==
- Dancing with the Stars (Polish)
- Jak oni śpiewają?
- Dzień Kangura
