= Maria Malanowicz-Niedzielska =

Polish actress (1899–1943)

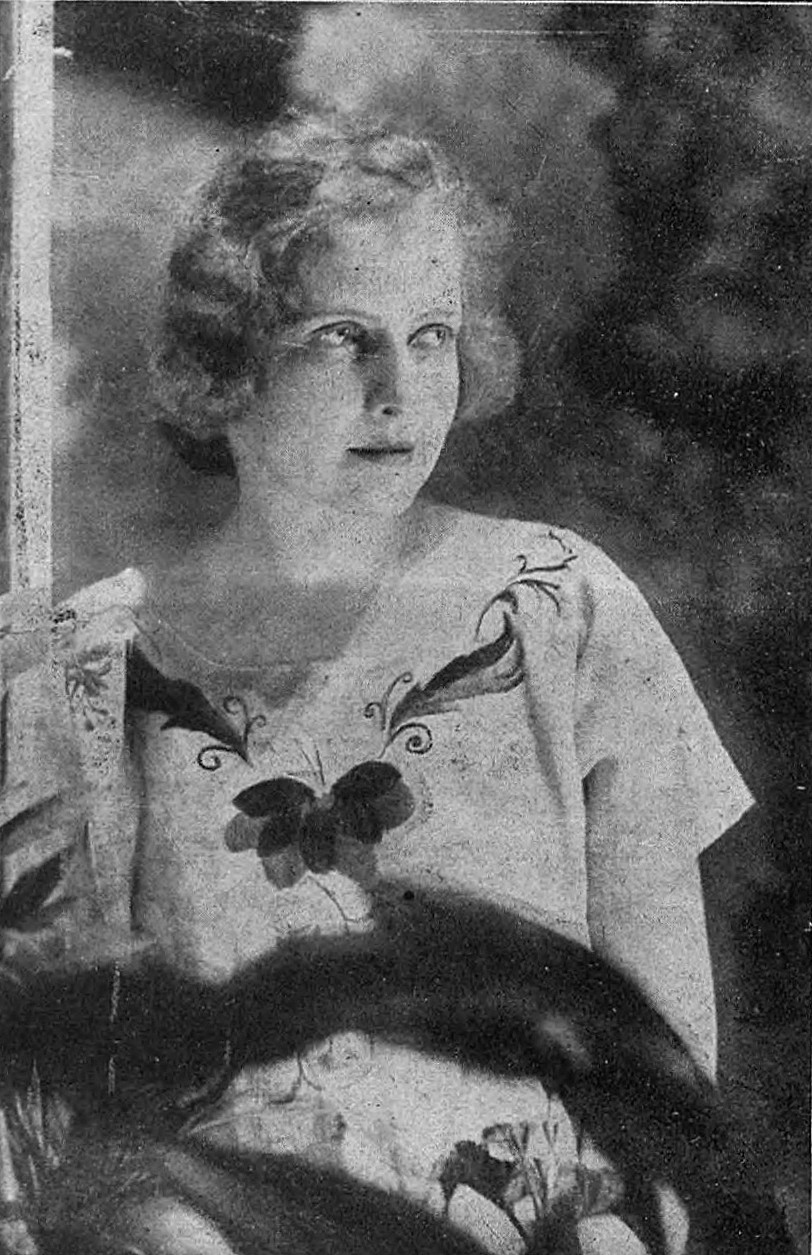
- Born: Maria Malanowicz; 30 November 1899; Vilnius, Russian Empire
- Died: 8 October 1943 (aged 43); Warsaw, German-occupied Poland
- Occupation: Actress
- Years active: 1919–1939

Maria Malanowicz-Niedzielska (30 November 1899 – 8 October 1943) was a Polish actress. She was active in theatre and film between 1919 and 1939. A counter-intelligence agent for the Home Army during the Second World War, she was shot and killed during a Home Army action in October 1943.

== Select filmography ==
- Geniusz sceny (1939)
