= Leontyna Halpertowa =

Polish actress and translator (1803–1895)

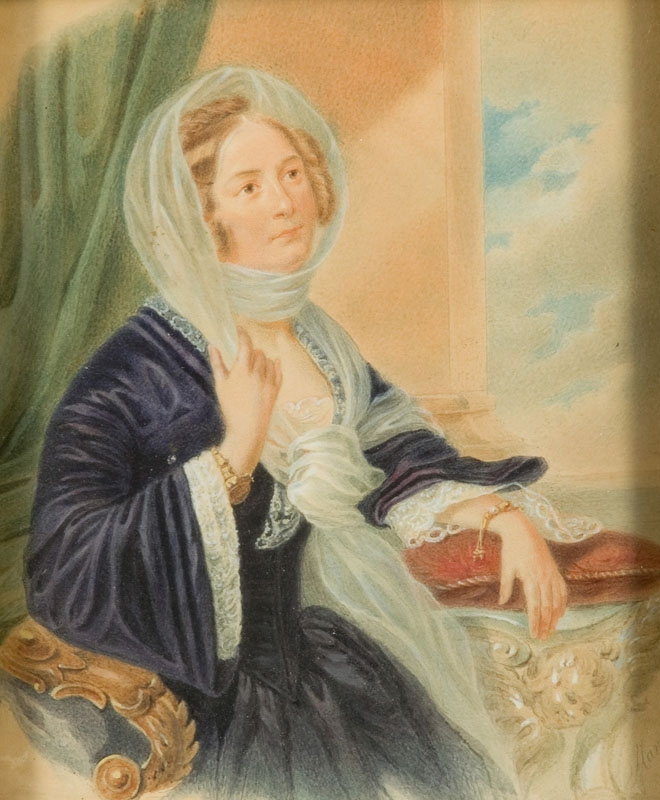
- Portrait by Stanisław Marszałkiewicz
- Born: Eleonora Żuczkowska; 14 April 1803; Puławy, Lublin Department, Duchy of Warsaw
- Died: 19 March 1895 (aged 91); Warsaw, Warsaw Governorate, Congress Poland
- Occupations: Actress; translator

Leontyna Halpertowa (née Eleonora Żuczkowska; 14 April 1803 – 19 March 1895) was a Polish stage actress and translator. She was one of the most famous Polish actors of her time.

== Life ==
Leontyna Halpertowa debuted on the Warsaw stage in 1821. With Bonawentura Kudlicz she toured Płock, Poznań, and Kalisz. In 1824–51 she was active in Warsaw theaters and taught at the Warsaw Drama School. She was one of the most famous Polish actors of the day, and was described as talented and beautiful; she was considered an artist of immense talent and gained the most outstanding reputation in Poland. She played both comic and tragic roles, and was admired for her recitation. She was regarded an ideal of beauty.

She introduced a reform of Polish theatrical diction in the direction of simplicity.

She is also known for translating to the Polish theater plays from the French language.

== Roles ==
- Sabina in Pierre Corneille's Horace;
- Cecilia in Józef Korzeniowski's Miss Married;
- Mirandolina in Carlo Goldoni's Mirandolina;
- Rita in Jules Chabot de Bouin and Charles Desnoyer's Rita l'espagnole;
- Elvira in Aleksander Fredro's Man and Wife;
- Wiardy in Aleksander Wolf's Precjoza;
- Phaedra in Jean Racine's Phèdre;
- Chimène in Pierre Corneille's Le Cid;
- Joan of Arc in Friedrich Schiller's The Maid of Orleans;
- Hermione in Jean Racine's Andromaque;
- Barbara Radziwiłł in Alojzy Feliński's Barbara Radziwiłłówna.

== See also ==
- List of Poles
