= Peter J. Lucas =

Polish actor

Piotr Andrzejewski
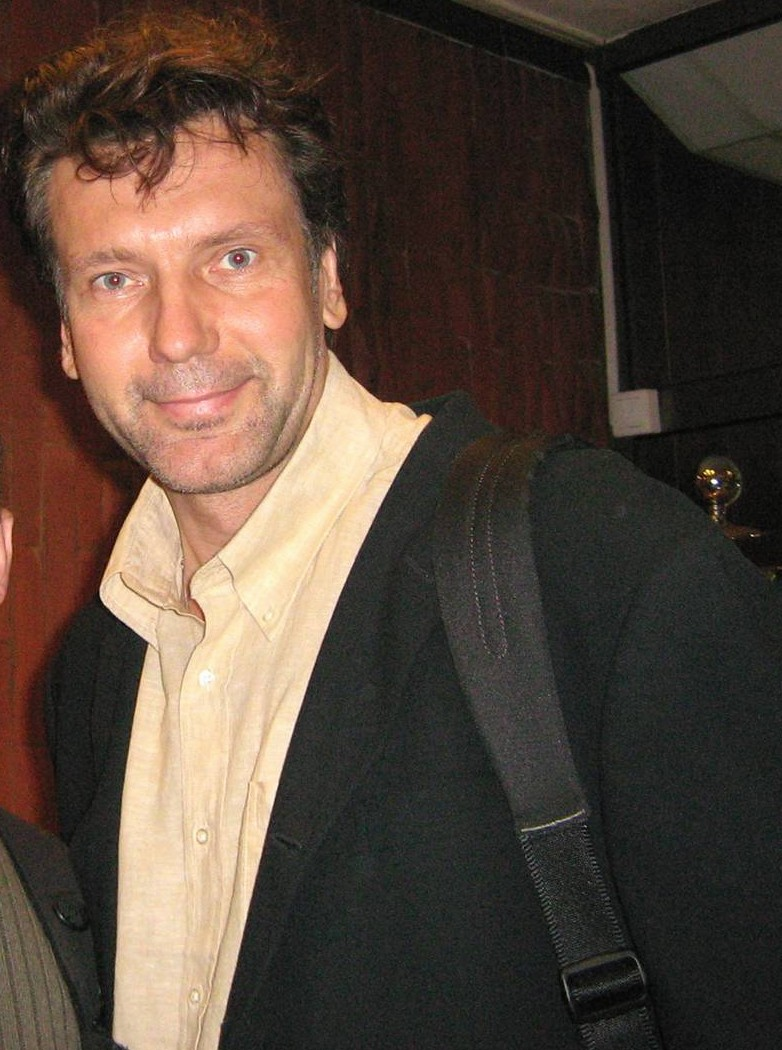
- Peter J. Lucas
- Born: 2 June 1962 (age 63); Września, Poland

Piotr Józef Andrzejewski (born 2 June 1962), known professionally as Peter J. Lucas, is a Polish and American actor.

In 2006 he participated in Taniec z gwiazdami.

== Filmography ==
=== Film ===
- 1996: Independence Day as a Russian reporter
- 1996: Dangerous Cargo as Alexei
- 1997: Too Good to Be True as Jack
- 1997: Mala Sangre (Short) as Martin
- 1999: Kiler-ów 2-óch as Szakal
- 2000: Ostatnia misja as Andrzej "Andre" Kostynowicz
- 2001: Heart of Stone as Ken Sanders
- 2003: Cradle 2 the Grave as a Russian customer
- 2005: The Island as driver
- 2006: Inland Empire as Piotrek Król
- 2006: Miriam as Bijaikis
- 2007: The Perfect Sleep as Ivan
- 2011: Wygrany as Maurice Boisset
- 2019: Lukasiewicz - nafciarz romantyk as John D. Rockefeller

==== TV Movie ====
- 1997: Into Thin Air: Death on Everest as Anatoli Boukreev
- 2002: Hunter: Return to Justice as Vladimir Koskov

=== TV Series ===
- 1996: Walker Texas Ranger as Max Karpov
- 1998: Baywatch as Mike Donovan
- 1998-2001: Seven Days as Karl Pretzneff / Josef Pretzneff
- 1998-2002: V.I.P. as General Kolya Trofimov
- 2001: JAG as Russian First Officer
- 2003: ER as a Geologist
- 2006: Oficerowie as Lieutenant Colonel Jakus Mond
- 2007: Samo życie as Jacek Stępiński, Łukasz Dunin's father
- 2009: 39 i pół as Karol, former Kaśka's husband
- 2009: Burn Notice as Pyotr Chechik
- 2011: Nikita as Sergei Semak

== Video games ==
- 1995: Gabriel Knight 2: The Beast Within as Baron Friedrich Von Glower
