= Jeremi Przybora =

Polish poet, writer, actor and singer

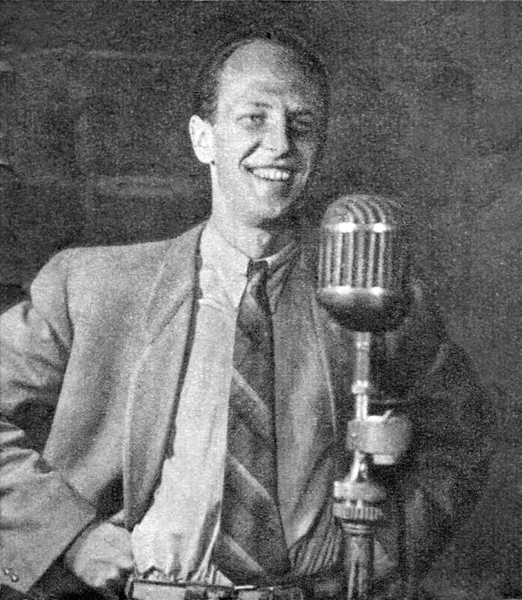

Jeremi Przybora (12 December 1915 in Warsaw – 4 March 2004) was a Polish poet, writer, actor and singer. He created the TV-series "Kabaret Starszych Panów" (Elderly Gentlemen's Cabaret) with Jerzy Wasowski and performed ballads and sung poetry, a popular music genre in Poland.

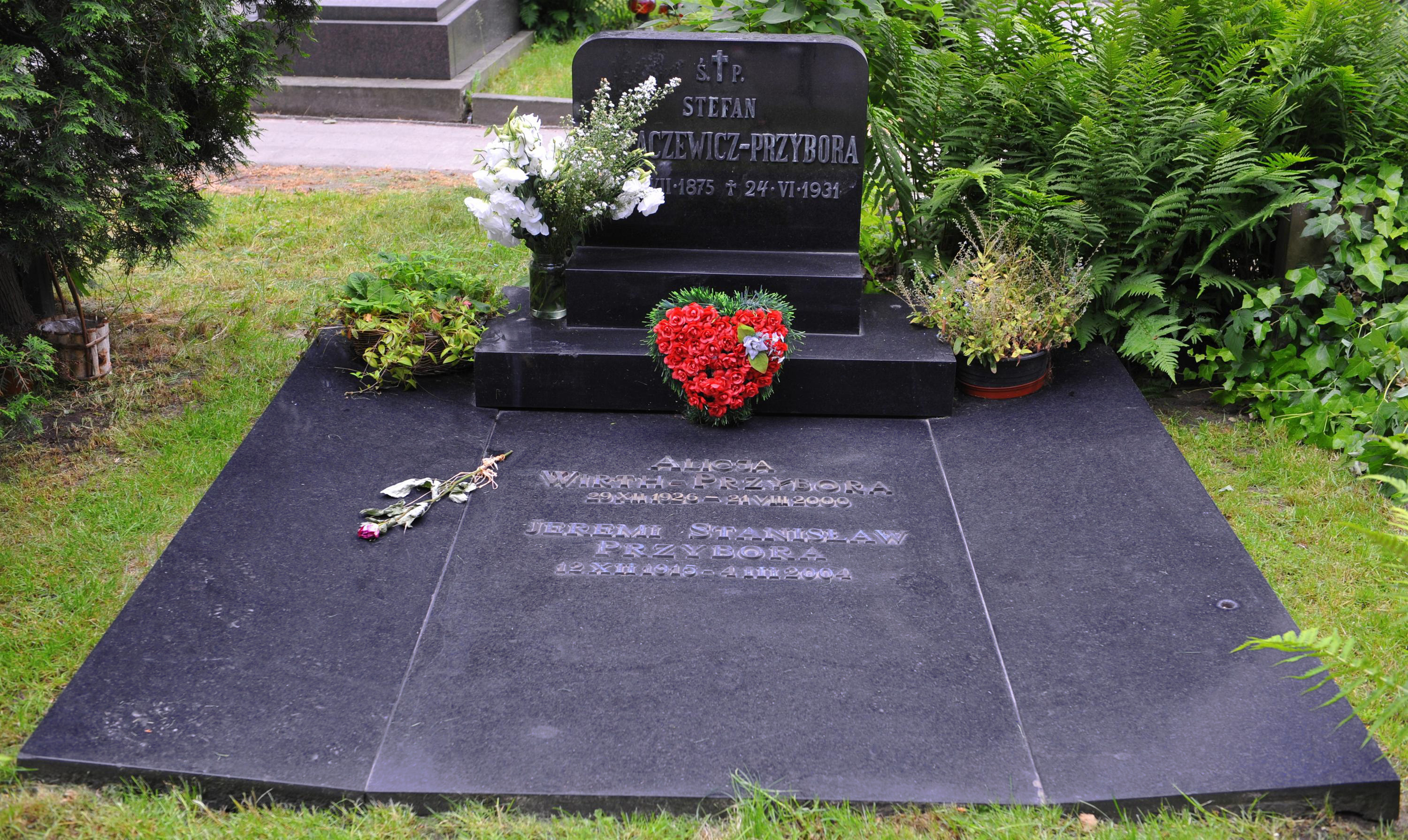
Przybora's grave at the Calvinist Cemetery in Warsaw
