= Jerzy Wasowski =

Polish engineer, radio announcer, musician, actor and director

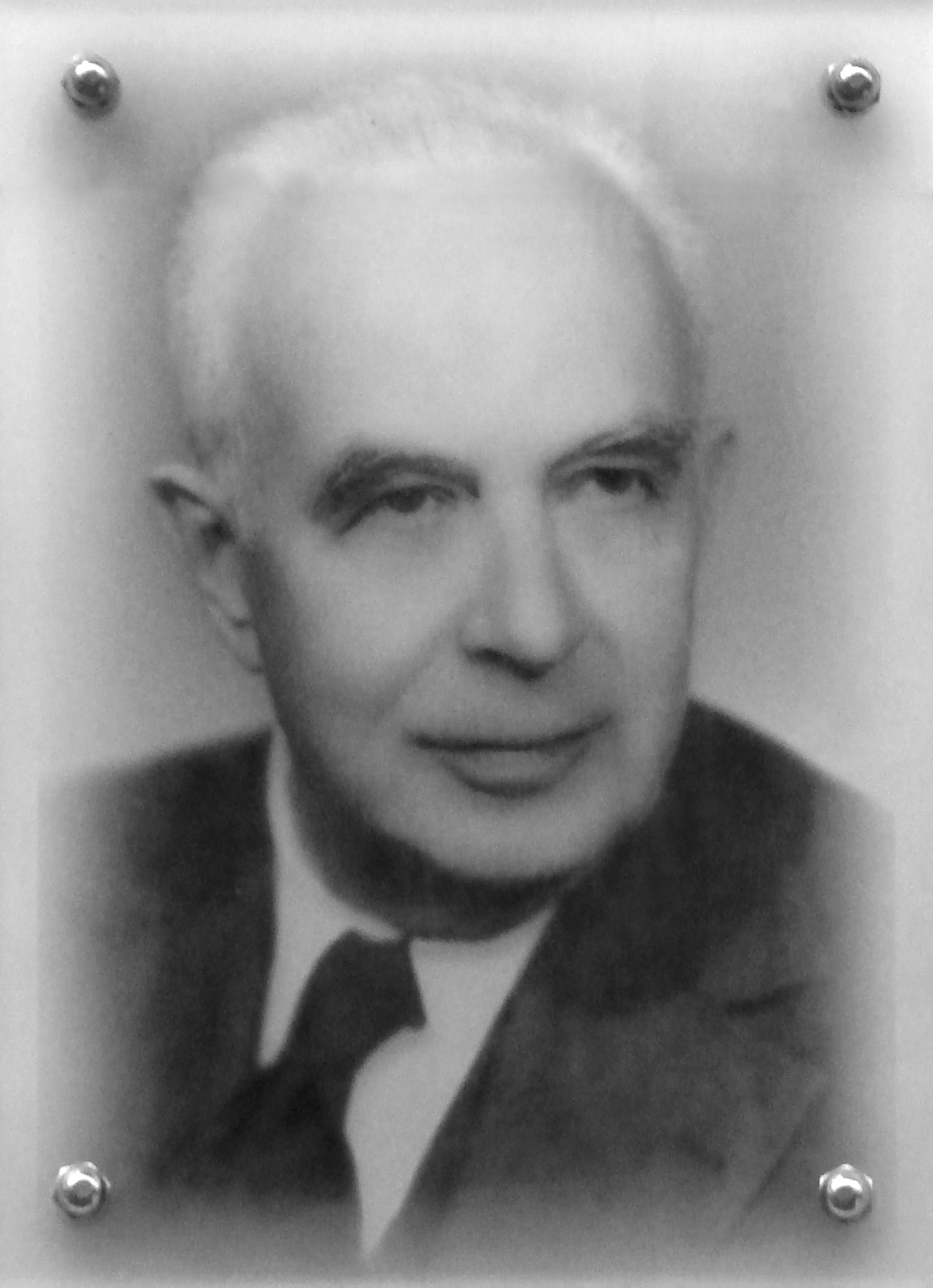

Jerzy Ryszard Wasowski (31 May 1913 – 29 September 1984) was a Polish acoustics engineer, radio announcer, composer, pianist, actor and director. He was the son of Józef Wasowski and the husband of Maria Wasowska and the father of Grzegorz Wasowski. Together with Jeremi Przybora he created Kabaret Starszych Panów (Old Gentlemen's Cabaret).

He created about 700 songs altogether, including around 100 songs for children. He also composed 150 musical illustrations for radio dramas, television shows, cartoons and feature films, and theatre plays.

== Biography ==
Jerzy Wasowski was born on 31 May 1913 in Warsaw. Having graduated from the Warsaw University of Technology, he started his professional training in the Polish Radio.

In 1938, he met Jeremi Przybora. After the war, in 1945-46, he worked in the Polish Radio as a radio announcer and also worked in the technical department. Later, in 1946-1948 he worked in Miejskie Teatry Dramatyczne in Warsaw as an actor and a composer.

He cooperated with the Polish Radio as the director of the departments of music and of recordings, as an acoustic director, a director of Teatr Humoru i Satyry (Theatre of Humour and Satire).

He was a self-taught musician. He wrote in the tonal system.
