= Outline of dance =

Art form consisting of movement of the body

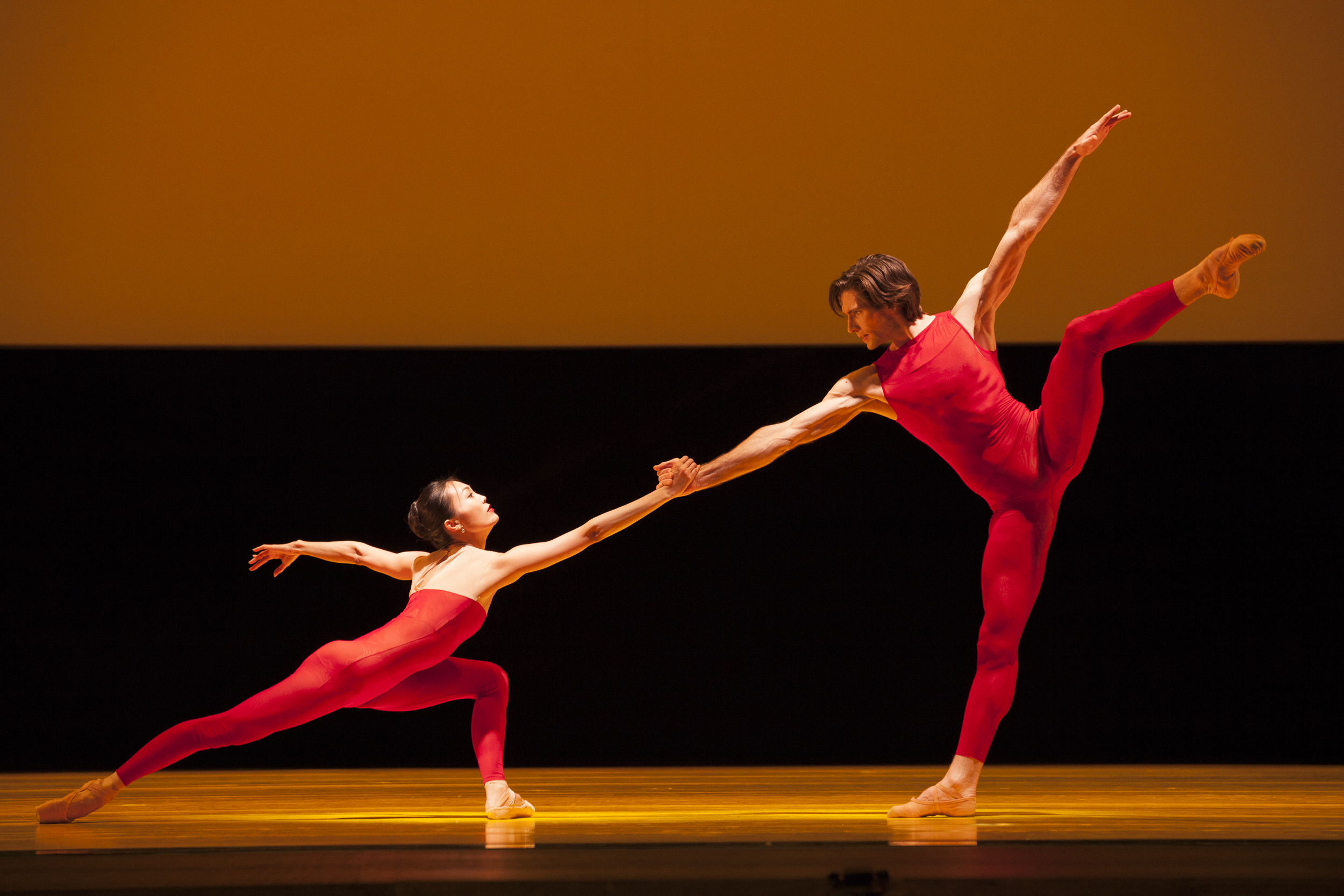
Ballet dancers Yuka Ebihara and Vladimir Yaroshenko in Bolero (2016).

The following outline is provided as an overview of and topical guide to dance:

Dance – human movement either used as a form of expression or presented in a social, spiritual or performance setting. Choreography is the art of making dances, and the person who does this is called a choreographer. Definitions of what constitutes dance are dependent on social, cultural, aesthetic, artistic and moral constraints and range from functional movement (such as Folk dance) to codified, virtuoso techniques such as ballet. A great many dances and dance styles are performed to dance music.

== Description ==
Dance (also called "dancing") can fit the following categories:

- an activity or behavior
  - one of the arts – a creative endeavor or discipline.
    - one of the performing arts.
  - Hobby – regular activity or interest that is undertaken for pleasure, typically done during one's leisure time.
  - Exercise – bodily activity that enhances or maintains physical fitness and overall health and wellness.
  - Sport—bodily activity that displays physical exertion
  - Recreation – leisure time activity
  - Ritual

Some other things can be named "dance" metaphorically; see dance (disambiguation)

== Types of dance ==
Type of dance – a particular dance or dance style. There are many varieties of dance. Dance categories are not mutually exclusive. For example, tango is traditionally a partner dance. While it is mostly social dance, its ballroom form may be competitive dance, as in DanceSport. At the same time it is enjoyed as performance dance, whereby it may well be a solo dance.

- List of dances
  - List of dance style categories
  - List of ethnic, regional, and folk dances by origin
  - List of folk dances sorted by origin
  - List of national dances
  - List of DanceSport dances

=== Dance genres ===
- Acro dance
- B-boying
- Ballet
- Bollywood dance
- Ballroom dance
- Baroque dance
- Belly dance
  - Glossary of belly dance terms
- Bharatanatyam
- Casino (Cuban salsa)
- Cha-cha-cha
- Chicago stepping
- Circle dance
- Competitive dance
  - Dance squad
- Contemporary dance
- Contra dance
- Country-western dance
- Disco
  - Hustle
- Erotic dancing
- Fandango
- Flamenco
- Folk dance
- Hip-hop dance
- Indian classical dance
- Jazz dance
- Jig
- Jive
- Krumping
- Lambada
- Lap dance
- Limbo
- Line dance
- Mambo
- Modern dance
- Pole dance
- Polka
- Quickstep
- Salsa
- Sequence dance
- Street dance
- Swing
- Tango
- Tap dance
- Twist
- Two-step
- Thai classical dance
- Waltz
- War dance
- Zamba

=== Dance styles by number of interacting dancers ===
- Solo dance – a dance danced by an individual dancing alone.
- Partner dance – dance with just 2 dancers, dancing together. In most partner dances, one, typically a man, is the leader; the other, typically a woman, is the follower. As a rule, they maintain connection with each other. In some dances the connection is loose and called dance handhold. In other dances the connection involves body contact.
  - Glossary of partner dance terms
- Group dance – dance danced by a group of people simultaneously. Group dances are generally, but not always, coordinated or standardized in such a way that all the individuals in the group are dancing the same steps at the same time. Alternatively, various groups within the larger group may be dancing different, but complementary, parts of the larger dance.

=== Dance styles by main purpose ===
- Competitive dance –
- Erotic dance –
- Participation dance –
- Performance dance –
- Social dance –
- Concert dance –

== Geography of dance (by region) ==
Africa

West Africa

Benin • Burkina Faso • Cape Verde • Côte d'Ivoire • Gambia • Ghana • Guinea • Guinea-Bissau • Liberia • Mali • Mauritania • Niger • Nigeria • Senegal • Sierra Leone • Togo

North Africa

Algeria • Egypt (Ancient Egypt) • Libya • Mauritania • Morocco • Sudan • South Sudan •Tunisia • Western Sahara

Central Africa

Angola • Burundi • Cameroon • Central African Republic • Chad • The Democratic Republic of the Congo • Equatorial Guinea • Gabon • Republic of the Congo • Rwanda • São Tomé and Príncipe

East Africa

Burundi • Comoros • Djibouti • Eritrea • Ethiopia • Kenya • Madagascar • Malawi • Mauritius • Mozambique • Rwanda • Seychelles • Somalia • Tanzania • Uganda • Zambia • Zimbabwe

Southern Africa

Botswana • Eswatini • Lesotho • Namibia • South Africa

Dependencies

Mayotte (France) • St. Helena (UK) • Puntland • Somaliland • Sahrawi Arab Democratic Republic

Antarctica

None

Asia

Central Asia

Kazakhstan • Kyrgyzstan • Tajikistan • Turkmenistan • Uzbekistan

East Asia

China

Tibet

Hong Kong • Macau

Japan • North Korea • South Korea • Mongolia • Taiwan

North Asia

Russia

Southeast Asia

Brunei • Burma (Myanmar) • Cambodia • East Timor (Timor-Leste) • Indonesia • Laos • Malaysia • Philippines • Singapore • Thailand • Vietnam

South Asia

Afghanistan • Bangladesh • Bhutan • Iran • Maldives • Nepal • Pakistan • Sri Lanka

India

West Asia

Armenia • Azerbaijan • Bahrain • Cyprus (including disputed Northern Cyprus) • Georgia • Iraq • Israel • Jordan • Kuwait • Lebanon • Oman • Palestinian territories Qatar • Saudi Arabia • Syria • Turkey • United Arab Emirates • Yemen

Caucasus (a region considered to be in both Asia and Europe, or between them)

North Caucasus

Parts of Russia (Chechnya, Ingushetia, Dagestan, Adyghea, Kabardino-Balkaria, Karachai-Cherkessia, North Ossetia, Krasnodar Krai, Stavropol Krai)

South Caucasus

Georgia (including disputed Abkhazia, South Ossetia) • Armenia • Azerbaijan (including disputed Nagorno-Karabakh Republic)

Europe

Akrotiri and Dhekelia • Åland • Albania • Andorra • Armenia • Austria • Azerbaijan • Belarus • Belgium • Bosnia and Herzegovina • Bulgaria • Croatia • Cyprus • Czech Republic • Denmark • Estonia • Faroe Islands • Finland • France • Georgia • Germany • Gibraltar • Greece • Guernsey • Hungary • Iceland • Ireland • Isle of Man • Italy • Jersey • Kazakhstan • Kosovo • Latvia • Liechtenstein • Lithuania • Luxembourg • Macedonia • Malta • Moldova (including disputed Transnistria) • Monaco • Montenegro • Netherlands • Poland • Portugal • Romania • Russia • San Marino • Serbia • Slovakia • Slovenia •
Norway

Svalbard

Spain

Autonomous communities of Spain: Catalonia

Sweden • Switzerland • Turkey • Ukraine
United Kingdom

England • Northern Ireland • Scotland • Wales

Vatican City

European Union

North America

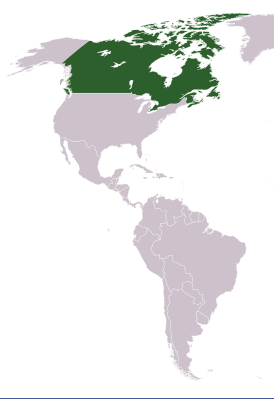
Canada

Provinces of Canada: • Alberta • British Columbia • Manitoba • New Brunswick • Newfoundland and Labrador • Nova Scotia • Ontario (Toronto) • Prince Edward Island • Quebec • Saskatchewan
Territories of Canada: Northwest Territories • Nunavut • Yukon

Greenland • Saint Pierre and Miquelon

United States

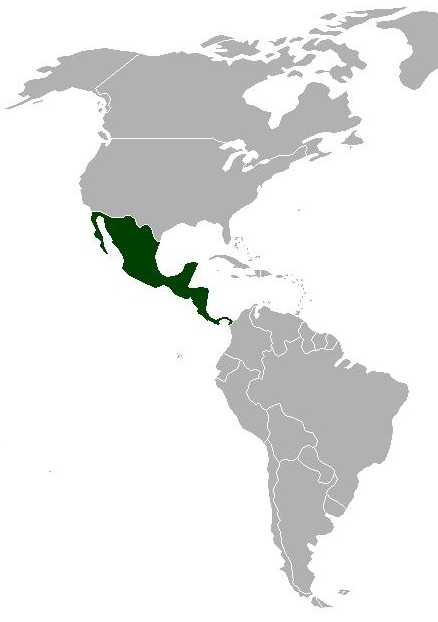
Mexico

Central America

Belize • Costa Rica • El Salvador • Guatemala • Honduras • Nicaragua • Panama

Caribbean

Anguilla • Antigua and Barbuda • Aruba • Bahamas • Barbados • Bermuda • British Virgin Islands • Cayman Islands • Cuba • Dominica • Dominican Republic • Grenada • Haiti • Jamaica • Montserrat • Netherlands Antilles • Puerto Rico • Saint Barthélemy • Saint Kitts and Nevis • Saint Lucia • Saint Martin • Saint Vincent and the Grenadines • Trinidad and Tobago • Turks and Caicos Islands • United States Virgin Islands

Oceania (includes the continent of Australia)

Australasia

Australia

Dependencies/Territories of Australia

Christmas Island • Cocos (Keeling) Islands • Norfolk Island

New Zealand

Melanesia

Fiji • Indonesia (Oceanian part only) • New Caledonia (France) • Papua New Guinea • Rotuma • Solomon Islands • Vanuatu

Micronesia

Federated States of Micronesia • Guam (United States) • Kiribati • Marshall Islands • Nauru • Northern Mariana Islands (United States) • Palau • Wake Island (United States)

Polynesia

American Samoa (United States) • Chatham Islands (NZ) • Cook Islands (NZ) • Easter Island (Chile) • French Polynesia (France) • Hawaii (United States) • Loyalty Islands (France) • Niue (NZ) • Pitcairn Islands (UK) • Adamstown • Samoa • Tokelau (NZ) • Tonga • Tuvalu • Wallis and Futuna (France)

South America

Argentina • Bolivia • Brazil • Chile • Colombia • Ecuador • Falkland Islands • Guyana • Paraguay • Peru • Suriname • Uruguay • Venezuela

South Atlantic

Ascension Island • Saint Helena • Tristan da Cunha

== History of dance ==
History of dance

- Dance in ancient Egypt
- Dance in mythology and religion
- Dance styles throughout history
  - Medieval dance
  - Masque
  - English country dance
  - Baroque dance
  - Renaissance dance
  - Regency dance
  - Vintage dance
  - Historical dance
  - Modern dance
  - Contemporary dance

== Dance technique ==
- Choreography
  - Dance notation
- Connection
- Dance moves
  - Glossary of dance moves
- Dance partnering
- Dance theory
- Lead and follow
- Musicality

== Dance culture ==
- Dance and health
- Dance competition
- Dance costume
- Dance critique
- Dance education
  - Dance studio
- Dance etiquette
- Dance in film
  - Dance double
  - Dance film
- Dance marathon
- Dance music
- Dance party
  - Ball (dance party)
  - Prom
  - Rave
- Dance radio
- Dance troupe
- Dance on television
- Nightclub
- Performance
- Performance surface (dance floor)
- Physically integrated dance (disability and dance)
- Women in dance

== Dance science ==
Dance science

- Dance history – (see History of dance, above)
- Dance and health
- Dance theory
- Dance technology
- Ethnochoreology (dance anthropology)

== Dance organizations ==
- List of dance organizations

== Dance-related media ==
- Dance film
- Dance music
- Musical film

=== Books about dance ===
- List of dance wikibooks

== Dancers ==
- List of dancers
- List of dance personalities

== See also ==
- Index of dance articles
- Outline of music
  - Music
  - Musical terminology
- International folk dance
- Quotations about dance
