= Fusion dance =

Contemporary partner dance style

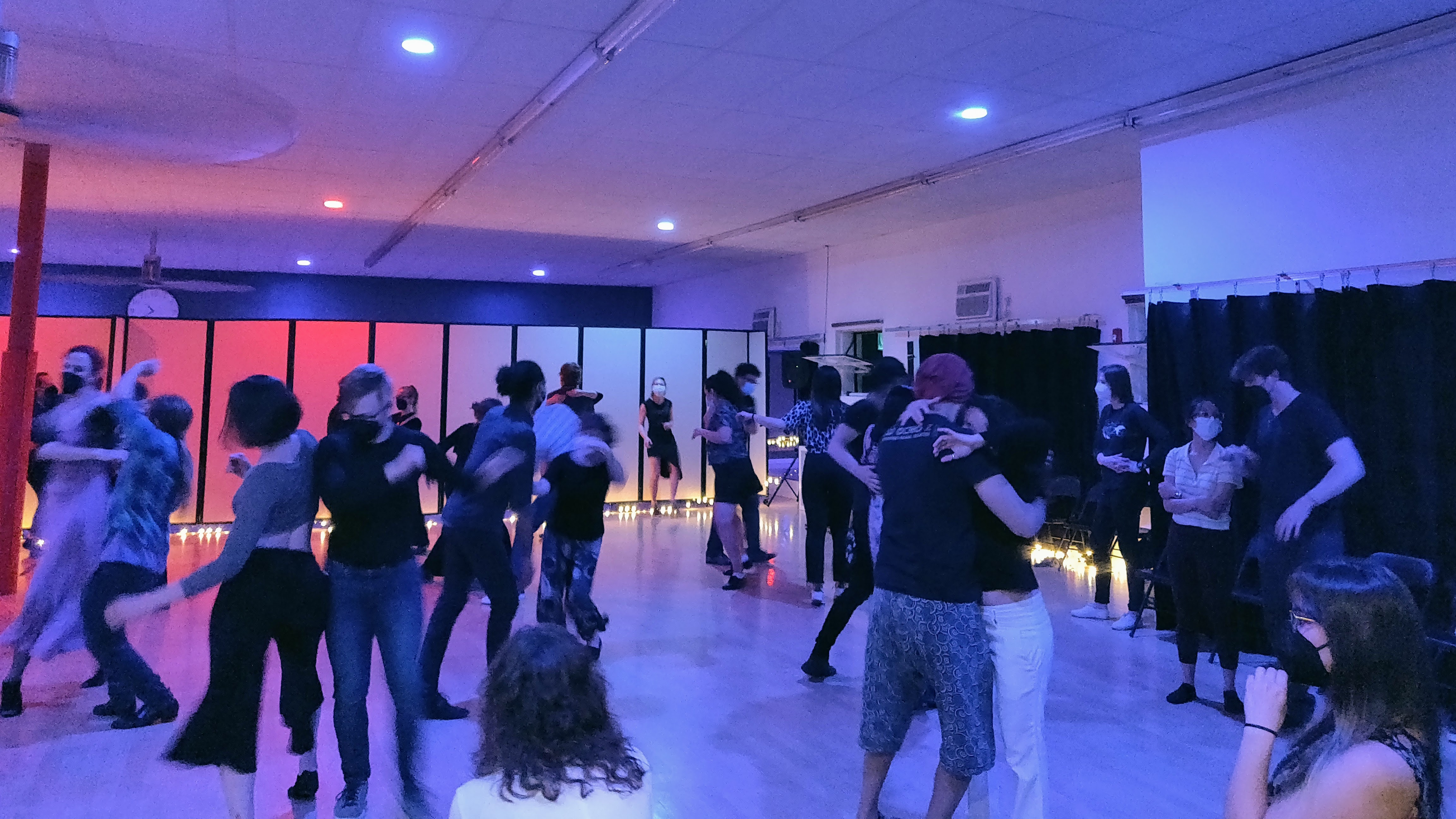
Fusion dance in Cambridge, Massachusetts, U.S.

Fusion dance is a type of contemporary social improvised partner dance that combines different dance styles to create a new aesthetic. It does not require conforming to any particular defined dance styles, but typically uses a lead-follow approach that emphasizes musicality.

It is performed within a community of social dancers that have a variety of views on what it means to Fusion dance, though typically involves creating a new dance style, recreating an already established dance style, combining existing styles of movement, or any combination of the above.

== History ==
The Fusion dance community emerged in the 2000s in the United States, and later spread to Canada, Europe, and other regions (although some think it might have started as early as the 1990s).

The first national event that was officially for Fusion dancers was the Houston Fusion Exchange, January 4-6, 2008. The Fusion Exchange was held in a different city each year for 7 years including, Houston, Portland, San Diego, Boston, San Francisco, Las Vegas, & Denver, and had a huge influence on the growth of Fusion around the US, inspiring many local scenes to start their own monthly or weekly Fusion events across the US.

Another huge influence on Fusion has been the Recess Production events, which started with the Aspen Blues Recess in Colorado, in August 2008 and ran over 60 events between 2008 - 2018, branching out to Europe in 2012.

Another influence was the Tangoed Up In Blues workshops first held on May 20-22, 2005, in San Francisco, played a role in the Fusion community. The purpose of Tangoed Up In Blues was to bring the blues and tango communities together, compare and contrast the two dance styles, explore the tension between new and old in both dances, and provide a fun dancing experience. Its precursor was a Fusion Blues workshop with six blues classes and one tango class in Portland in December 2004, held at Tango Berretín in collaboration with Fusion-PDX.

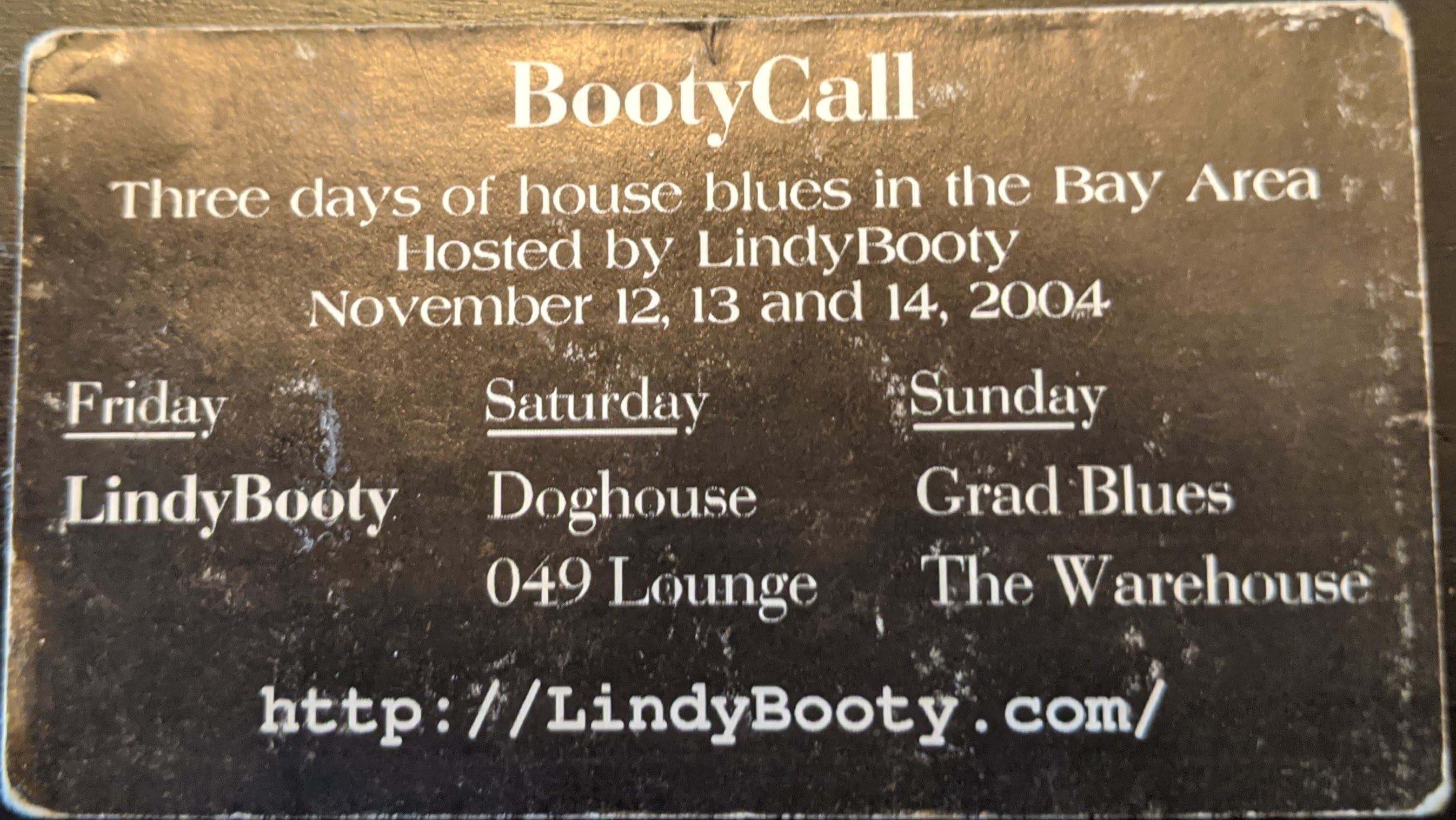
A flyer for Lindy Booty

There were also several events that influenced the Fusion community before the name "Fusion" was used. For example, Lindy Booty, a weekend Lindy Hop event held in both San Francisco and Sacramento in 2004, likely had a strong influence on the growth of Fusion. The event featured a significant amount of non-Lindy Hop music (Blues, Rock 'n' Roll, and a smattering of other styles), encouraging dancers to fuse their Lindy Hop movements with other styles of music. Similar influences probably came from other Lindy Hop events and possibly some non-Lindy Hop events as well.

== Technique ==
Fusion dance may employ any dance technique, or arbitrary combination of techniques, associated with any type of dance. It usually incorporates dance partnering techniques such as connection, extension-compression, and frame, and may also utilise other techniques such as ballet technique, contact improvisation, and popping.

In a typical dance, a lead-follow approach is used in which one partner prompts moves and the other responds to them. To a greater extent than many other dance forms, fusion decouples the dance roles from their historically associated genders. Fusion culture also places significant emphasis on consent between partners.

== Music ==
Fusion dancing emphasises musicality. The music style may influence a fusion dancer's choice of dance style. For example, a dancer might employ popping in response to hip hop music.

== Events ==
Fusion dances are held periodically in many cities across Europe and the United States. Many are organised events open to the public; others are small, private gatherings.

=== Festivals ===
"Fusion festivals" are held at various locations. These are typically three-day events in which various dance styles are taught during the day and social dances are held in the evenings. Some festivals emphasise specific dance styles, such as Argentine tango, slow lindy hop, West Coast Swing, or blues dancing, whereas others encompass all dance styles.
