= Dance partnering =

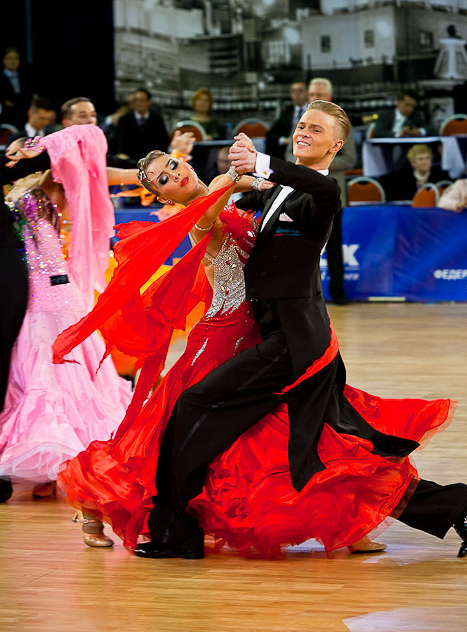
A dancer guides his partner via physical connection, a commonly used technique in partner dances

Dance partnering is dancing performed by two or more dancers (traditionally a male leader and a female follower, though forms such as Contact improvisation and Fusion dance have troubled this traditional dynamic), that strive to achieve a harmony of coordinated movements. Many forms of dance rely on the application of partnering dance techniques that facilitate coordinated movements by dancers. Dance partnering technique appears in various forms in many types of dance and is an essential part of all partner dances. Scholars of dance, including anthropologist Cynthia Novack, philosopher Ilya Vidrin, ethnomusicology David Kaminsky, cognitive scientist Michael Kimmel, among others, have written about techniques of partnering in different forms.

== Technique ==
A variety of partner dance techniques are employed in dance partnering. Typically, the technique used for a particular dance style is generally focused on either communication between partners or physical support of one partner by the other.

=== Guidance ===
In many partner dances (e.g., ballroom dance) the male dancer typically assumes the role of lead and provides guidance to his typically female partner, the follower. This may simply be a matter of guiding his partner to the next fixed position during a set routine, or in free-form dances may include deciding and communicating the sequence of figures to be danced on the fly.

=== Support ===
In a ballet pas de deux, the male dancer may provide support for his partner when she performs balancing feats that would be difficult or impossible without assistance.

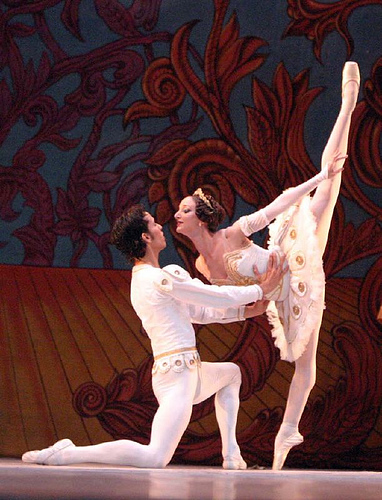

=== Lifts ===
A dance lift is a sequence of acrobatic movements in which one dancer (typically the male) lifts and, in many cases, holds their dance partner above the floor. In some cases (e.g., Rock and Roll dance), the dance partner may actually be propelled into the air. When performing a lift, the lifting dancer typically strives to gracefully and confidently lift, catch and carry their partner. Dance lifts are commonly performed in various types of dance, including acro, ballet, jive and jitterbug.

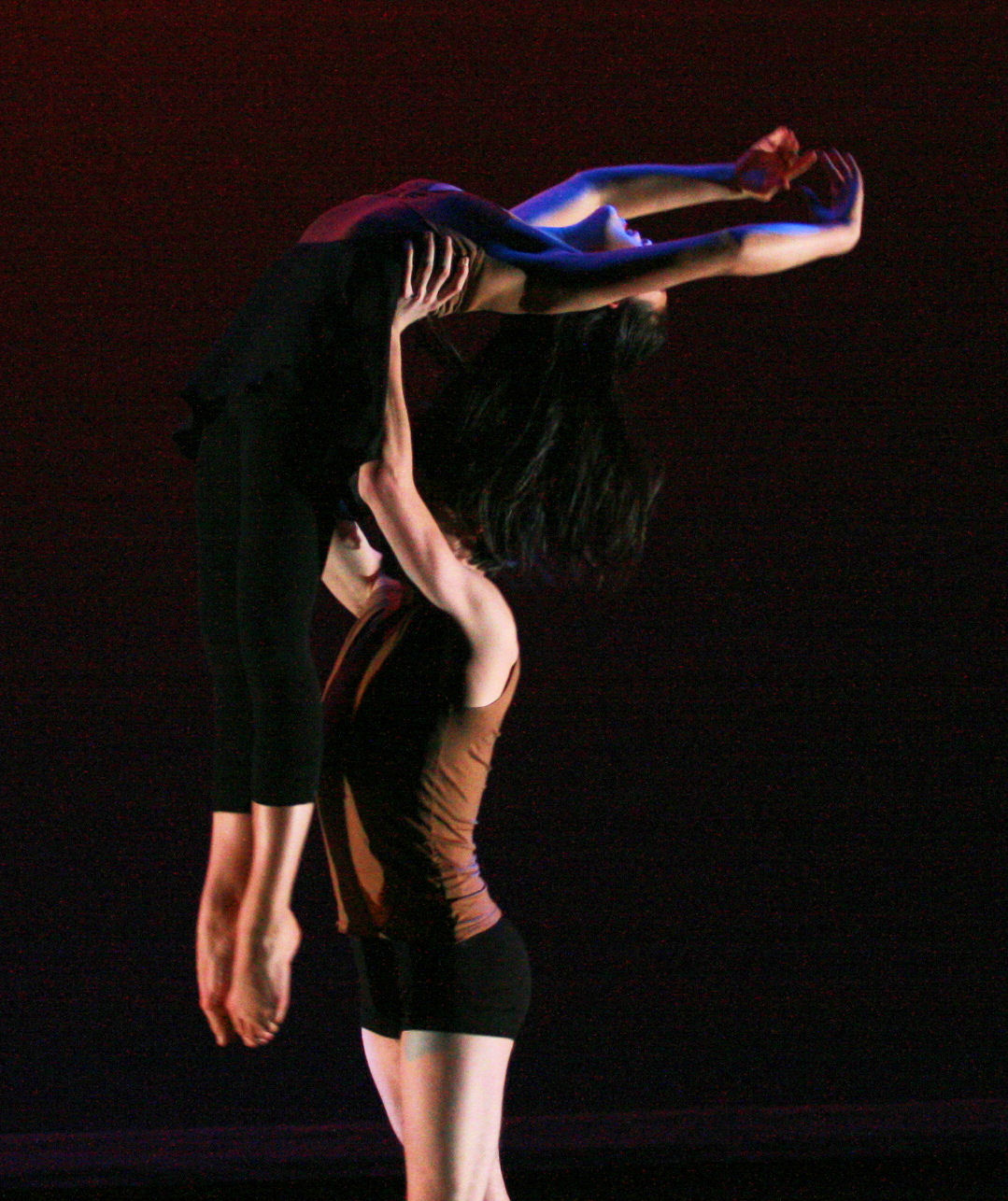

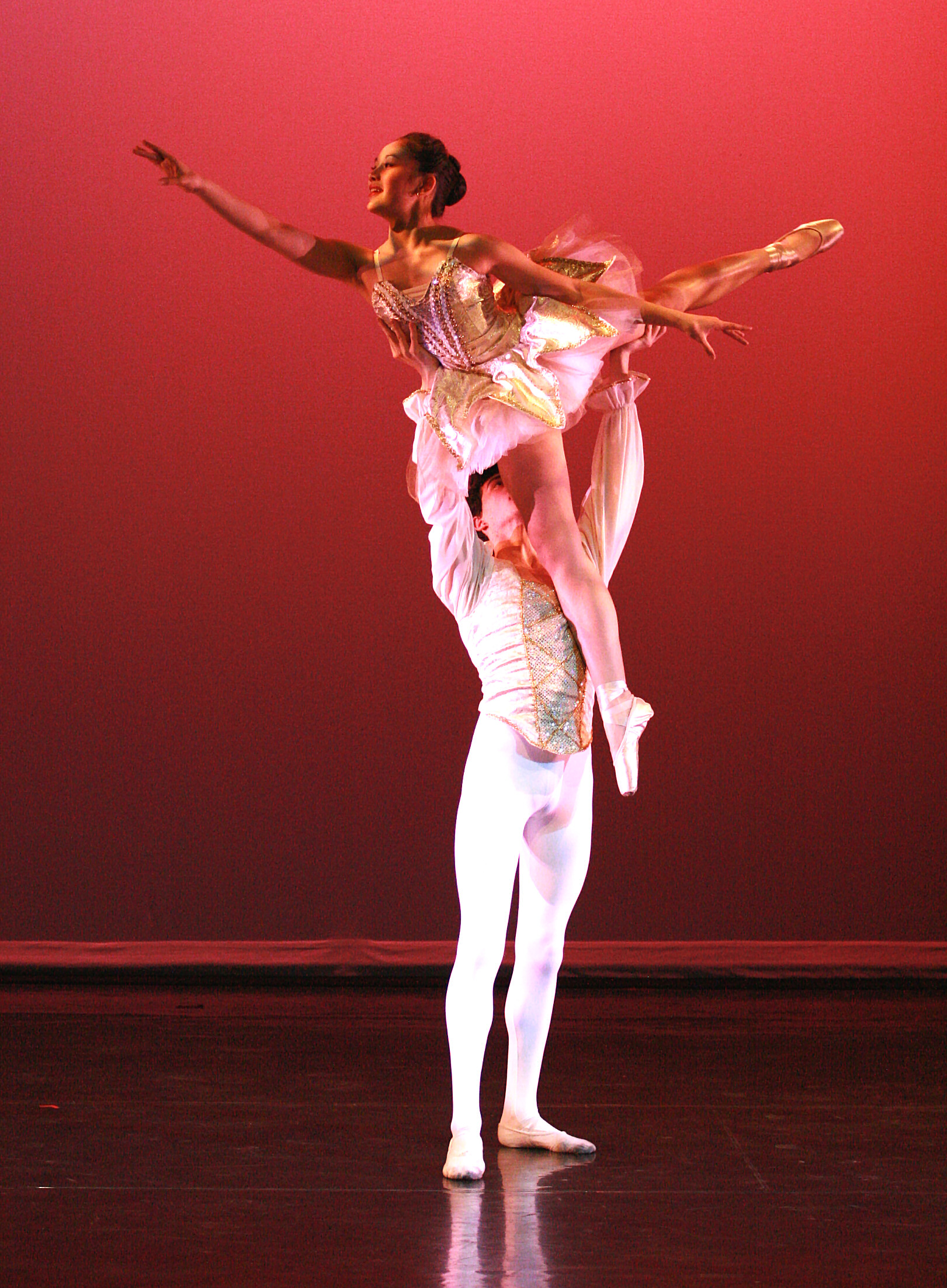

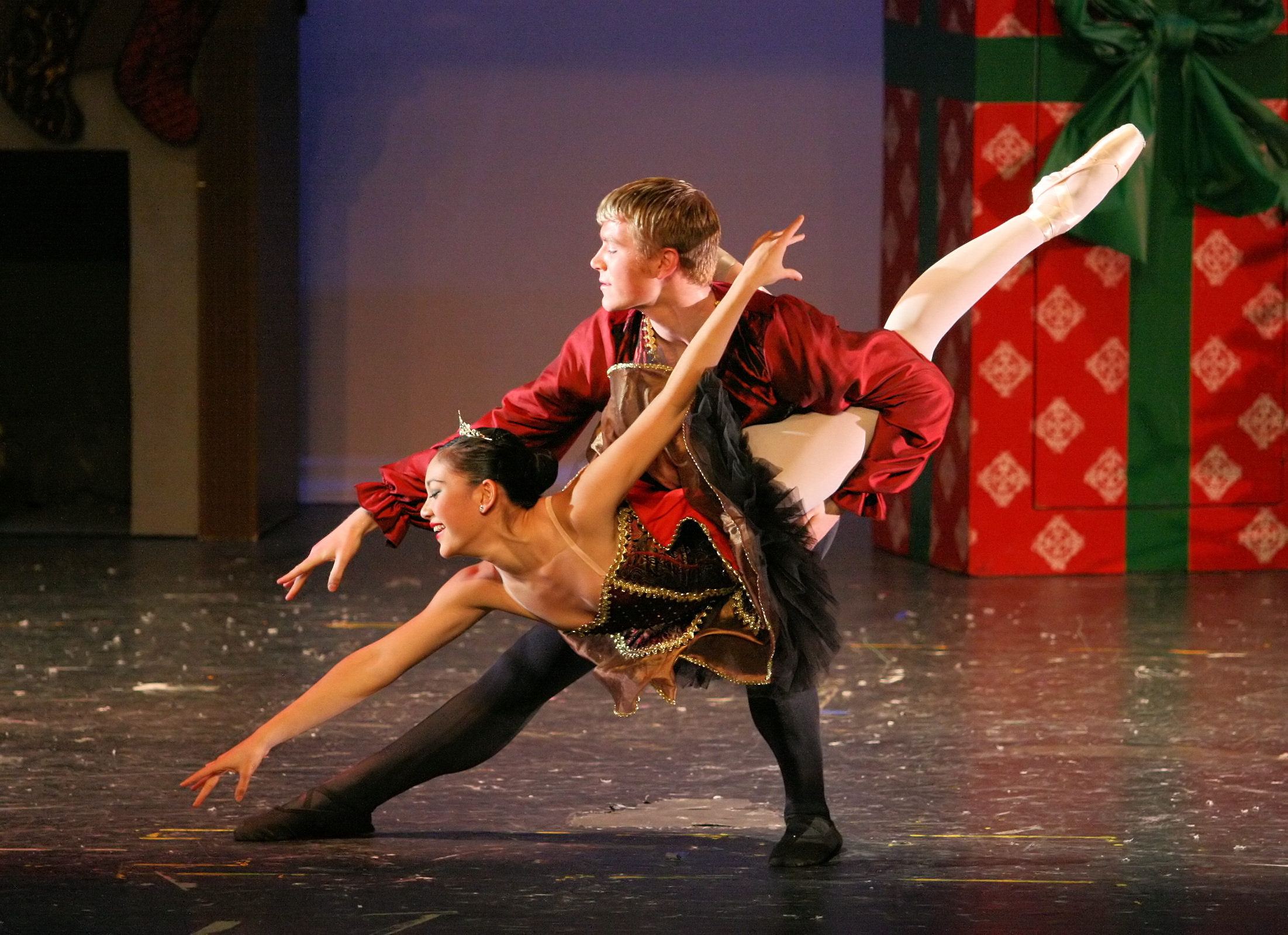

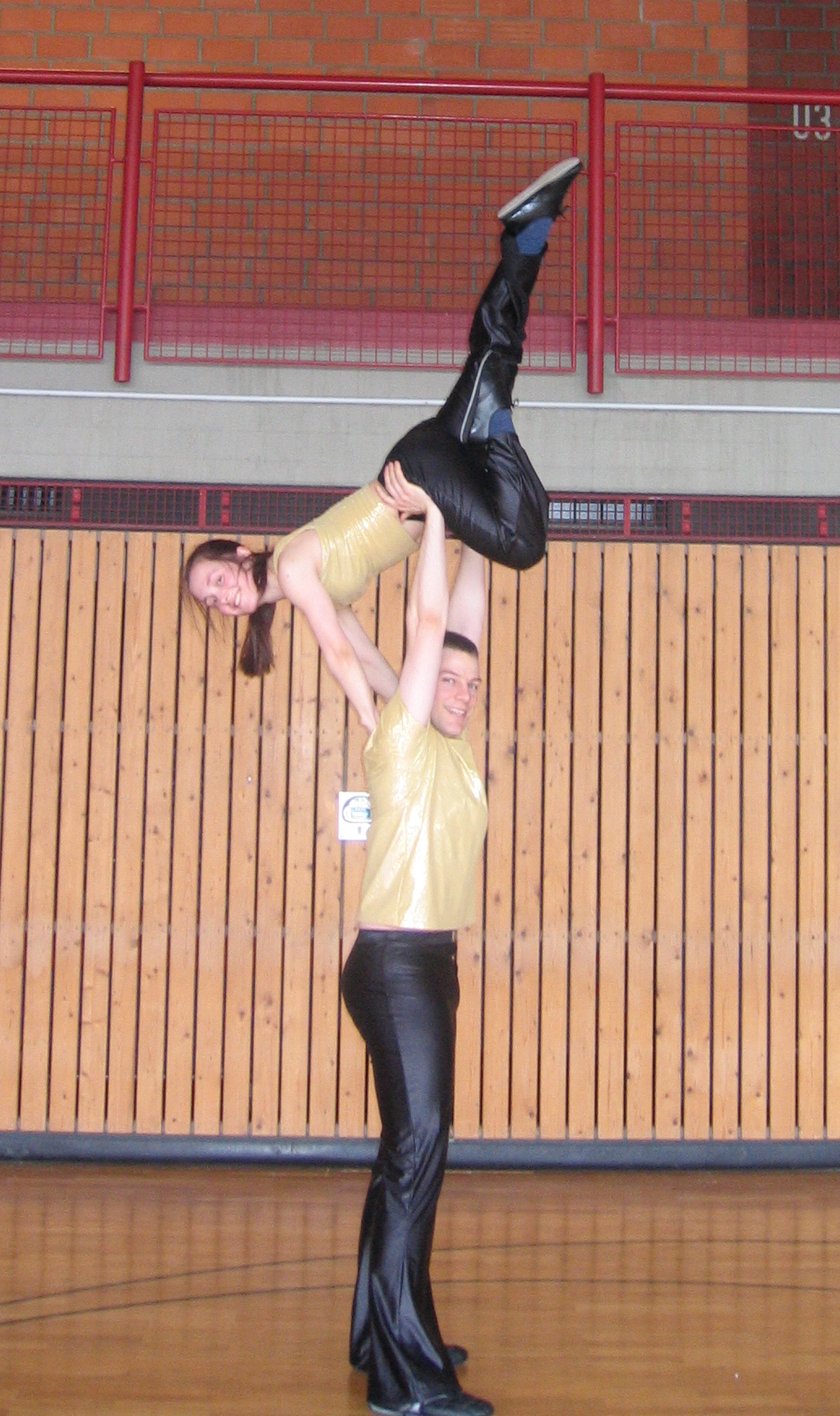

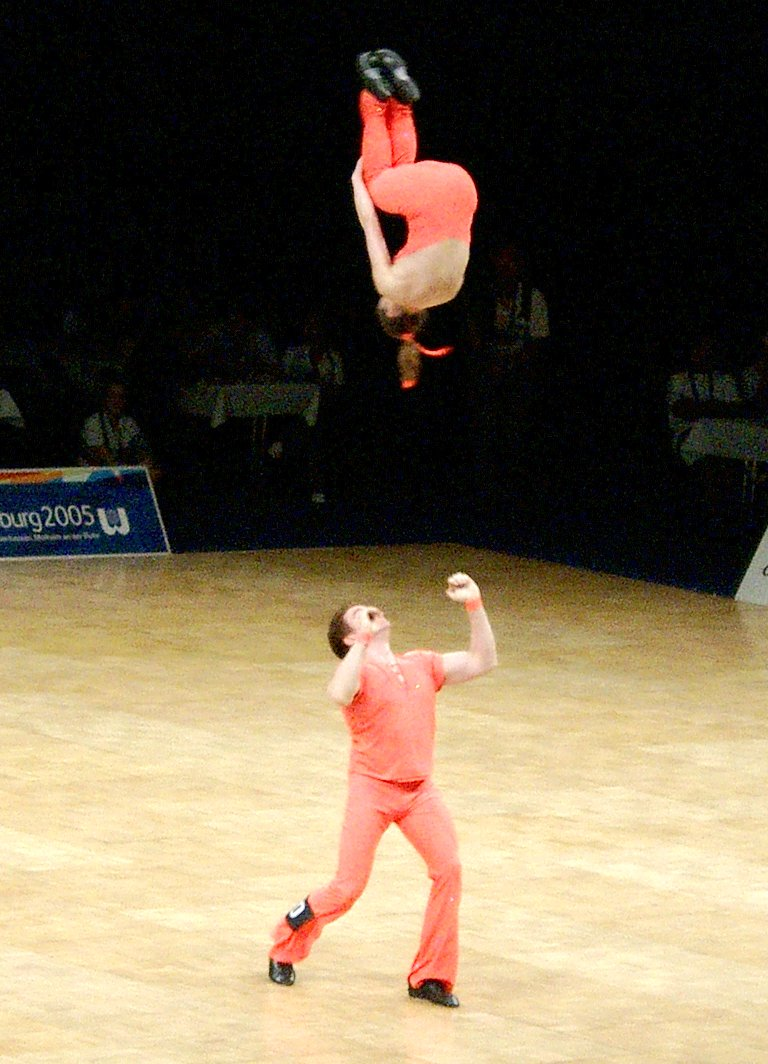
