= List of Signet Society members =

Members of art association at Harvard University, US

Following is a list of Signet Society members. The Signet Society is an organization at Harvard University that recognizes accomplishments in literature and the arts.

== Academia ==
- Emily Apter, professor chair of the Department of French Literature, Thought and Culture at New York University
- Derek Bok, Harvard University president
- James B. Conant, Harvard University president, scholar, chemist
- Charles W. Eliot, Harvard University president, chemist, mathematician
- Alexander Forbes, electrophysiologist, neurophysiologist, and professor of physiology at Harvard Medical School
- Owen Gingerich, professor emeritus of astronomy and of the history of science at Harvard University and a senior astronomer emeritus at the Smithsonian Astrophysical Observatory
- Peter J. Gomes, theologian and professor of Christian morals at Harvard Divinity School
- Mason Hammond, Classics scholar
- William James, philosopher, psychologist, and the first educator to offer a psychology course in the United States
- Marty Kaplan, professor at the USC Annenberg School for Communication & Journalism, chief speechwriter to Vice President Walter F. Mondale, and writer and producer for Walt Disney Studios
- Thomas Kuhn, philosopher and college professor
- William Coolidge Lane, librarian at Harvard University
- Abbott Lawrence Lowell, Harvard University president, historian
- Charles Eliot Norton, social critic, and Harvard professor
- Neil Rudenstine, Harvard President
- Ilya Vidrin, academic research-practitioner
- Andrew Weil, founder of the Arizona Center for Integrative Medicine at the University of Arizona College of Medicine

== Art ==
- Paul Bartlett (painter)

== Business ==
- Agnes Chu, businesswoman and producer who oversaw original content at the launch of Disney+ in 2019 and president of Condé Nast Entertainment (CNE) including media brands such as GQ, The New Yorker and Vogue
- Mark Penn, chairman and chief executive officer of Stagwell, chief strategy officer of Microsoft Corporation, and chief executive officer of Burson-Marsteller
- John Train, investment advisor and author

== Education ==
- Herbert R. Kohl, educator who founded the open classroom movement

== Entertainment ==
- Matthew Bohrer, actor
- Andy Borowitz, writer, comedian, actor
- Leonard Bernstein, composer and conductor
- Amy Brenneman, actress
- Nicholas Britell, film composer and producer
- Ben Cosgrove, composer and multi-instrumentalist
- Tommy Lee Jones, actor
- Rashida Jones, actress
- Marty Kaplan, writer and producer for Walt Disney Studios, chief speechwriter to Vice President Walter F. Mondale, and professor at the USC Annenberg School for Communication & Journalism
- Douglas Kenney, co-founder of National Lampoon, comedy writer, producer, and actor in Animal House and Caddyshack
- John Lithgow, actor
- Donal Logue, actor
- James Murdoch, media owner
- Conan O'Brien, talk show host
- Natalie Portman, actress
- Whit Stillman, writer-director
- Tom Werner, producer, Red Sox co-owner
- Sabrina Wu, writer, comedian, and actor
- Alan "Scooter" Zackheim, reality show winner Beauty and the Geek

== Journalism ==
- Jill Abramson, executive editor of The New York Times
- Adam Gopnik, writer for The New Yorker
- Hendrik Hertzberg, principal political commentator for The New Yorker magazine, speechwriter for President Jimmy Carter, and editor of The New Republic
- Walter Isaacson, chair and CEO of CNN and the editor of Time
- Joseph Lelyveld, executive editor of The New York Times
- George Plimpton, sports journalist who helped found The Paris Review
- Frank Rich, essayist and liberal op-ed columnist with The New York Times
- Reihan Salam, conservative political commentator, president of the Manhattan Institute for Policy Research, executive editor of National Review, a contributing editor at National Affairs, and a contributing editor at The Atlantic
- Alessandra Stanley, co-founder of Air Mail
- Andrew Sullivan, founder of the political blog The Daily Dish
- Richard Tofel, former president of ProPublica
- Fareed Zakaria, editor, author, commentator

== Literature ==
- James Agee, novelist, screenwriter, poet, author
- Conrad Aiken, author
- John Ashbery, poet, writer
- Robert Benchley, writer and actor
- John Berendt, writer
- Earl Derr Biggers, novelist and playwright
- T. S. Eliot, poet, author
- Robert Frost, poet
- Donald Hall, poet
- Seamus Heaney, poet
- Leslie Jamison, novelist and essayist
- Norman Mailer, writer
- Samuel Eliot Morison, Pulitzer Prize winning author, maritime historian, and retired Rear Admiral
- George Plimpton, writer, journalist
- George Santayana, philosopher, poet, novelist
- Arthur Schlesinger Jr., historian, author, winner of the 1966 Pulitzer Prize for Biography or Autobiography.
- Wallace Stevens, poet
- Trumbull Stickney, poet
- John Updike, writer
- John Hall Wheelock, poet

== Politics ==
- Benazir Bhutto, Prime Minister of Pakistan
- Charles Joseph Bonaparte, United States Attorney General and United States Secretary of the Navy
- Hamilton Fish II, United States Congress
- Jay Rockefeller, United States Senate
- Franklin D. Roosevelt, 32nd President of the United States
- James Roosevelt, U.S. House of Representatives, chairman of the California Democratic Party
- Theodore Roosevelt, 26th President of the United States
- Chuck Schumer, United States Senate
- Caspar Weinberger, United States Secretary of Defense, director of the Office of Management and Budget, California State Assembly, and chairman of the Federal Trade Commission
- William Weld, Massachusetts Governor

== Other ==
- Lionel de Jersey Harvard, collateral descended of Harvard College founder

== Fictional members ==
- James "Toofer" Spurlock, fictional character on television show 30 Rock
