= Group dance =

Dance performed by a coordinated group

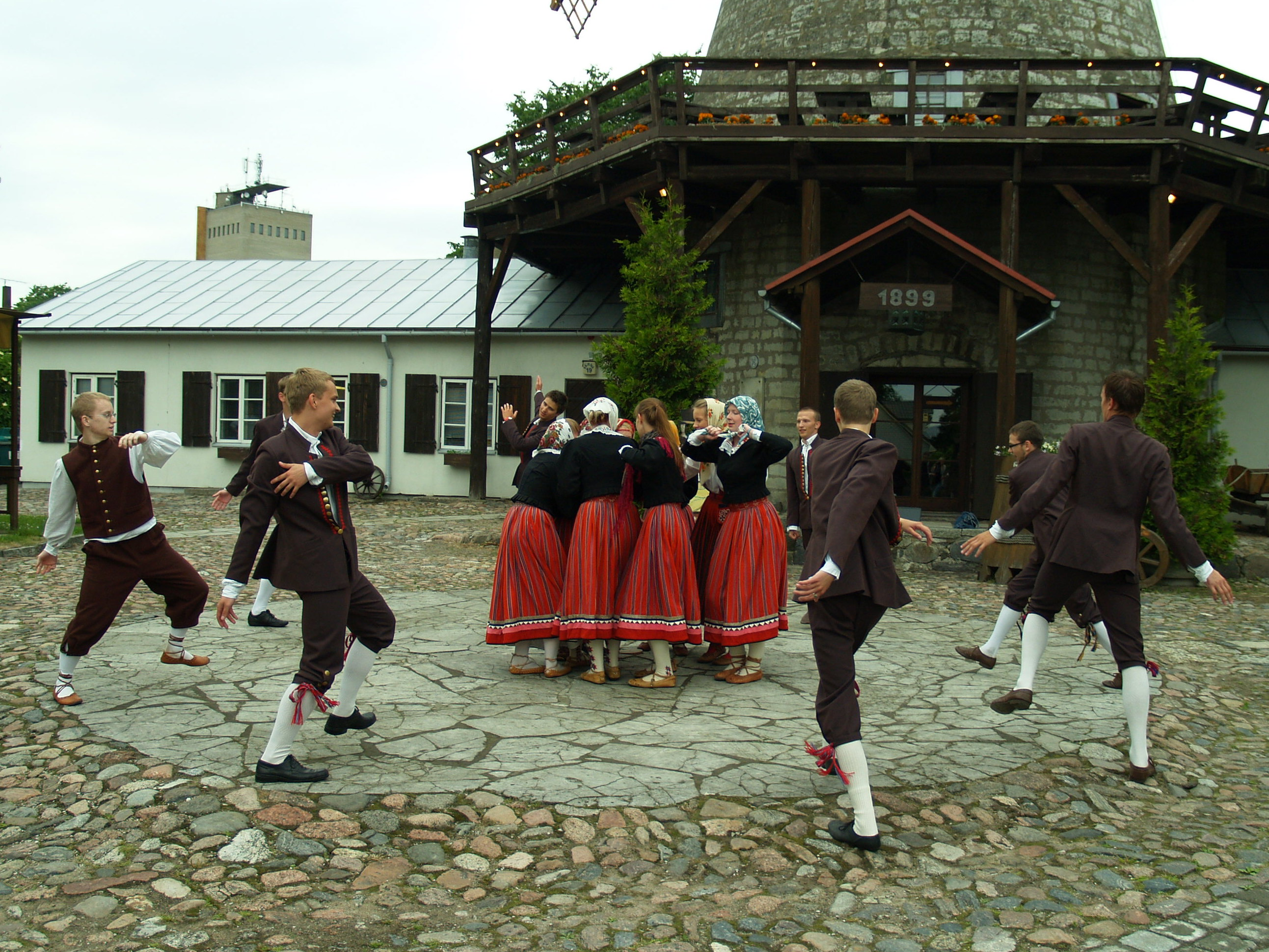
The University of Tartu Folk Art Ensemble performing in Estonia

Group dance is dance performed by several people whose movements are coordinated with one another. It differs from solo dance and from partner dance in which each couple dances independently of the others. A group dance can include several couples, as in a quadrille.

The dancers may perform the same movements together or take different, complementary parts in a larger pattern. Group dancing can involve a rehearsed choreography or arise spontaneously as dancers respond to the music and to one another.

== Formations ==
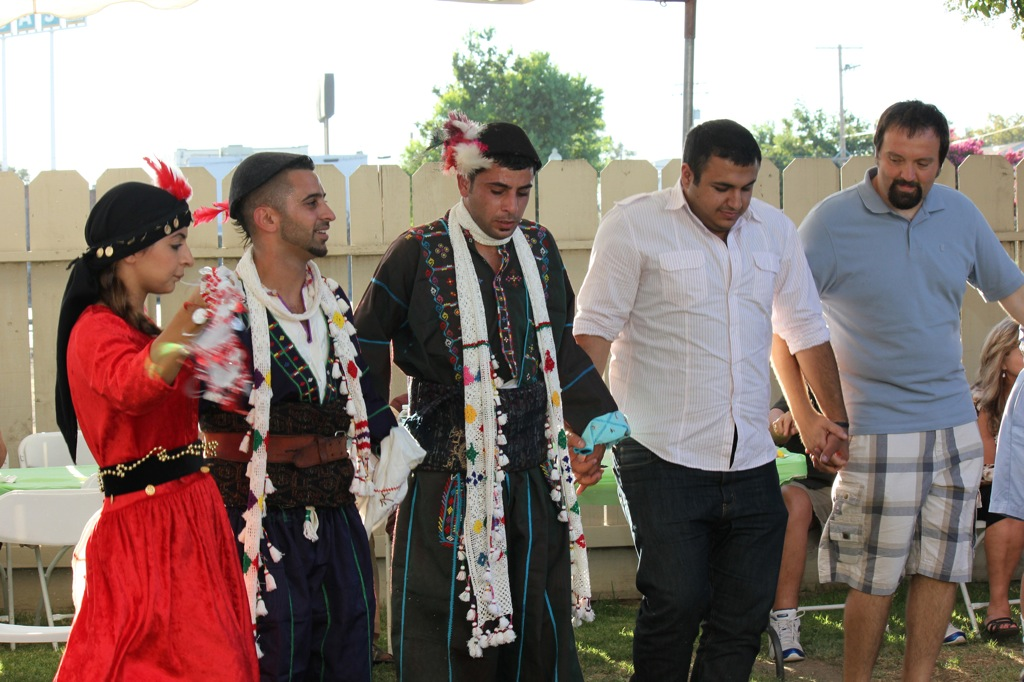
Assyrians dancing khigga, an Assyrian folk dance

In line dances, dancers stand in rows and repeat a sequence of steps in unison. They may turn to face a new direction as the sequence continues. In circle dances, dancers may hold hands to form a ring. In the Brazilian ciranda, for example, participants face the centre and move around it together. New dancers can join by opening the ring. If the circle becomes too large, another can form inside it.

Groups of couples can form squares, lines or circles. The quadrille is usually danced by four couples arranged in a square. In the Brazilian quadrilha of the June festivals, couples move through lines, circles and other figures. A caller announces the movements. In competitive formation dancing, couples perform a routine together, moving in unison and making patterns on the dance floor.

== History and social settings ==
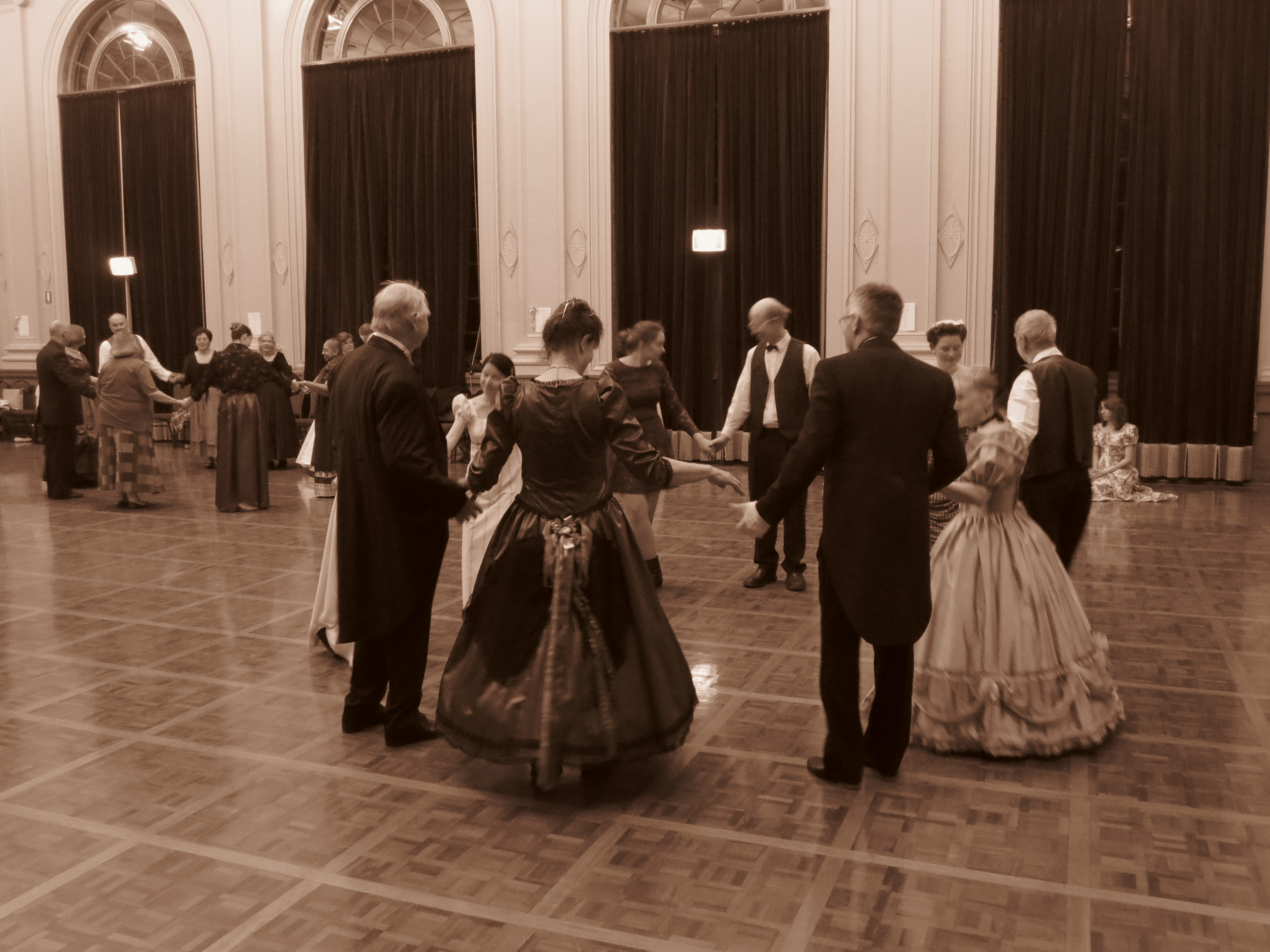
Set dancing at a ball in the Albert Hall, Canberra, in 2016

In late eighteenth-century Vienna, the minuet was performed as a group dance by many couples at once. Group dances remained prominent in ballrooms in the early nineteenth century. The quadrille developed from the eighteenth-century French contredanse. The grand march, or polonaise, was often used to open a ball, with lines of couples following patterns around the room. Another group dance, the German cotillion, combined dancing with party games led by a conductor.

Group routines also accompany popular songs. At wedding receptions, examples include dances to "Macarena", "Cha-Cha Slide" and "Time Warp". Some routines have simple steps that guests can follow, while others require practice. In Italy, balli di gruppo ('group dances') are part of entertainment at holiday resorts and summer camps. They are also danced at summer festivals, pool parties and beach gatherings, often to Latin-influenced pop songs.

Dancing together can also help form social bonds. Research reviewed by Bernhard Fink and colleagues found that people who danced in synchrony reported greater social closeness than those whose movements were only partly synchronized or were unsynchronized. Much of the research on synchrony was conducted in laboratory settings, which may differ from everyday dancing.

== Examples ==
Group dances include the following forms and styles:

- Folk dance
  - Circle dance
    - Ciranda
  - Contra dance
  - English country dance
  - Maypole dance
  - Quadrilha
  - Square dance
    - Traditional square dance
    - Modern Western square dance
- Formation dance
- Line dance
- Novelty and fad dances
  - Bunny hop
  - Chicken Dance
  - Para Para
- Polonaise
- Quadrille
- Round dance
- Rueda de Casino
- Universal Peace Dance

== See also ==
- Outline of dance
- List of dances
