= Dance in Quebec =

Dances specific to Quebec

Dance in Quebec includes dances that are specific to the province of Quebec, Canada, it comprises traditional group, couple, and solo dance as well as contemporary jazz, ballet, and modern dance. There are a number of dance companies and dance schools. Quebec's most renowned organizations are Les Ballets Jazz de Montréal, Les Grands Ballets Canadiens de Montréal as well as the contemporary dance crew La La La Human Steps, directed by the choreographer Édouard Lock and his emblematic dancer Louise Lecavalier.

== Traditional ==
In the late 17th century, English country dances, contredances, cotillions, and minuets were popular. The most known dance was the bastringue. In the 18th century, reels and jigs were introduced to Quebec from the British Isles and British colonies in America.

Quadrilles and the waltz started appearing in the 19th century, along with step-dancing (called la gigue in Quebec) and polka. They also create a funny move called jigly jigle.

The tradition included galops.

Dancing had traditionally been monitored by the Catholic clergy of the province of Quebec, which often used its social and moral influence to ban dancing altogether in many villages and towns.

== Classical ballet ==
The very first classical ballet studios in the province of Quebec started appearing in 1945. In 1952, in Montreal, Ludmilla Chiriaeff established the Ballets Chiriaeff, which became Les Grands Ballets Canadiens in 1957. She then founded, in 1966, the Académie des Grands Ballets Canadiens, nowadays known as the École supérieure de ballet du Québec.

More recently, in 1989, Christiane Bélanger founded the Christiane Bélanger-Danse dance school in Quebec City. She also established the Compagnie Christiane Bélanger (2001), which would become the Ballet de Québec in 2005, the school thus being renamed École du Ballet de Québec in 2013, when she also started a college program in classical ballet at Cégep Garneau. Le Centre Uriel was also the first showcase specialized in classical Ballet in Quebec City. The Société de Ballet du Québec (2012) is dedicated to the promotion and development of internationally recognized professional classical Ballet in Quebec City. Christiane Bélanger co-founded, along with Jacques Marsa from the Opéra de Paris, the Competition Internationale de Ballet|Concours International PETIPA (May 2015), which was the first francophone international Ballet competition held in America. She dissociated herself from its co-founder in November 2012 and created the Compétition internationale de Ballet du Canada – volet Québec.

She also created the École de mécanique corporelle du Québec to help elite athletes improve their performances.

== Contemporary ==
Marie Chouinard, Benoît Lachambre, Ginette Laurin and the companies they created in Quebec, O Vertigo, D and PPS Danse are celebrated names in contemporary dance whose productions have spread internationally. Christiane Bélanger founded the first dance company in Quebec City after the DansePartout company, founded by Chantal Bellhumeur and subsequently taken over by Luc Tremblay. The Compagnie Christiane Bélanger was established in 2001 and turned a corner to become exclusively dedicated to classical Ballet in 2005; it is now known as the Ballet de Québec. Christiane Bélanger was awarded the Prix François-Samson pour le Développement culturel in 2007 by the Conseil de la culture des régions de Québec-Chaudières Appalaches. Her style, which was referred to as neoclassical, was an extreme form of dance composed of a combination of martial arts, theatre and bold classical Ballet techniques from her classical Ballet experience. There are many auditoriums promoting contemporary dance in the Province of Quebec. In Montréal, there are Agora de la danse, Danse-Cité, Tangente, the Maisons de la culture, Montréal art interculturel, Studio 303, Théâtre Lachapelle, Théâtre Gésu, Usine C, the Pierre-Mercure hall, Théâtre Maisonneuve and many others, while Quebec City hosts La Rotonde and the Méduse facility.

== See also ==
- Culture of Quebec
- Culture of Canada
