= List of partner dance books =

Listed below are books that describe the techniques of various partner dances.

== Ballroom dancing ==
=== Basic books for the International Style ===
- Alex Moore:
  - The Revised Technique (ten editions since 1948, numerous reprints)
  - Ballroom Dancing (eleven editions since 1936, numerous reprints)
  - Popular Variations (numerous reprints and editions since 1954)
- Victor Silvester, Modern Ballroom Dancing. Stanley Paul, London (first published 1928, 1993 edition ISBN 0-09-178193-0, current edition 2005)
- Imperial Society of Teachers of Dancing (ISTD):
  - The Ballroom Technique (1993), based on The Revised Technique by Alex Moore.
  - The Revised Technique of Latin-American Dancing (reprints and editions since 1971)
  - Popular Variations in Latin-American Dancing (1982)
- Guy Howard, Technique of Ballroom Dancing (six editions since 1976)
- Walter Laird:
  - Technique of Latin Dancing (eight editions since 1961)
  - Technique of Latin Dancing Supplement
- Craig Revel Horwood, Ballroom Dancing, Teach Yourself (2010)

=== Advanced books for the International Style ===
- Christopher R. Willis (FISTD):
  - Leading Competition Figures: Waltz and Foxtrot, ISBN 0991406214; ISBN 978-0991406210
  - Leading Competition Figures: Tango and Quickstep, ISBN 0991406222; ISBN 978-0991406227
  - Competition Figures: Charts and Footpatterns, ISBN 0991406230; ISBN 978-0991406234

=== Basic books for the American Style ===
- Richard M. Stephenson and Joseph Iaccarino, Complete Book of Ballroom Dancing (1992) Main Street Books, ISBN 0-385-42416-7
- Jeffrey Allen, The Complete Idiot's Guide to Ballroom Dancing, 2nd edition 2006, ISBN 1-59257-577-3

== Partner and Social Dance Research and Scholarship ==
- Juliet E. McMains (2006) Glamour Addiction: Inside the American Ballroom Dance Industry Wesleyan University Press, ISBN 0-8195-6774-4
  The first in-depth study of the American DanceSport.
- Kristine M. McCusker, Diane Pecknold (2004) A Boy Named Sue: Gender and Country Music, University Press of Mississippi, ISBN 1-57806-678-6
  About roles gender plays in creating and marketing the Country /Western musical and dance forms.

== Partner and Social Dance Teaching ==
This list contains books that provide guidance for how to teach partner/social dancing. It does not include books, such as The Dancing Master, that primarily focus on the dance steps or technique, rather than on how to teach.

- Edith Ballwebber, 1938, Group Instruction in Social Dancing, A. S. Barnes & Company, Inc
- Dorothy Norman Cropper, 1939, Teacher's Manual of Ballroom Dancing, IHRA Publishing Co.
- August Harris & Donnabel Keys, 1940, Teaching Social Dance, Prentice-Hall, Inc
- Alma Heaton, 1965, Techniques of Teaching Ballroom Dance, Brigham Young University
- Judy Patterson Wright, 1996, Social Dance Instruction, Human Kinetics Publishers, ISBN 978-0873228305
- Diane Jarmolow, 2011, Teach Like a Pro, Ballroom Dance Teachers College, ISBN 978-0983526100
- Rudi Trautz, 2021, The Art of Teaching Social Dancing, ISBN 978-3943599862
- Thomas Hill, 2025, How to Teach Ballroom Dancing, ISBN 979-8328048156

== General ==
- Patrice Tanaka, Becoming Ginger Rogers: How Ballroom Dancing Made Me A Happier Woman, Better Partner, and Smarter CEO', BenBella Books (2011) ISBN 978-193666103-9
- Matt Barber, Beginning Ballroom: Why's, Do's, Don'ts, and Shoes. (2011). ISBN 978-1-4535-5262-9

== Other lists ==
- The US Library of Congress has a collection of 250+ dance manuals, from 1490 to 1920, with full scans.
- Library of Dance has a curated list 6000+ of dance books, from the 15th century to today, many of which are partner dance books. 2000+ are downloadable.
