= Dance theory =

Contemporary dance philosophy

Dance theory is the philosophy underpinning contemporary dance, including formal ideologies, aesthetic concepts, and technical attributes. It is a fairly new field of study, developing largely in the 20th century. It can be considered a branch of expression theory and is closely related to music theory and specifically musicality. While musicality deals with finding a particular matching pair of dance and music that fit each other in various respects, dance theory is a broad term encompassing the origins, styles, genre, footwork and artistic expression of dance.

Three broad categories of dance theory, as you may find them described in universities or dance institutes, are philosophy (concerning the aesthetic meanings behind dance, or semiotics), choreology (movement analysis and description), sociology (regarding the role of dance in society and culture).

Dance theory deals with anatomical movements (such as foot-work, etc.), as well as partner interactions, and their associations to each other and to music as art. It explores the communicative, physical, mental, emotional, and artistic aspects of dance as a medium of human expression and interaction. In doing so the various nuances between the dance genres and styles are analyzed with respect to their social settings and cultures.

As dance is a ubiquitous element of culture, dance theory attempts to determine the instinctual nature of dance, and what makes various movements appear natural or forced.

It is possible, through the writing and drawing of dances within a sphere, to understand that all dance is based on natural body movements, that is the moving of joints limbs and legs and fingers. Dance theory is based on these founding principles, that is the sphere and lines of the body, to derive, show and demonstrate how dance is done. This is achieved by showing which movements to do by and at what speed. It is hypothetically possible to draw and work out a dance by using sphere lines and arrows. Many dance books state how this is done.

== See also ==
- Dance research
