= Musicality =

Musical term

Musicality (music-al-ity) is "sensitivity to, knowledge of, or talent for music" or "the quality or state of being musical", and is used to refer to specific if vaguely defined qualities in pieces and/or genres of music, such as melodiousness and harmoniousness. These definitions are somewhat hampered by the difficulty of defining music, but, colloquially, "music" is often contrasted with noise and randomness. Judges of contest music may describe a performance as bringing the music on the page to life; of expressing more than the mere faithful reproduction of pitches, rhythms, and composer dynamic markings. In the company of two or more musicians, there is the added experience of the ensemble effect in which the players express something greater than the sum of their individual parts. A person considered musical has the ability to perceive and reproduce differences in aspects of music including pitch, rhythm, and harmony (see: ear training). Two types of musicality may be differentiated: to be able to perceive music (musical receptivity) and to be able to reproduce music in addition to creating music (musical creativity).

== Music vs. musicality ==
Many studies on the cognitive and biological origins of music are centered on the question of what defines music. Can birdsong, the song structure of humpback whales, a Thai elephant orchestra, or the interlocking duets of Gibbons be considered music? This is now generally seen as a pitfall. In trying to answer this question, it is important to separate the notions of "music" and "musicality". Musicality – in all its complexity – can be defined as a natural, spontaneously developing set of traits based on and constrained by our biological and cognitive system, and music – in all its variety – as a social and cultural construct based on musicality. Or simply put: without musicality, there is no music.

However, it is still a challenge to demarcate precisely what makes up this complex trait we call musicality. What are the cognitive and biological mechanisms that are essential to perceive, make, and appreciate music? Only when we have identified these fundamental mechanisms are we in a position to see how these might have evolved. In other words: the study of the evolution of music cognition is dependent on a characterization of the basic mechanisms that make up musicality.

Colwyn Trevarthen has researched the musicality of babies, including its use in communication.

=== Notes ===
- Resources of a musician: a notable musician draws from several essential resources: musicality, material (voice, dexterity), practice, education
- Relation to dancing: Musicality is also related to dancing, since musicality is essential for becoming a good dancer.
- Relation to structure: Certain types of music have a regular inner structure, which a musical person is able to pick up intuitively. A viable musical structure is supportive of musicality.

== Connected arguments ==
- Lead and follow (dance)
- Connection (dance)
- Dance theory
- Evolutionary musicology
- Music Pedagogy
- Corporeal Musicality

== Bibliography ==
- Honing, H.; Ploeger, A. (2012). "Cognition and the Evolution of Music: Pitfalls and Prospects". Topics in Cognitive Science. 4 (4): pp. 514–524.
- Schögler, Ben and Trevarthen, Colwyn. To Sing and Dance Together", On Being Moved: From Mirror Neurons to Empathy, John Benjamins Publishing Company, Amsterdam.
- Sutton, Christopher, 2024,Musicality, How you too can learn music like a gifted prodigy. , Musical U book ISBN 1068510900.
- Trewarthen Colwin, The Roots of Musicality, 2005, Hachette UK
- Wallin, N.J., Merker, B., & Brown, S. (2000). The Origins of Music, Cambridge, Massachusetts: MIT Press.
