= Contredance =

Contredance may refer to:

- Contredanse, a type of French dance with associated music that flourished in the 17th and 18th centuries that blended British and French folk dancing music and steps
- Contra dance, an American folk dance practice based in several different European folk dance traditions which includes but is not limited to the French contredanse.
