= Pas de deux =

Ballet dance for two dancers

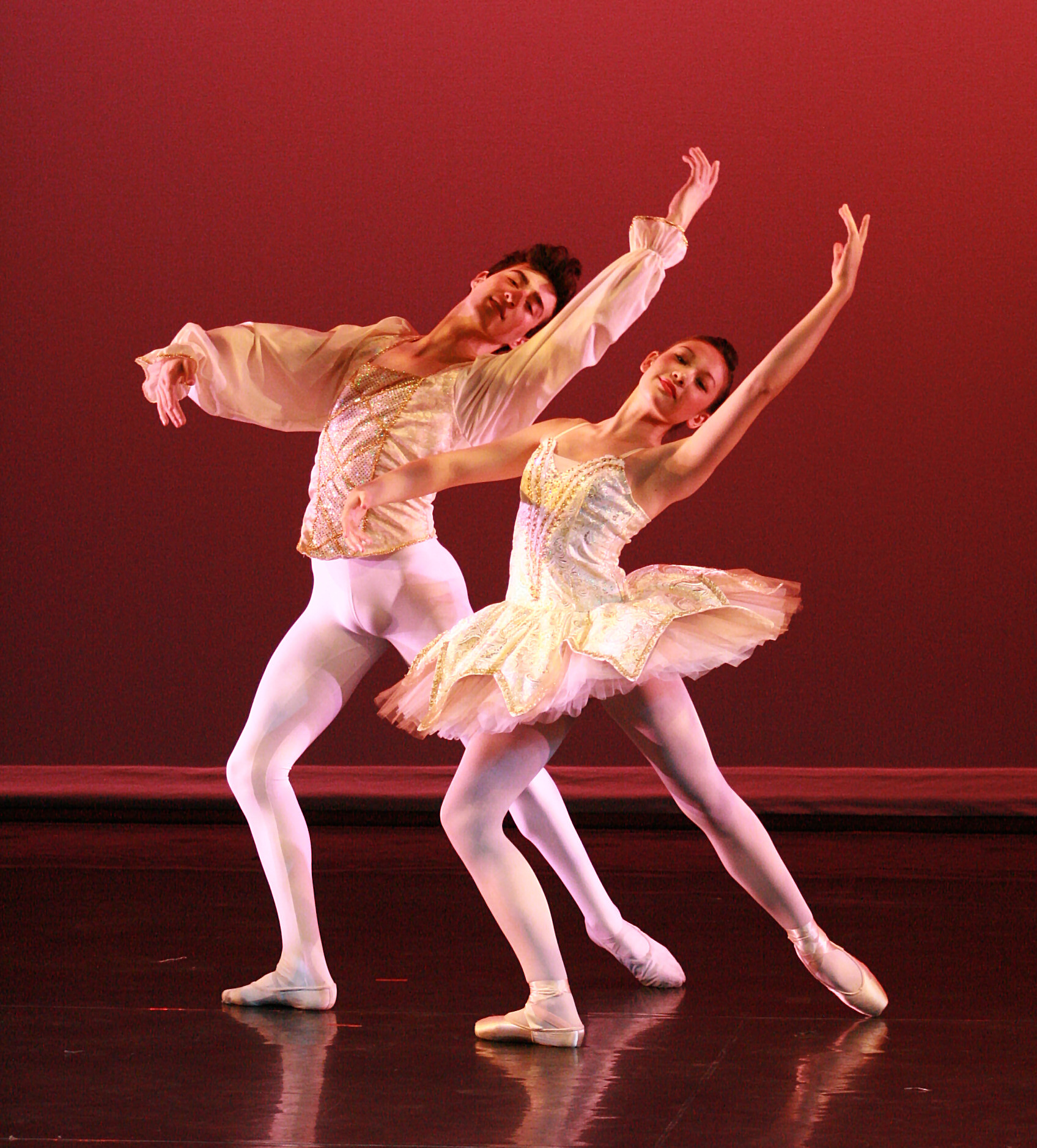
Dancers performing Paquita grand pas de deux entrée

In ballet, a pas de deux [pɑ d(ə) dø] (French, literally "step of two") is a dance duet in which two dancers perform ballet steps together. The pas de deux is characteristic of classical ballet and can be found in many well-known ballets, including Sleeping Beauty, Swan Lake, and Giselle. It is most often performed by a male and a female (a danseur and a ballerina) though there are exceptions, such as in the film White Nights, in which a pas de deux is performed by Mikhail Baryshnikov and Gregory Hines.

== Grand pas de deux ==
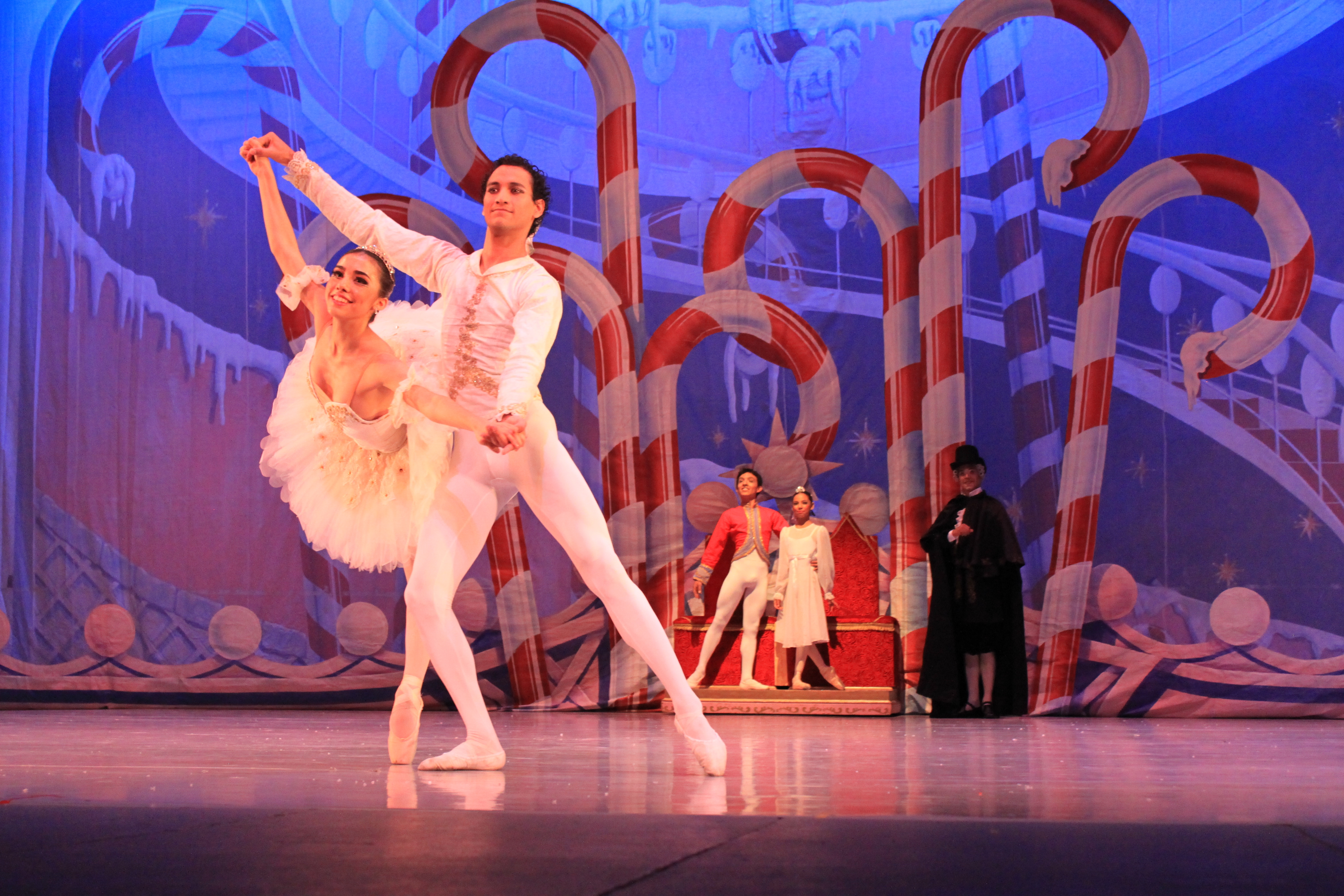
The Nutcracker (2011) grand pas de deux

A grand pas de deux is a structured pas de deux that typically has five parts, consisting of an entrée (introduction), an adagio, two variations (a solo for each dancer), and a coda (conclusion). It is effectively a suite of dances that share a common theme, often symbolic of a love story or the partnership inherent in love, with the dancers portraying expressions of affectionate feelings and thoughts between romantic partners. It is often considered to be the pièce de résistance and bravura highlight of a ballet and is usually performed by a leading pair of principal dancers.

=== Entrée ===
A grand pas de deux usually begins with an entrée (literally "entrance"), which serves as a short prelude to and also unequivocally denotes the beginning of the dance suite. During the entrée, the dancers first appear on the stage and, typically with great pageantry, acknowledge each other and position themselves near each other in preparation for the subsequent adagio. Depending on the choreography, the ballerina and danseur may enter the stage simultaneously or at different times.

=== Adagio ===
The adagio or adage (meaning "slowly") part of a grand pas de deux features graceful and elaborate partnering by the dancing pair. In the adagio, the ballerina performs elegant, often slow and sustained movements while the danseur supports her. The danseur, in turn, strives to maintain a display of poise and seemingly effortless strength while providing support for the ballerina. The danseur may support the ballerina in a variety of common ways, including lifting her, holding and steadying her during turns, and offering a steady arm or hand for her to use as a "virtual barre" when she performs balancing feats that would be difficult or impossible without assistance. Because of this support the adagio is sometimes called supported adagio.

Examples

Arabesque penché to attitude

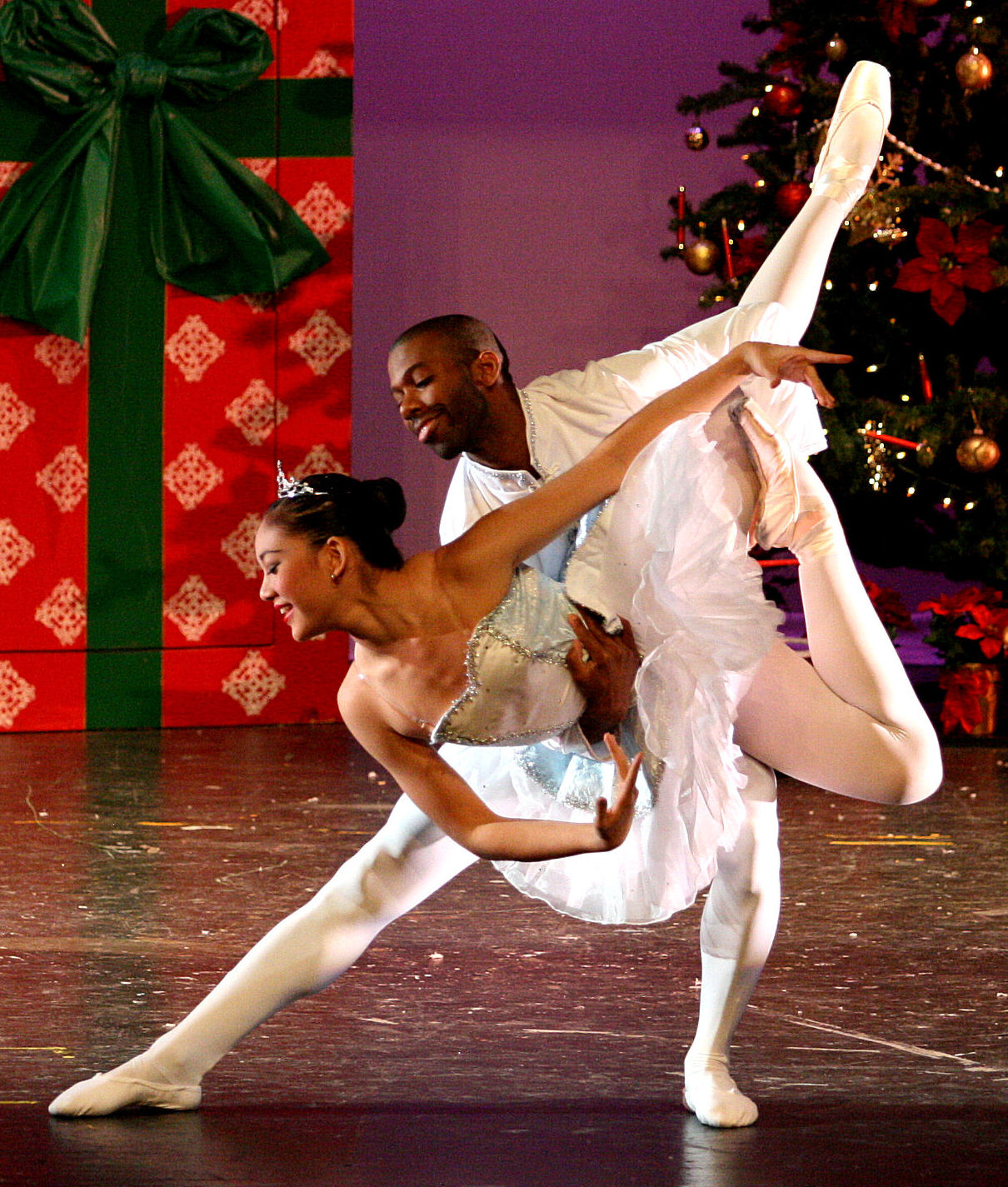
Fish dive

Partnered pirouettes

=== Variations ===
Upon completion of the adagio, the dancers separate and each dancer, in turn, takes center stage and performs a variation (a solo dance). In general, the variations are intended to showcase spectacular, acrobatic leaps and turns, as well as the skills and athleticism of the individual dancers. The danseur's variation is usually performed first, followed by the ballerina's variation.

Examples

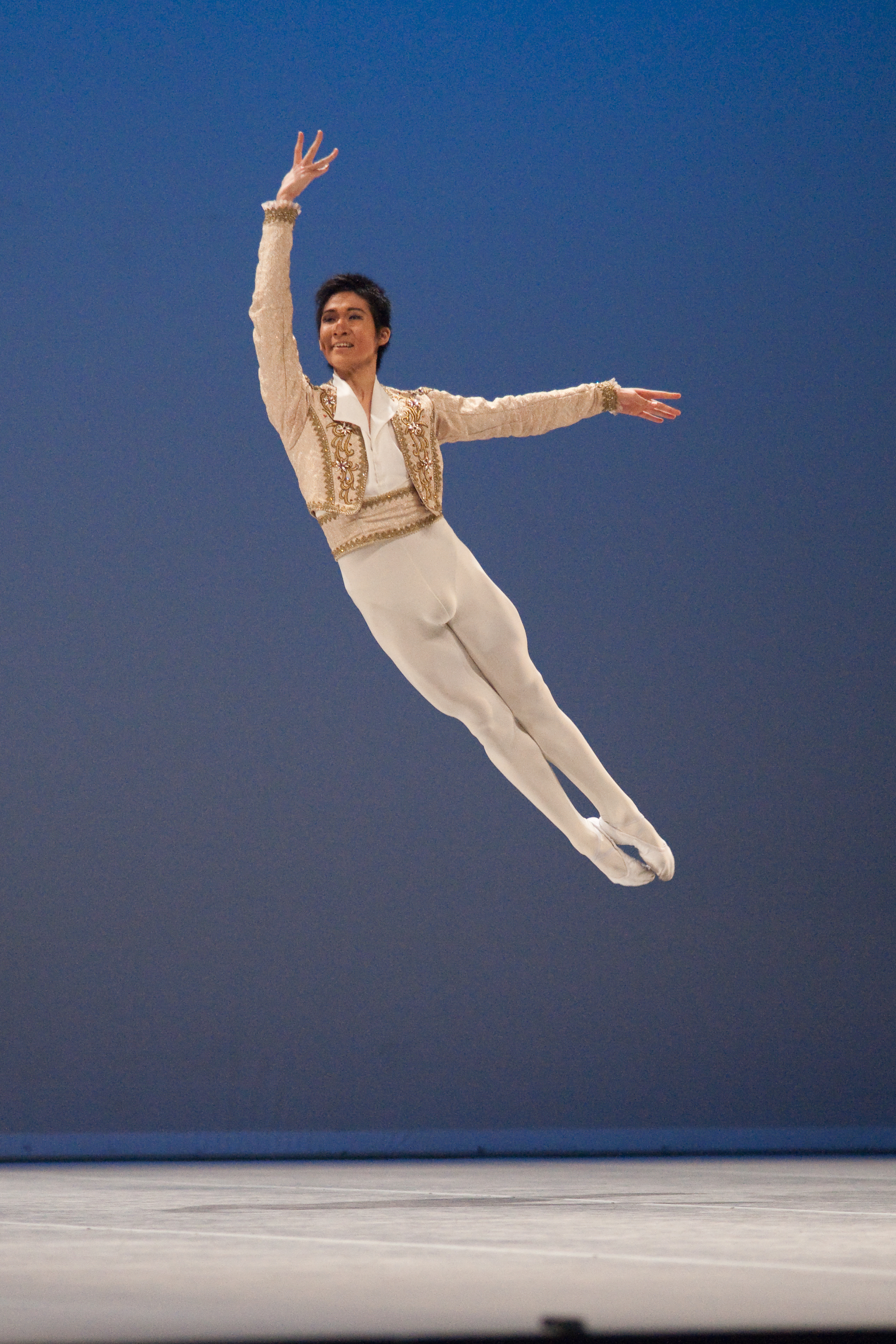

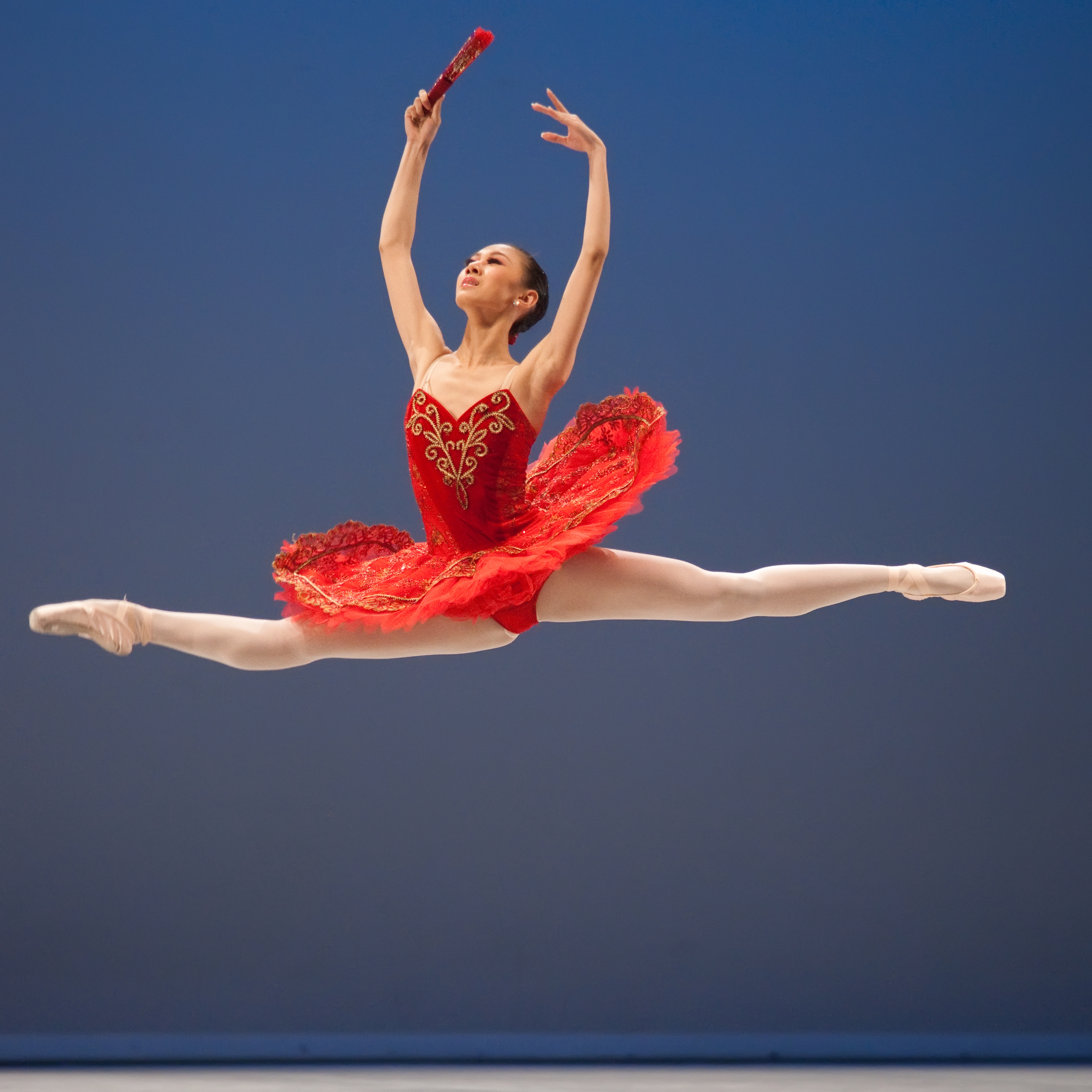

=== Coda ===
The coda (literally "tail") is the concluding segment of a grand pas de deux. Typically, it is a recapitulation of earlier segments of the grand pas de deux, consisting of elements that are characteristic of the adagio, variations, or both, and ends during a grand musical climax.

== History ==
Elements of the grand pas de deux first appeared in the early 18th century as opening acts of operas and ballets in which a couple would perform identical dance steps, sometimes while holding hands. At that time and throughout the Baroque period, ballet partner dancing was evolving to show more dramatic content. For example, in The Loves of Mars and Venus ballet of 1717, Mars (the male dancer) strove to portray gallantry, respect, ardent love, and adoration, while Venus showed bashfulness, reciprocal love, and wishful looks.

In the late 18th and early 19th centuries, a romantic pas de deux emerged that involved closer physical contact, with ballerinas dancing on their toes in the hands of their partners. As the 19th century progressed, the form became a showcase for the skills of the increasingly sophisticated ballerina.

The ballets of the late 19th century—particularly of those of Marius Petipa—introduced the concept of the grand pas de deux, which often served as the climax of a scene or an entire performance. This involved a consistent format of entrée and adagio by a pair of leading male and female dancers, followed by virtuosic solos (first by the male and then the female) and a finale. During the 20th century, the grand pas de deux became more integrated with the story of the ballet, with increasingly acrobatic content.

== Notable pas de deux ==
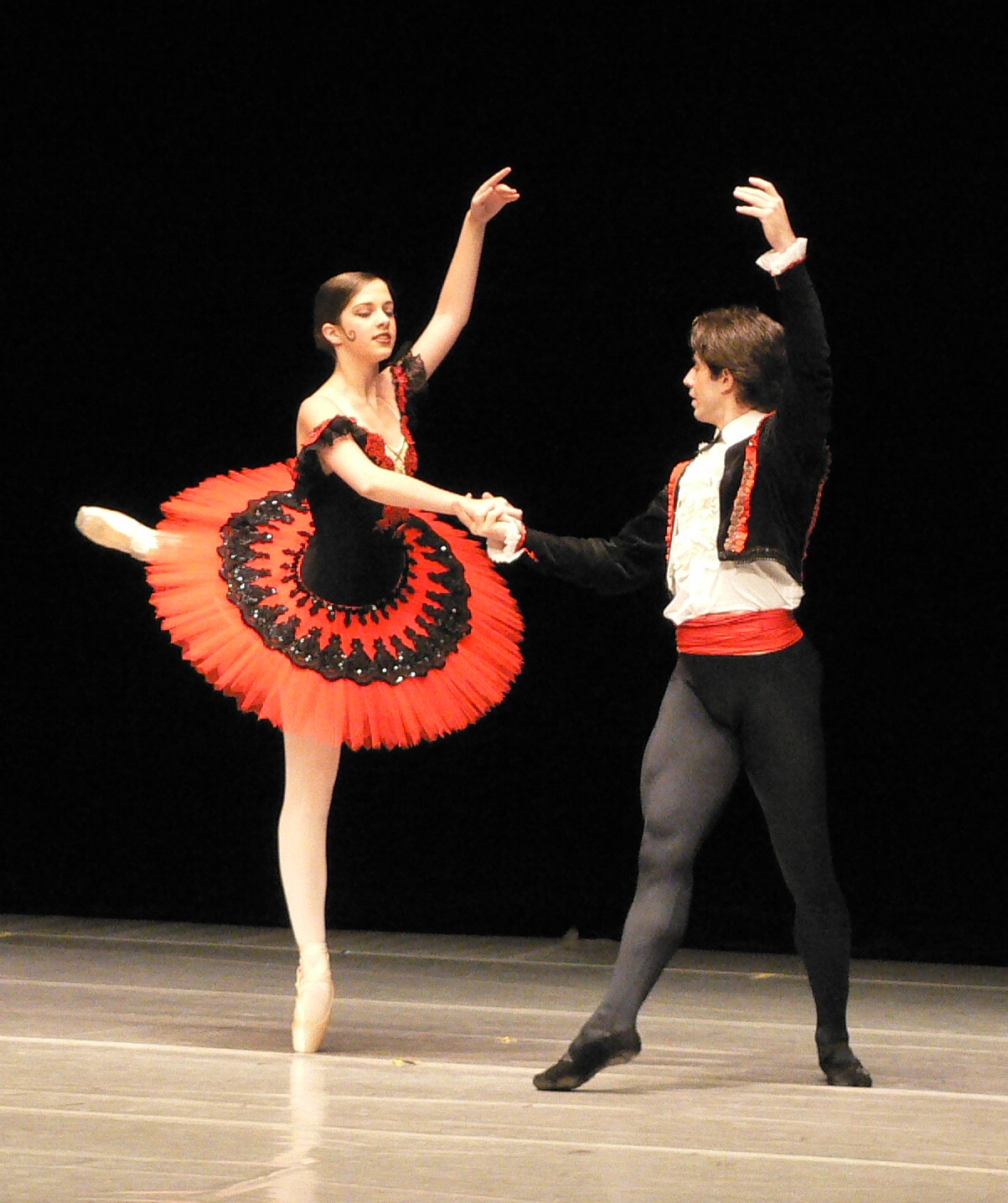
Grand Pas de deux from Don Quixote

- White Swan Pas de deux, from the second act of Swan Lake
- Black Swan Pas de deux, from the third act of Swan Lake
- Bluebird Pas de deux, from the third act of The Sleeping Beauty
- Coppélia Grand Pas de deux
- Diane and Actéon Pas de deux, from the ballet Le Roi Candaule
- Flower Festival in Genzano Pas de deux
- La Sylphide Pas de deux
- Le Corsaire Pas de deux
- Don Quixote Grand Pas de deux
- The Nutcracker Grand Pas de deux
- Paquita Grand Pas de deux
- The Talisman Pas de deux
- Harlequinade Pas de deux
- La fille mal gardée Pas de deux

== See also ==
- Pas de trois, a dance for three dancers
- Pas de quatre, a dance for four dancers
- Grand pas
