= Frame (dance) =

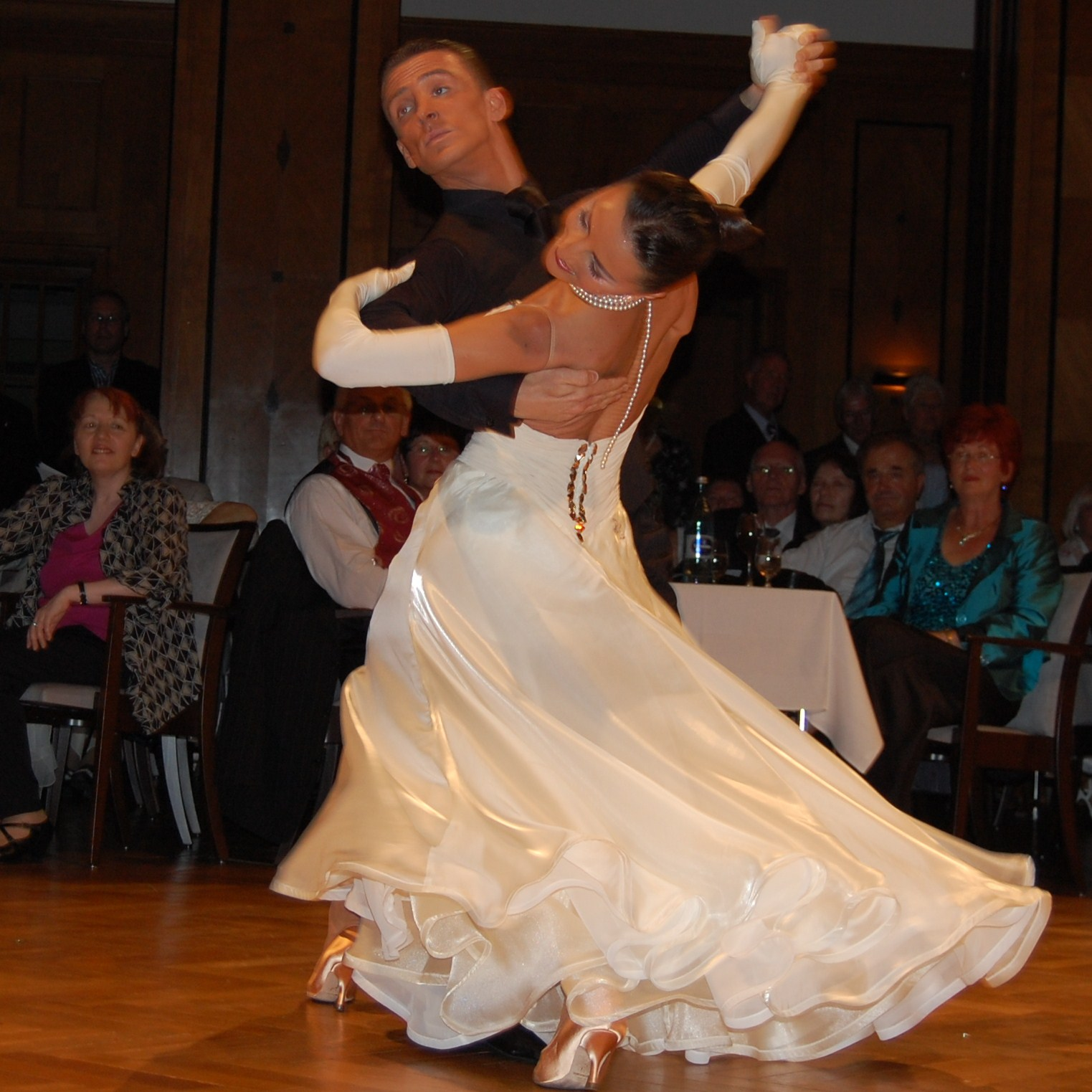
Frame in ballroom dancing such as international standard waltz

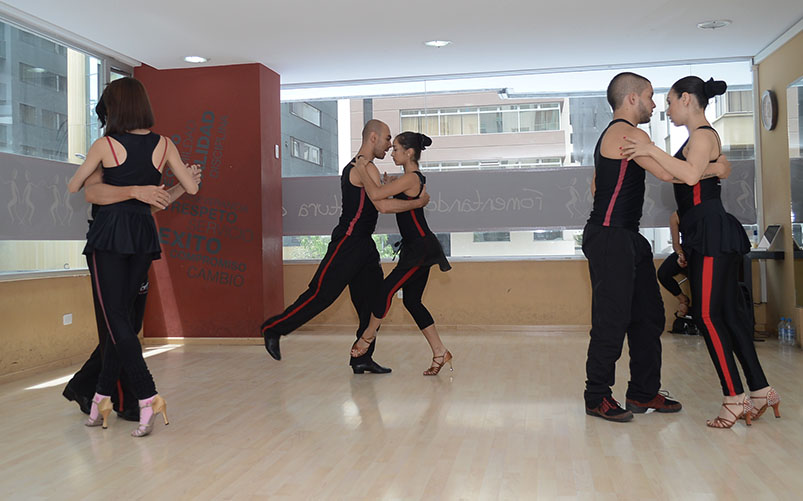
Frame in salsa

In ballroom dancing and other dances, frame is the way the dancers' upper bodies are held when in dancing position. In swing and blues dances, frame is the body shape and muscle tone maintained by dancers, which allows the leader to communicate moves to the follower.

== Ballroom and other dances ==
The frame is the way the dancers hold their hands, arms, shoulders, neck, head and upper torso. A good frame helps with balance and movement and also produces a good appearance of the dance couple.

The correct way to hold a frame depends on the particular dance; it is different in International Standard, International Latin, social Latin dances such as salsa, and others.

== Swing and blues dances ==
The frame provides connection between the dance partners, making leading and following possible. A frame is a stable structural combination of both bodies maintained through the dancers' arms and/or legs, and allows the leader to transmit body movement to the follower, and for the follower to suggest ideas to the leader.
