= Connection (dance) =

Dance

In partner dancing, connection is physical, non-verbal communication between dancers to facilitate synchronized or coordinated dance movements. Some forms of connection involve "lead/follow" in which one dancer (the "lead") directs the movements of the other dancer (the "follower") by means of non-verbal directions conveyed through a physical connection between the dancers. In other forms, connection involves multiple dancers (more than two) without a distinct leader or follower (e.g. contact improvisation). Connection refers to a host of different techniques in many types of partner dancing, especially (but not exclusively) those that feature significant physical contact between the dancers, including the Argentine Tango, Lindy Hop, Balboa, East Coast Swing, West Coast Swing, Salsa, and other ballroom dances.

Other forms of communication, such as visual cues or spoken cues, sometimes aid in connecting with one's partner, but are often used in specific circumstances (e.g., practicing figures, or figures which are purposely danced without physical connection). Connection can be used to transmit power and energy as well as information and signals; some dance forms (and some dancers) primarily emphasize power or signaling, but most are probably a mixture of both. Philosopher of dance Ilya Vidrin argues that connection between partners involves norm-based communication that include “a physical exchange of information on the basis of ethically-bound conditions” (proximity, orientation, and points of contact) which constrain agency and predictability.

== Lead/Follow ==
Following and leading in a partner dance is accomplished by maintaining a physical connection called the frame that allows the leader to transmit body movement to the follower, and for the follower to suggest ideas to the leader. A frame is a stable structural combination of both bodies maintained through the dancers' arms and/or legs.

Connection occurs in both open and closed dance positions (also called "open frame" and "closed frame").

In closed position with body contact, connection is achieved by maintaining the frame. The follower moves to match the leader, maintaining the pressure between the two bodies as well as the position.

When creating frame, tension is the primary means of establishing communication. Changes in tension are made to create rhythmic variations in moves and movements, and are communicated through points of contact. In an open position or a closed position without body contact, the hands and arms alone provide the connection, which may be one of three forms: tension, compression or neutral.

- During tension or leverage connection, the dancers are pulling away from each other with an equal and opposite force. The arms do not originate this force alone: they are often assisted by tension in trunk musculature, through body weight or by momentum.
- During compression connection, the dancers are pushing towards each other.
- In a neutral position, the hands do not impart any force other than the touch of the follower's hands in the leader's.

In swing dances, tension and compression may be maintained for a significant period of time. In other dances, such as Latin, tension and compression may be used as indications of upcoming movement. However, in both styles, tension and compression do not signal immediate movement: the follow must be careful not to move prior to actual movement by the lead. Until then, the dancers must match pressures without moving their hands. In some styles of Lindy Hop, the tension may become quite high without initiating movement.

The general rule for open connections is that moves of the leader's hands back, forth, left or right are originated through moves of the entire body. Accordingly, for the follower, a move of the connected hand is immediately transformed into the corresponding move of the body. Tensing the muscles and locking the arm achieves this effect but is neither comfortable nor correct. Such tension eliminates the subtler communication in the connection, and eliminates free movement up and down, such as is required to initiate many turns.

Instead of just tensing the arms, connection is achieved by engaging the shoulder, upper body and torso muscles. Movement originates in the body's core. A leader leads by moving himself and maintaining frame and connection. Different forms of dance and different movements within each dance may call for differences in the connection. In some dances the separation distance between the partners remains pretty constant. In others e.g. Modern Jive moving closer together and further apart are fundamental to the dance, requiring flexion and extension of the arms, alternating compression and tension.

The connection between two partners has a different feel in every dance and with every partner. Good social dancers adapt to the conventions of the dance and the responses of their partners.

== See also ==
- Frame
- Dance move
- Lead and follow
- Musicality
