= Ilya Vidrin =

Dr Ilya Vidrin
- Education: PhD, Coventry University; Ed.M., Harvard University; B.S., Northeastern University
- Known for: Choreography, Dance, Philosophy
- Movement: Dance Partnering
- Awards: "25 to Watch", Dance Magazine (2022)
- Website: ilyavidrin.com

Ilya Vidrin is an academic research-practitioner notable for his work on the theory and practice of partnering. He is Assistant Professor of Creative Practice Research and Core Faculty at the Institute of Experiential Robotics at Northeastern University and a Research Affiliate at Harvard MetaLab.

== Professional life ==
Ilya pursued undergraduate studies in Cognitive Neuroscience and Rhetorical Theory at Northeastern University. Ilya completed three years of intensive clinical research training in the Neurology Department at Beth Israel Medical Deaconess Center, with a focus on non-pharmacological therapies for cognitive and neurodegenerative disorders. Ilya went on to graduate school at Harvard University, earning a Master’s Degree in Education with a focus on Human Development and Psychology. At Harvard, Ilya worked on experimental research projects investigating cognitive models of creative practice and empathy, including biofeedback technology, Therapeutically Active Digital Medicine, Transcranial Magnetic Stimulation (TMS), and Somatic Enrichment. His advisors at Harvard were psychologist Kurt Fischer, philosopher Catherine Elgin, and former Ballet Frankfurt principal dancer Jill Johnson. While at Harvard, Ilya performed choreographies by Ohad Naharin, William Forsythe, Crystal Pite, Dwight Rhoden, Aszure Barton, Sidra Bell, Brian Brooks, among others.

Focusing on ethics in physical interaction through dance, Ilya completed a practice-based PhD funded by the Centre for Dance Research in the United Kingdom under Sarah Whatley, Scott Delahunta, and Sara Reed. Ilya is an Associate of the Signet Society for the Arts at Harvard, and a professional member of the Dance Studies Association and Association for Moral Education, among others. Ilya is the recipient of two Erasmus Fellowships (Bern, Switzerland and Berlin Germany), Derek Bok Fellowship in Literacy, Media, and Visualization (Harvard University), Laban Conservatoire Dance Research Fellowship (London, UK), Centre for Global Engagement Grant (Sapporo, Japan), Byron Fellowship, Live Arts Boston Grant (2019, 2021), and the Massachusetts Cultural Council Choreographic Fellowship.

Vidrin was selected as one of Dance Magazine's "25 to Watch" in 2022. He has been artist-in-residence at the New Museum, where he created "More or Less", an evening-length meditation on social ethics as part of year-long residency entitled "Everything You Do Matters, No Matter What You Do". He has also been artist-in-residence at Jacob's Pillow Dance Festival (2018, 2019, 2023, 2026), where he created "Proxies", an evening-length meditation on care and attention featuring custom-built wearable technology. He has also had residiences at MIT Media Lab, Interlochen Arts Academy, Davis Center at Harvard University, Harvard ArtLab, The Walnut Hill School, Museum of Fine Arts (Boston), Ballett Schwerin, North Atlantic Ballet, Newport Contemporary Ballet, and L.A. Contemporary Dance Company.

== Philosophy ==
Vidrin's philosophical work focuses on the concept of partnering. His writings distinguish between trust and care, for application within emerging technology and robotics, dance, and social life more broadly (see for example his essay on "Thresholds of Resistance).

== Works ==
- "Embodied Ethics: Conditions and Norms of Communication in Partnering" (Book Chapter), Cambridge Scholars Press, 2020.
- "We Need to Distinguish Trust and Care", Dance Magazine, 2021.
- "What Falling Robots Reveal about the Absurdity of Human Trust", (with Amy Laviers), Psych Magazine, 2021.
- "Conceptualizing Care in Partnering", Journal of Performance Research, 2023.
- "Responsible Knowing in Partnering", Performance Research Journal, 2024.
- "Tender Robotics: A Framework for Meaning-Making Through Emotional Investment" (Book Chapter), Routledge, 2026
- "What Gets Lost When the Body Becomes Data", Jacob's Pillow Dance Blog, 2026.
