= Lead and follow =

Roles in dance pairing

Balboa dancing. In this video, the male dancers are the leads and the female dancers the follows.

In some types of partner dance, lead and follow are designations for the two dancers' roles in a dance pairing. The leader is responsible for guiding the couple and initiating transitions to different dance steps and, in improvised dances, for choosing the dance steps to perform. The leader communicates choices to the follower, and directs the follower by means of subtle physical and visual signals, thereby allowing the pair to be smoothly coordinated.

The amount of direction given by the leader depends on several factors, including dance style, social context of the dance, and experience and personalities of the dancers. Traditionally, the male dance partner was the leader and the female dance partner was the follower. In the 21st century, it has become increasingly common to see partnerships that buck this dynamic, particularly in more socially progressive dance styles.

== Gender roles ==
Traditionally, the male dance partner is the leader and the female dance partner is the follower.

This is not always the case, and there have been changes to the strict gendering of partner dances in competition or performance contexts (see e.g. "Jack and Jack" dance contests). It is possible for an exchange of roles to occur one or more times during some styles of dance, where the leader becomes the follower and vice versa, such as in Schottische danced in the Madrid style. There also exist social dance forms that explicitly have a history of same-sex (e.g. tango) and role-crossing partnerships.

== Communication ==
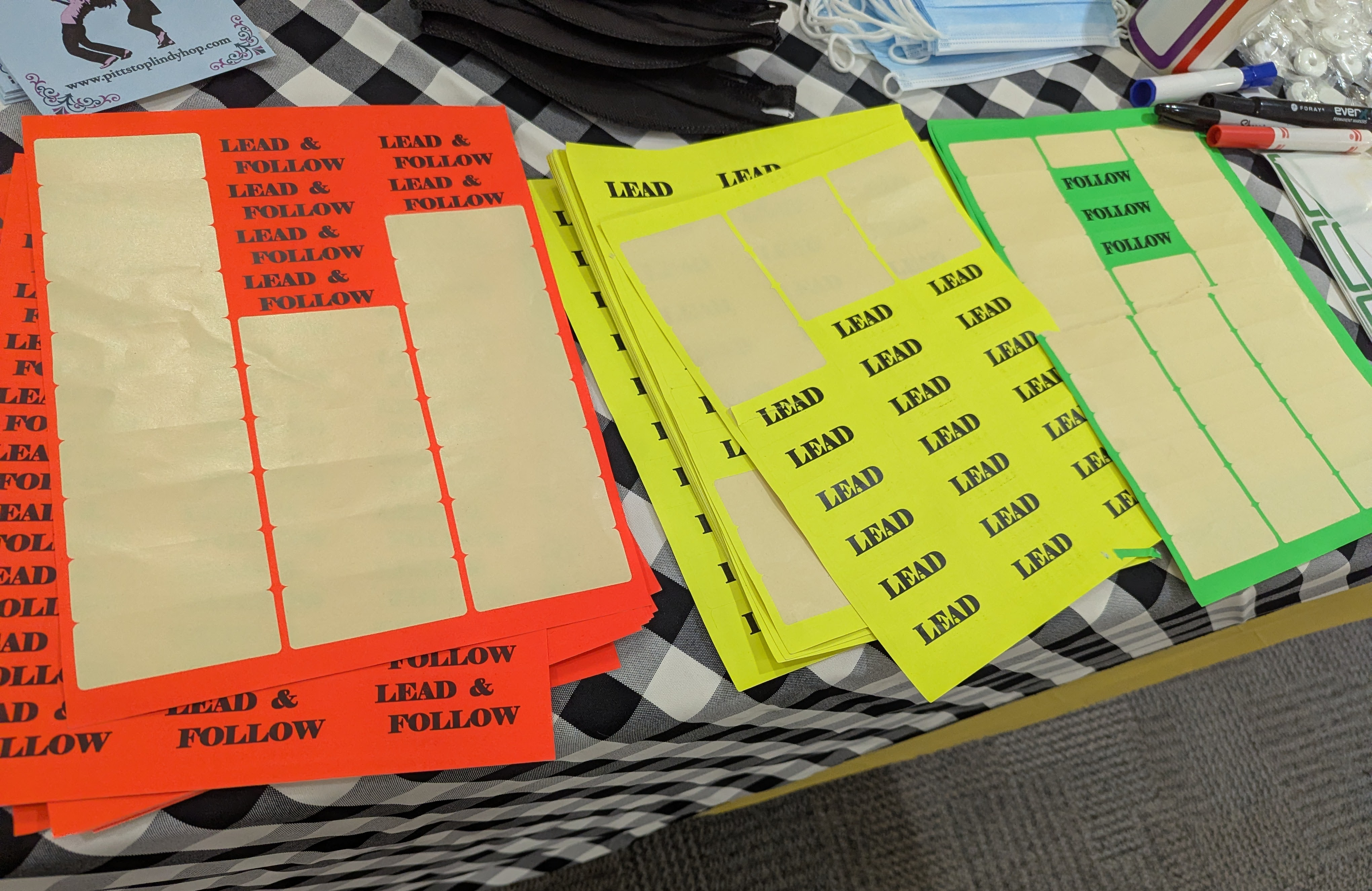
Stickers at a swing dance allowing attendees to indicate their preferred role(s).

Partner dancing requires awareness and clear communication; this is essential both for safety and for the overall success of the dance. If following in the dance, it helps to maintain a centered readiness to the leader. This helps the follower be ready for cues both visually and physically. The leader in the dance will best support the follower by giving clear directions.

For the leader and follower to interact with each other, communication needs to occur between the dance couple. Dancers take cues through physical connection, with the follower using it to communicate feedback to the leader just as the leader uses it to suggest moves to the follower. The most accomplished dancers use connection as a line of communication which allows the leader to incorporate the follower's ideas, abilities, and creative suggestions into their own styling and selection of moves.

In many partner dances, the leader's steps differ from the follower's. In face-to-face positions, the follower generally "mirrors" the leader's footwork. For example, if the leader begins on their left foot, the follower will begin on their right foot. In choreographed pieces and other situations where the follower is in a tandem position or shadow position, the leader and follower will use the same footwork. Usually both partners move together as a unit, but in some dances the partners move in opposite directions - together and apart again.

In partner dancing, dancers seek to work together to create synchronized or complementary movements. The leader is largely responsible for initiating movement, whereas the follower's role is to maintain this movement (though they may choose not to). This process can be described as involving the initiation of momentum or 'energy' (by the leader) and then the subsequent maintenance, exaggeration, decreasing or dissolving of this momentum by both partners. This momentum or energy may be manifested as movement (in its most obvious form), or in a range of more complex interactions between partners:

- Compression (where each partner 'compress' the energy by bending joints and moving towards or 'into' their partner, to varying degrees);
- Leverage (where one partner – usually the leader – exploits the development of compression or connection to shift their follower's weight or to 'ground' (develop 'compression' downwards, with the contact their feet make with the floor) themselves more thoroughly before initiating movement);
- Tension (is the opposite of compression - partners moving away from each other but still in contact)

It is also helpful for dancers to regard their partners in terms of their points of balance to help the leader initiate movements for their follower. These points of balance include the front-facing side of the shoulders, the front facing side of the hips, and the follower's center (the abdomen). If the leader wants to bring the follower close, the leader is to apply tension and draw the hand in and down toward the leader's own hip; to send the follower away, the leader would guide the hand toward the follower and add compression, signaling the move away.

=== Obstruction avoidance ===
A general rule is that both leader and follower watch each other's back in a dance hall situation. Collision avoidance is one of the cases when the follower is required to "backlead" or at least to communicate about the danger to the leader. In travelling dances, such as waltz, common follower signals of danger are an unusual resistance to the leader, or a slight tap by the shoulder. In open-position dances, such as swing or Latin dances, maintaining eye contact with the partner is an important safety communication link.

=== Weight transfer ===
For partner dancers, using weight transfers is a way for a leader to communicate a 'lead' for a dance step to a follower.

In another example, for a leader to have their follower walk forwards while connected, the leader begins by taking their center back, indicating a backward walking move. As the partners' arms/points of contact move away from each other, they develop tension, which the follower may either break by dropping their arms or breaking the hold, or 'follow' by moving.

A more experienced leader may realize (if only on an unconscious level) that the most effective execution of even this "simple" step is achieved by preparing for movement before the step begins.

The leader-follower connection facilitates this. The principles of leading and following are explored in contact improvisation of modern dance.

=== Recovery from miscommunication ===
Sometimes a miscommunication will occur between the leader and follower. Techniques of the recovery of connection and synchronization vary from dance to dance, but below are a few common examples.

- In dances without obligatory body contact (Latin, swing, hustle, American Smooth), free spin recovers from anything.
- In dances danced in body contact (waltz, tango, quickstep, foxtrot) it is very important to recover the feet match. To recover, leaders may initiate a well-known (i.e. basic) step with slightly exaggerated sideways shift of weight to force the follower to free the required foot. For example, in waltz or foxtrot one might end a measure in the open promenade position, as there would then be no doubt as to the direction of the movement and which foot to use at the beginning of the next measure.

== Lead ==
=== Methods to lead ===
- Body lead
- Arm lead

==== Body lead vs. arm lead ====
A body lead occurs where the leader initiates a lead by moving their body, which moves their arm(s), and thus transmits a lead to the follower. 'Body lead' means much the same as 'weight transfer'. An arm lead occurs where the leader moves their arm(s) without moving their body, or moves their body in a different direction to their arm. While an 'arm lead' without the transfer of weight (or movement of the body) on the part of the leader is often a marker of an inexperienced or poorly taught dancer, the process of leading and following, particularly at an advanced level, often involves the contrasting uses of weight transfers and 'arm moves'. As an example, a leader may lead a follower back onto their right foot through the leader's own weight transfer forwards onto their left foot; yet at the same time turn the follower's torso to the left from above the hips.

=== Techniques of leading ===
The leader has to communicate the direction of the movement to the follower. Traditionally, the leader's right hand is on the follower's back, near the lowest part of the shoulder-blade. This is the strongest part of the back and the leader can easily pull the follower's body inwards. To enable the leader to communicate a step forward (backward for the follower) the follower has to constantly put a little weight against the leader's right hand. When the leader goes forward, the follower will naturally go backwards.

An important leading mechanism is the leader's left hand, which usually holds the follower's right hand. At no point should it be necessary for any partner to firmly grab the other's hand. It is sufficient to press the hand or even only finger tips slightly against each other, the follower's hand following the leader's hand.

Another important leading mechanism is hip contact. Though not possible in traditional Latin dances like Rumba, Cha-cha, Tango Argentino because of partner separation, hip contact is a harmonious and sensual way of communicating movement to the partner, used primarily in Standard or Ballroom dances (English / slow waltz, European tango, quickstep etc.) and Caribbean dances.

== Follow ==
=== Types of follow ===
- Active follow
- Passive follow

=== Backleading ===
Backleading is when a follower is executing steps without waiting for, or contrary to the lead's lead. Both are considered bad dancing habits because it makes the follower difficult to lead and dance with.

Backleading can be a teaching tool that is often used intentionally by an instructor when dancing with a student lead, in order to help them learn the desired technique.

Backleading sounds similar to "hijacking", and indeed it is often used in place of "hijacking". However the two terms have significant differences, stemming from intentions. The first difference is superficial; hijacking is usually an occasional "outburst" from the follower, who otherwise diligently follows the lead, while a "backlead" may refer to a consistent habit. The second difference is more significant; hijacking is an actual reversal of roles, meaning that the hijacker leads the leader and takes control of the dance, while backleading only takes care of the follower.

=== Hijacking ===
Sometimes the follower steals the lead and the couple reverses roles for some time. This is called hijacking (also known as lead stealing). Hijacking requires experience and good connection, since without proper timing it may look like sloppy dancing. A signal for hijacking is typically an unusually changed (mostly, increased) stress in the connection from the follower's side. "Unusually" meaning more than typically required for the execution of the current step (by these partners). For a follower to hijack, they must be sure that the lead will understand or at least guess the follower's intentions.

== See also ==
- Glossary of partner dance terms
