= XS Latin =

UK formation dance team

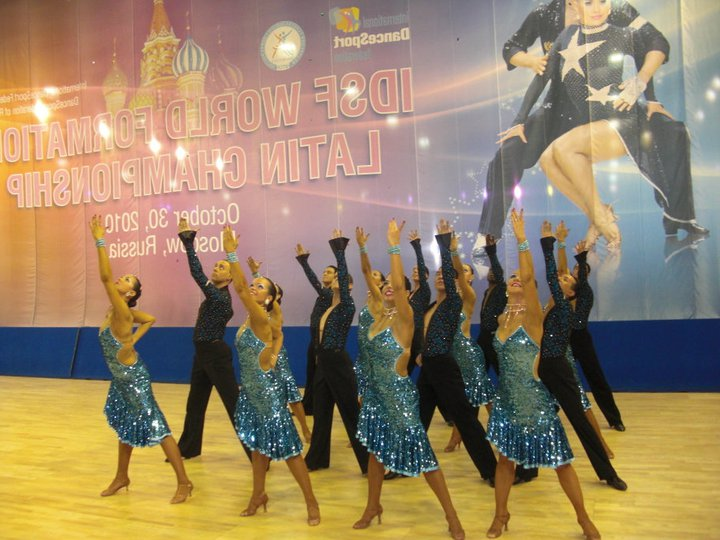
- Founded: 1997
- Location: Cambridgeshire
- Coaches: Head Coach: David Mallabone Assistant Coaches: Diane Williams, Jasmin Silver, Chi-Hé Elder
- Website: https://www.xslatin.com/

XS Latin is a formation dance team based in Cambridge, UK. They have three teams (A, B and C) and cater to all levels of dancers.The A team are ranked 1st in the UK and 9th in the World as a Latin Formation Team.

== Creation ==
XS Latin was formed in 1997 by eX Students of Cambridge University, many of whom started dancing in competitions run by the Inter Varsity Dance Association. They have represented the UK in WDSF World Latin Formation competitions since 2002.

The team continues to be based in the Cambridge area (practising in the nearby area of Milton, Waterbeach and Cambourne).

In 2011, XS Latin opened a B Team and in 2015, a C Team

== Routines and Results ==
Titles refer to themes and music that the routines were based around. Blackpool refers to competitions run as part of Blackpool Dance Festival (previously referred to British Open and British Closed). Blackpool acts as the national selection competition as only two English teams can be sent to the World Championships.

A Team
| Routine | Year | Coaches | Competition | Location | Result |
|---|---|---|---|---|---|
| Sarafina | 1998 | | British National Latin Formation Championships | Blackpool, United Kingdom | 4th |
| Sarafina | 1999 | | British National Latin Formation Championships | Blackpool, United Kingdom | 5th |
| Mystery | 2000 | | British National Latin Formation Championships | Blackpool, United Kingdom | 3rd |
| Mystery | 2001 | | British National Latin Formation Championships | Blackpool, United Kingdom | 4th |
| Moulin Rouge | 2002 | | British Open Latin Formation Championships | Blackpool, United Kingdom | 4th |
| Moulin Rouge | 2002 | | British National Latin Formation Championships | Blackpool, United Kingdom | 2nd |
| Moulin Rouge | 2002 | | IDSF World Latin Formation Championships | Vilnius, Lithuania | |
| Aladdin | 2003 | David Mallabone | British National Latin Formation Championships | Blackpool, United Kingdom | 2nd |
| Aladdin | 2003 | David Mallabone | IDSF World Latin Formation Championships | Essen, Germany | |
| Aladdin | 2004 | David Mallabone | British Open Latin Formation Championships | Blackpool, United Kingdom | |
| Aladdin | 2004 | David Mallabone | IDSF World Latin Formation Championships | Minsk, Belarus | |
| Tom Jones | 2005 | David Mallabone | British National Latin Formation Championships | Blackpool, United Kingdom | 1st |
| Tom Jones | 2005 | David Mallabone | British Open Latin Formation Championships | Blackpool, United Kingdom | 4th |
| Tom Jones | 2005 | David Mallabone | IDSF World Latin Formation Championships | Munich, Germany | |
| Song of South America | 2006 | David Mallabone | British National Latin Formation Championships | Blackpool, United Kingdom | 1st |
| Song of South America | 2006 | David Mallabone | IDSF World Latin Formation Championships | Bremen, Germany | |
| Song of South America | 2006 | David Mallabone | Donaupokal Invitational Latin Formation Competition | Vienna, Austria | |
| On Broadway | 2007 | David Mallabone | IDSF European Latin Formation Championships | Düsseldorf, Germany | |
| On Broadway | 2007 | David Mallabone | British Open Latin Formation Championships | Blackpool, United Kingdom | 4th |
| On Broadway | 2007 | David Mallabone | IDSF World Latin Formation Championships | Bremerhaven, Germany | |
| On Broadway | 2007 | David Mallabone | Donaupokal Invitational Competition | Vienna, Austria | |
| Night Fever | 2008 | David Mallabone | British National Latin Formation Championships | Blackpool, United Kingdom | 1st |
| Night Fever | 2008 | David Mallabone | ISDF World Latin Formation Championships | Wiener Neustadt, Austria | |
| Night Fever | 2009 | David Mallabone | British Open Latin Formation Championships | Blackpool, United Kingdom | 2nd |
| Night Fever | 2009 | David Mallabone | ISDF World Latin Formation Championships | Bremen, Germany | 13th |
| Priscilla, Queen of the Desert | 2010 | David Mallabone | British National Latin Formation Championships | Blackpool, United Kingdom | 1st |
| Priscilla, Queen of the Desert | 2010 | David Mallabone | ISDF World Latin Formation Championships | Moscow 2010 | 13th |
| Priscilla, Queen of the Desert | 2010 | David Mallabone | Donaupokal International Latin Formation Competition | Vienna, Austria | 4th |
| Priscilla, Queen of the Desert | 2011 | David Mallabone | British National Latin Formation Championships | Blackpool, United Kingdom | 1st |
| Priscilla, Queen of the Desert | 2011 | David Mallabone | British Open Latin Formation Championships | Blackpool, United Kingdom | 4th |
| Priscilla, Queen of the Desert | 2011 | David Mallabone | UK Latin Formation | | 1st |
| Bat out of Hell | 2012 | David Mallabone | UK Latin Formation | | 1st |
| Bat out of Hell | 2012 | David Mallabone | British Open Latin Formation Championships | Blackpool, United Kingdom | 3rd |
| Bat out of Hell | 2012 | David Mallabone | ISDF World Latin Formation Championships | Bremen, Germany | |
| Bat out of Hell | 2013 | David Mallabone | UK Latin Formation | | 1st |
| Bat out of Hell | 2013 | David Mallabone | British Open Latin Formation Championships | Blackpool, United Kingdom | 3rd |
| Bat out of Hell | 2013 | David Mallabone | British National Latin Formation Championships | Blackpool, United Kingdom | 1st |
| Bat out of Hell | 2013 | David Mallabone | WDSF European Championship | Vilnius, Lithuania | 14th |
| Bat out of Hell | 2013 | David Mallabone | WDSF World Championship | Bremen, Germany | 13th |
| The Girl from Tiger Bay | 2014 | David Mallabone | UK Latin Formation | | 1st |
| The Girl from Tiger Bay | 2014 | David Mallabone | British National Latin Formation Championships | Blackpool, United Kingdom | 2nd |
| The Girl from Tiger Bay | 2014 | David Mallabone | WDSF European Latin Formation Championships | Düren, Germany | 9th |
| The Girl from Tiger Bay | 2014 | David Mallabone | Donaupokal International Latin Formation Competition | | 3rd |
| The Girl from Tiger Bay | 2014 | David Mallabone | WDSF World Championship | Bremen, Germany | 14th |
| The Girl from Tiger Bay | 2015 | David Mallabone | UK Latin Formation | | 1st |
| The Girl from Tiger Bay | 2015 | David Mallabone | British National Latin Formation Championships | Blackpool, United Kingdom | 2nd |
| The Girl from Tiger Bay | 2015 | David Mallabone | Zala Open | | 2nd |
| The Girl from Tiger Bay | 2015 | David Mallabone | WDSF World Championship | Vienna, Austria | 14th |
| Wicked | 2016 | David Mallabone | UK Latin Formation | | 1st |
| Wicked | 2016 | David Mallabone | WDSF World Championship | Bremen, Germany | 13th |
| Wicked | 2017 | David Mallabone | UK Latin Formation | | 1st |
| Wicked | 2017 | David Mallabone | British Open Latin Formation Championships | Blackpool, United Kingdom | 1st |
| Wicked | 2017 | David Mallabone | British National Latin Formation Championships | Blackpool, United Kingdom | 1st |
| Wicked | 2017 | David Mallabone | WDSF World Championship | Vienna, Austria | 11th |
| Time | 2018 | David Mallabone Diane Williams | UK Latin Formation | | 1st |
| Time | 2018 | David Mallabone Diane Williams | British National Latin Formation Championships | Blackpool, United Kingdom | 1st |
| Time | 2018 | David Mallabone Diane Williams | WDSF European Championship | Kalisz, Poland | 11th |
| Time | 2019 | David Mallabone Diane Williams | UK Latin Formation | | 1st |
| Time | 2019 | David Mallabone Diane Williams | British National Latin Formation Championships | Blackpool, United Kingdom | 2nd |
| Time | 2019 | David Mallabone Diane Williams | British Open Latin Formation Championships | Blackpool, United Kingdom | 3rd |
| Time | 2019 | David Mallabone Diane Williams | WDC European Latin Formation | | 1st |
| Time | 2019 | David Mallabone Diane Williams | WDSF World Championship | Bremen, Germany | 12th |
| Boogie Wonderland | 2021 | David Mallabone Diane Williams | WDSF World Championship | Bremen, Germany | 11th |
| Boogie Wonderland | 2021 | David Mallabone Diane Williams | British Open Latin Formation Championships | Blackpool, United Kingdom | 2nd |
| Boogie Wonderland | 2021 | David Mallabone Diane Williams | British National Latin Formation Championships | Blackpool, United Kingdom | 2nd |
| Boogie Wonderland | 2022 | David Mallabone Diane Williams | WDSF European Championship | Schwechat/Vienna, Austria | 6th |
| Boogie Wonderland | 2022 | David Mallabone Diane Williams | British National Latin Formation Championships | Blackpool, United Kingdom | 1st |
| Boogie Wonderland | 2022 | David Mallabone Diane Williams | British Open Latin Formation Championships | Blackpool, United Kingdom | 2nd |
| Boogie Wonderland | 2022 | David Mallabone Diane Williams | WDSF World Championship | Braunschweig , Germany | 11th |
| Anthem | 2023 | David Mallabone Diane Williams | The Open Worlds | Blackpool, United Kingdom | 1st |
| Anthem | 2023 | David Mallabone Diane Williams | British Open Latin Formation Championships | Blackpool, United Kingdom | 4th |
| Anthem | 2023 | David Mallabone Diane Williams | British National Latin Formation Championships | Blackpool, United Kingdom | 1st |
| Anthem | 2024 | David Mallabone Diane Williams | British Open Latin Formation Championships | Blackpool, United Kingdom | 2nd |
| Anthem | 2024 | David Mallabone Diane Williams | British National Latin Formation Championships | Blackpool, United Kingdom | 1st |
| Anthem | 2024 | David Mallabone Diane Williams | WDSF World Championship | Schwechat/Vienna, Austria | 9th |
| Hamilton | 2025 | David Mallabone Diane Williams Jasmin Silver | Sparkasse Dance Trophy | Schwechat/Vienna, Austria | |
| Hamilton | 2025 | David Mallabone Diane Williams Jasmin Silver | British Open Latin Formation Championships | Blackpool, United Kingdom | 2nd |

B Team
| Routine | Year | Coaches | Competition | Location | Result |
|---|---|---|---|---|---|
| Cabaret | 2011 | David Mallabone | Donaupokal International Latin Formation Competition (2nd Div) | Vienna, Austria | |
| Cabaret | 2012 | David Mallabone | British Open Latin Formation Championships | Blackpool, United Kingdom | |
| Cabaret | 2012 | David Mallabone | British National Latin Formation Championships | Blackpool, United Kingdom | |
| Cabaret | 2012 | David Mallabone | UK Latin Formation Championships | | 2nd |
| Cabaret | 2012 | David Mallabone | Donaupokal International Latin Formation Competition (2nd Div) | Vienna, Austria | |
| Blues Brothers | 2013 | David Mallabone | WDSF European Championship | Vilnius, Lithuania | 16th |
| Blues Brothers | 2013 | David Mallabone | UK Latin Formation Championships | | 2nd |
| Blues Brothers | 2013 | David Mallabone | British Open Latin Formation Championships | Blackpool, United Kingdom | |
| Blues Brothers | 2013 | David Mallabone | WDSF World Championship | Bremen - Germany | 16th |
| Blues Brothers | 2014 | David Mallabone | UK Latin Formation Championships | | 2nd |
| Blues Brothers | 2014 | David Mallabone | British National Latin Formation Championships | Blackpool, United Kingdom | |
| Vogue | 2015 | David Mallabone | WDSF World Championship | Vienna, Austria | 19th |
| Vogue | 2015 | David Mallabone | UK Latin Formation Championships | | 2nd |
| The Planets | 2017 | David Mallabone | WDSF World Championship | Vienna, Austria | 18th |
| The Planets | 2017 | David Mallabone | WDC European | | 1st |
| The Planets | 2017 | David Mallabone | UK Latin Formation Championship | | 2nd |
| The Planets | 2017 | David Mallabone | British Open Latin Formation Championship | Blackpool, United Kingdom | 3rd |
| The Planets | 2017 | David Mallabone | British National Latin Formation Championships | Blackpool, United Kingdom | |
| The Planets | 2018 | David Mallabone Diane Williams | WDSF European Championship | Kalisz, Poland | 13th |
| The Planets | 2018 | David Mallabone Diane Williams | WDC European | | 1st |
| Conga | 2019 | David Mallabone Diane Williams | WDSF World Championship | Bremen, Germany | 19th |
| Conga | 2019 | David Mallabone Diane Williams | British National Latin Formation Championships | Blackpool, United Kingdom | 7th |
| Conga | 2019 | David Mallabone Diane Williams | British Open Latin Formation Championships | Blackpool, United Kingdom | 6th |
| Crazy | 2021 | David Mallabone Diane Williams | British Open Latin Formation Championships | Blackpool, United Kingdom | 3rd |
| Crazy | 2021 | David Mallabone Diane Williams | British National Latin Formation Championships | Blackpool, United Kingdom | 6th |
| Crazy | 2022 | David Mallabone Diane Williams | WDSF World Championship | Braunschweig , Germany | 13th |
| Crazy | 2022 | David Mallabone Diane Williams | British Open Latin Formation Championships | Blackpool, United Kingdom | 4th |
| Crazy | 2022 | David Mallabone Diane Williams | British National Latin Formation Championships | Blackpool, United Kingdom | 6th |
| Dreamgirls | 2023 | David Mallabone Diane Williams | The Open Worlds | Blackpool, United Kingdom | 2nd |
| Dreamgirls | 2023 | David Mallabone Diane Williams | British Open Latin Formation Championships | Blackpool, United Kingdom | 7th |
| Dreamgirls | 2023 | David Mallabone Diane Williams | British National Latin Formation Championships | Blackpool, United Kingdom | 5th |
| Dreamgirls | 2024 | David Mallabone Diane Williams | The Open Worlds | Blackpool, United Kingdom | 1st |
| Dreamgirls | 2024 | David Mallabone Diane Williams | British Open Latin Formation Championships | Blackpool, United Kingdom | 4th |
| Dreamgirls | 2024 | David Mallabone Diane Williams Jasmin Silver | British National Latin Formation Championships | Blackpool, United Kingdom | 9th |
| Cuba | 2025 | David Mallabone Diane Williams Jasmin Silver | The Open Worlds | Blackpool, United Kingdom | 1st |
| Cuba | 2025 | David Mallabone Diane Williams Jasmin Silver | British Open Latin Formation Championships | Blackpool, United Kingdom | 4th |

C Team
| Routine | Year | Coaches | Competition | Location | Result |
|---|---|---|---|---|---|
| Toccata | 2016 | David Mallabone | UK Latin Formation Championshipa | | 3rd |
| Rio | 2017 | David Mallabone | British National Latin Formation Championships | Blackpool, United Kingdom | |
| Rio | 2018 | David Mallabone Diane Williams | British Open Latin Formation Championships | Blackpool, United Kingdom | |
| Rio | 2018 | David Mallabone Diane Williams | Impress Latin Formation Competition | Holland | |
| Rio | 2018 | David Mallabone Diane Williams | WDC European Championships | | 2nd |
| Rocketman | 2019 | David Mallabone Diane Williams | British National Latin Formation Championships | Blackpool, United Kingdom | 9th |
| Rocketman | 2019 | David Mallabone Diane Williams | British Open Latin Formation Championships | Blackpool, United Kingdom | 7th |
| I Write The Songs | 2022 | David Mallabone Diane Williams | British Open Latin Formation Championships | Blackpool, United Kingdom | 5th |
| I Write The Songs | 2022 | David Mallabone Diane Williams | British National Latin Formation Championships | Blackpool, United Kingdom | 11th |
| Magic | 2023 | David Mallabone Diane Williams | British Open Latin Formation Championships | Blackpool, United Kingdom | 8th |
| Magic | 2023 | David Mallabone Diane Williams | British National Latin Formation Championships | Blackpool, United Kingdom | 10th |
| Magic | 2024 | David Mallabone Diane Williams | British Open Latin Formation Championships | Blackpool, United Kingdom | 5th |
| Magic | 2024 | David Mallabone Diane Williams Jasmin Silver | British National Latin Formation Championships | Blackpool, United Kingdom | 11th |
| Fire | 2025 | David Mallabone Chi-Hé Elder Diane Williams Jasmin Silver | British Open Latin Formation Championships | Blackpool, United Kingdom | 5th |

== Current activities ==
They dance a six-minute routine that incorporates the five Latin dances - Cha Cha, Jive, Paso Doble, Samba and Rumba - as well as tricks, lifts and free-form choreography. They are trained by David Mallabone and compete both nationally and internationally.

XS Latin won the British National Championships in 2005, 2006, 2008, 2010, and 2011. They were placed 14th in the World Formation Championships Nov 2008, 13th in the 2010 World Formation Championships in Moscow In 2010 they finished 4th in the Donaupokal Formation International.

Besides competitions XS Latin also give demonstrations and promote formation dance at several open house events.

== See also ==
- Ballroom dance
- Competitive dance
- Formation dance
- List of DanceSport dances
- WDSF World Formation Latin Championships
