= Swedish Dancesport Federation =

Sports governing body in Sweden

Swedish Dancesport Federation (DSF) administers all dancesport in Sweden. The association was formed on February 25, 1968, and is one of 68 different sports federations in Sweden. DSF became a member of the Swedish Sports Confederation (RF) in 1977, which administers all sports in Sweden. Apart from this membership Swedish Dancesport Federation also is a member of the International Dancesport Federation (IDSF) from June 19, 2011, known as the World DanceSport Federation (WDSF) and the World Rock'n'Roll Confederation (WRRC). The office lies in Farsta, Stockholm.

== Overview ==
Swedish Dancesport Federation covers approximately 38,500 members in 156 associated danceclubs (2008), from Kiruna in the very north of Sweden to Malmö in the south.

Swedish Dancesport Federation is divided into 9 regions. These regional dancesport federations are more often called districts.

The presidium is selected from the annual general meeting. The presidium comprises the federation's chairman and six general members, and three deputies selected from the annual meeting. In order to support the activities, the organisation is divided in different committees, whose members are elected by the presidium. These committees are; Dance BRR (Bugg and Rock'n'Roll dances), Dance Tendance, Information-PR, Youth, Jurisprudence, District-Central Projects and Line Dance.

Dancesport within the association is divided in three dance categories. Namely Ballroom dancing (Tendance), Swing dances or as called in Sweden Bugg and Rock'n' Roll dances (in short terms just BRR dances) besides Line dance. Ballroom covers five Latin dances (Cha-Cha-Cha, Samba, Rumba, Paso Doble and Jive), and five Standard dances (Slow Waltz, Tango, Slow Foxtrot, Viennese Waltz and Quickstep). BRR dances covers Bugg, Double bugg, Lindy Hop (Jitterbug), Boogie Woogie and Rock'n'Roll dance.

The danceclubs, associated to Swedish Dancesport Federation, arranges each year approximately 75-100 dance competitions around Sweden. In order to see dance competitions one can view the eventcalendar on the Swedish Dancesport Federation's webpage. The dance couples is divided into several age groups (children, youth, junior, main and senior), and in different classes (A, B, C, D, and E), where A is the highest level (elite). On dance competitions in Sweden all ages and a majority of the classes often occur. Common is however, that dance competitions are separate for Line dance, Ballroom dances and BRR-dances. District championships and Swedish championships are arranged annually in all dances, as well as Swedish Championships for danceclubs (teams).

International dance competitions like Nordic championships is also arranged annually between the Nordic countries, beside European championships and World championships in all dancesport styles, where Sweden are represented by the national team in BRR dances and the national team in Tendance. National team in Line dance is not yet appointed. One annually reappeared world ranking competition, Gothenburg International, with top-ranked dance couples participating from all over the world in Ballroom dance and Latin, is also arranged in Sweden.

== Styles ==
The Swedish Dancesport Federation administers the following dance styles:

- BRR - Lindy Hop, Boogie Woogie, Rock'n'Roll, Bugg, Double bugg
- Ballroom (Tendance) - Latin, Standard
- Line dance
- Formation dance

== See also ==
- World Rock 'n' Roll Confederation
- IDSF/WDSF
- List of dancesport dances
