= WDSF European Formation Latin Championship =

The WDSF European Formation Latin Championship is the main annual formation International Latin dancesport championship in Europe.

== Summary of championships ==
Year	City	Country	Date	Venue	No. of Teams	Winners
1998	Budapest	Hungary				
1999	Gomel	Belarus				(Lithuania) Žuvėdra
2000	Ostrava	Czech Republic	10 June	Culture and Sports Palace Vitkovic		
2001	Békéscsaba	Hungary	29 September			(Lithuania) Žuvėdra
2002	's-Hertogenbosch	Netherlands	6 June			
2003	Ústí nad Labem	Czech Republic	1 November			(Lithuania) Žuvėdra
2004	Bremen	Germany				(Lithuania) Žuvėdra
2005	Bremen	Germany				(Lithuania) Žuvėdra
2006	Vilnius	Lithuania		Siemens Arena		(Lithuania) Žuvėdra
2007	Düsseldorf	Germany				
2008	Essen	Germany				
2009	Vilnius	Lithuania		Siemens Arena		(Lithuania) Žuvėdra
2010	Bremen	Germany				(Germany) Grun-Gold-Club
2012	Vienna	Austria				(Lithuania) Žuvėdra
2013	Vilnius	Lithuania	18 May	Siemens Arena	16	(Lithuania) Žuvėdra
