= World Rock'n'Roll Confederation =

Organization for Rock and Roll dancesport federations

- Formation: 1974 (1984 as WRRC)
- Type: International sport federation
- Headquarters: Neuhausen am Rheinfall, Switzerland
- Members: 34 National Member Federations
- President: Miriam Kerpan Izak
- Website: https://www.wrrc.dance

World Rock'n'Roll Confederation (WRRC) was registered in 1984, although its history traces to 1974. It is an umbrella organization for national professional and amateur Rock and Roll dancesport federations. Its statute that it "aims at promoting the physical training of its members by means of sporting activities in the form of Rock'n'Roll dance tournaments, including the acrobatic variations (acrobatic rock'n'roll) as well as Rock'n'Roll and Boogie Woogie, Lindy Hop, Formation and alternative styles in line with the rules and sporting presentations". The registered office is in Neuhausen am Rheinfall, canton of Schaffhausen, Switzerland.

The WRRC is an associated member of the World DanceSport Federation WDSF and via WDSF connected to Sport Accord and the International Olympic Committee IOC and sports forum of the European Union.

== History ==
In 1974, Italy, France, Germany and Switzerland founded the European Rock'n'Roll Association (ERRA). It was later joined by Austria, Netherlands, Denmark, and Sweden. When Canada joined the association it was renamed into the World Rock'n'Roll Association (WRRA). In 1984, the WRRC was created by merging the WRRA and Fédération Mondial de Dance de Jazz (FMDJ, World Federation of Jazz Dance). In 1995, it was granted the provisional recognition of the IOC.

As of 2011, the following nations are members of the WRRC: France, Netherlands, Switzerland, Armenia, Austria, Germany, Belgium, Slovenia, Bulgaria, Canada, Italy, Sweden, Finland, Lebanon, Liechtenstein, Luxembourg, Hungary, Denmark, Czech Republic, Slovakia, Poland, Russia, Croatia, Latvia, Norway, Spain, San Marino, Ukraine, Australia, Greece, United States, Mexico, Singapore, Great Britain, Bosnia-Herzegovina, Estonia.

== Organization ==
The World Rock'n'Roll Confederation organization consists of the Presidium consisting of the President, Vice President, Treasurer, Sports Director and the General Secretary. The Presidium is elected by the General Meeting held in March every year. To the aid of the Presidium there are different commissions or commissioners who act as the Presidium's expert advisers concerning rules and judges training among other things. As of current there are commissioners for Lindy Hop, Boogie Woogie, Formations and a Medical Commissioner.

The WRRC General Meeting gives the Presidium its instructions to work with and decides in which direction the federation should go. These decisions are made by majority vote. However the Presidium has a certain amount of freedom to act on its own concerning for example minor changes of rules. The Official language of the WRRC is English.

== Competitions ==
The WRRC organizes several different competitions each year. Together with national and local organizations the WRRC conducts World Cup events, World and European Championships. The

Competition classes:

- Rock and Roll (dance) - Main Class Free Style, Main Class Contact Style, Junior, Juveniles and Children
- Lindy Hop - Main Class and Juniors
- Boogie Woogie - Main Class and Juniors
- Bugg - Main Class and Juniors
- Double bugg - Main Class and Juniors
- Formation - Main Class Juniors and Ladies

== Anti-doping ==
As well as other sport federations the WRRC continuously works with Anti-Doping and follows the recommendations and rules of the World Anti-Doping Agency and since the WRRC are members of the IDSF their rules and codes apply also for the WRRC. Today all cases of suspected usage of illegal substances are handled by the IDSF Disciplinary Counsel. All participators of WRRC and IDSF competitions are required to sign a form of consent that you agree to the terms of the Anti-Doping code, if not signed or refusal to sign, you may not participate.

== See also ==
- WDSF
- IOC
- WADA
- SportAccord
