= Soviet ballroom dances =

Soviet ballroom dance was a category of ballroom dance competitions in the former Soviet Union. Competitions in Ballroom dancing in the USSR were held in three dance categories: Standard dances, Latin dances, and Soviet dances ("Советская программа").

== Soviet category ==
The Soviet category comprised Polka, Rylio, Varu-Varu, Sudarushka, Russian Lyrical (Russian: Полька, Рилио (Рилё), Вару-Вару, Сударушка, Русский лирический)

With the exception of Polka, these dances were choreographed basing on some folk dances of Soviet republics.

- Rylio, of Lithuanian origin, created by Skaistė Idzelevičienė, the leader of the Lithuanian ballroom formation team Žuvėdra.
- Varu-Varu (translated as "I can, I can"), of Latvian origin.
- Sudarushka (loosely translated as "sweetheart"), of Russian origin, and
- Russian Lyrical.

The former three are "fast" or "rhythmic" dances, the latter two are "slow" or "lyrical" ones.

All of them had distinctive basic techniques. The meter was 2/4 or 4/4 for all of them. The hold was either open or loose, without body contact. Polka had the tightest hold. Polka, Sudarushka and Russian Lyrical were progressive dances, i.e., moving along the line of dance. Rylio and Varu-Varu were of "stationary" type.

Today the category is obsolete, but the dances themselves survived, moved back to the category of folk dances. At some dance events, such as "Neva Cup" (Невский кубок) in St. Petersburg, balls of Esta-Mephi club, Moscow, or "Russian Formation Cup-2007" held in Tyumen these dances comprise the competition category of "Homeland Dances" (Отечественные танцы).

=== Some basic step-rhythm patterns ===
The count cues could be any of 12345678, 12341234, 1&2&3&4& or 1&2&1&2&.

==== Rylio ====
In-place basic:
Double hand hold in various positions, e.g., sidewise-forward on the shoulder level, elbows bent down.
Steps of partners are mirrored.
1-2, 3-4, 5-6-7-8: tap-step, tap-step, step-step-step-step.

All steps/taps are in place, with slight one-foot skipping action. Author - choreographer - Adomas Gineitis

==== Varu-Varu ====
The dance is based on simple steps and jumpy movements created in 1950s in Latvia. It may be danced with any in 4/4 time disco music.

In-place basic:
Double hand hold, waist level.
Partners start with the same foot and go in a small circle, first in one direction, then in the opposite one.
1-2-3-4, 5-6-7-8: side-together-side-heel, side-together-side-heel
Skips: (12),(34),5,6,(78) (or slow-slow-quick-quick-slow): skip...skip...skip-skip-skip. A skip is from one foot to another, the freed foot pointing forward, toe on the floor.

==== Sudarushka ====
The dance is based on Russian khorovod dances. the dance is of vivid and light character, of medium to faster tempo in 2/4 time.

Triple-Step Basic Walks:
Right-to-left handhold, Free hands are on the waist.
Steps are mirrored, along the line of dance.
1-2-3-4, 5-6-7-8: step-step-step-tap, step-step-step-tap.
Tap is toe beside the support foot.
Initially the partners face each other. During the first triple step they "fan out" away from each other, free arms fanning sidewise. During the second triple partners "fan in", back to facing each other, free hands back on the waist.

==== Russian Lyrical ====
The dance is based on Russian folk tunes. It has a soft and smooth character, danced at medium tempo in 2/4 or 4/4 time.

Starts in shadow position, man's right hand on lady's waist, left arms linked pointing left diagonal.
Most walks are based on "Russian triple step": step-step-step-hold. It can be performed forward, backward, with turn on any step.

The recommended tunes are "Русский лирический" (Russian Lyrical) or "Подмосковные вечера" (Moscow Nights)

== Other Soviet ballroom ==
Ballroom dance manuals of Soviet times list quite a few other Soviet dances promoted to counter the influence of the "Western way of life", created basing on folk dances of the peoples of the Soviet Union and Soviet Bloc:

- Tuyana / Туяна (Buryat origin)
- Yatranochka / Ятраночка (Ukrainian, "A Girl from the Yatran River"); choreographed by the Ukrainian ballroom dance troupe Konvaliya in 1971
- Slavutyanochka / Славутянка (Ukrainian, "A Girl from Slavutych")
- Gutsulka / Гуцулка (Ukrainian, "Hutsul Woman")
- Jooksupolka / Йоксу-полька (Estonian)
- Transcarpathian Ballroom / Закарпатский бальный (Ukrainian)
- Kazakh Ballroom / Казахский бальный (Kazakh)
- Figure Waltz / Фигурный вальс
- Vesyalaya Hora / Веселая хора (Moldavian)
- "Разрешите пригласить"
- "Skaters" / "Конькобежцы"
