= Fusku =

Finnish rock'n' swing partner dance developed from jive

Fusku, also known as stage jive, is a rock and swing dance popular in Finland.

== Description ==
By origin, it evolved from modern jive and is performed to the rhythm and music of the foxtrot, especially on dance floors. Sometimes it is considered a variation of single-time swing, although its steps are different, and can also be performed to swing music.

It is a dance that, due to the relative ease of the steps, is suitable for beginners, while at the same time having enough patterns and possibilities to remain interesting for more experienced dancers.

Fusku is danced as a couple dance, mostly in an open grip. The rhythm of the fusku step is the same as that of the foxtrot: slow, slow, quick, quick; however, in fusku, the quick steps are performed as a step back, or the so-called rock step. The knees and ankles are bent with each step.

Fusku is also suitable for dancing to fast songs where more complex dance styles would have reached their limits. Fuscu can be danced to any four-part music, and people can often be seen on stage dancing faster foxtrots with fuscu or bugg movements.

Fusku can use the same movements as jive and other rock and swing dances.

Fusku is danced both as a social dance and as a competitive dance. In Finland, fusku is often taught in clubs specializing in rock and swing dancing.
