= DC Mara =

Dance club in Belarus

The Dance Club Mara (Belarusian: Мара, literally: "dream", in the meaning "hope") is a ballroom dance club in Belarus with the official IDSF formation team representing Belarus in IDSF world ranking competitions. The dance club itself was created in 1965. The first competition of the team was in 1991. The team manager is Lydia Kats-Lazareva. The team competes both in Standard and Latin categories. As of 2013 the highest achievement for the team in World and Europe championship was finals, with the second place at the Austrian Open Championship in 2008.

The Palace of Culture of Minsk Tractor Plant hosts the club.
