= Modern Jive =

Dance style

- Year: 1980
- Related dances: swing Lindy Hop rock and roll salsa

Modern Jive is a dance style derived from swing, Lindy Hop, rock and roll, salsa and various other dance styles, the main difference being the simplification of footwork by removing syncopation such as chassé. The term "French Jive" is occasionally used instead, reflecting the origins of the style, as is the term "Smooth Jive". The word "modern" distinguishes it from ballroom Jive.

== History ==
Modern Jive was developed in the United Kingdom during the 1980s at three London clubs: Ceroc, LeRoc, and Cosmopolitan Jive. The style was based on a type of Jive that evolved in France after World War II when American dances such as the jitterbug were popular due to the presence of the American military.

Modern Jive was not created in France, but its origin owes something to the French version of Le Bop. The dance commonly known as Modern Jive is different from Le Bop, a high tempo dance. Michel Ange Lau played a major role in the change from Le Bop to Modern Jive at a club called Centre Charles Peguy). Two British people, James Cronin and Christine Keeble, saw Le Bop in France and wanted to learn the dance when they returned to London. They were among Lau's students. The style of music played at discos was changing, and high tempo dances like Rock and Roll and Le Bop were becoming less popular.

The change in music prompted the birth of Modern Jive; in 1980 Lau and the Le Bop dancers changed the timing of Le Bop, causing a revolution in the dance. This change in timing not only allowed Lau and his students to dance to a much larger variety of music but also to create more intricate moves.

== What is Modern Jive? ==
Modern Jive adapts moves from other dance styles such as West Coast Swing, Salsa, Ballroom and Latin. The key to understanding Modern Jive is the beginner moves. These 60-plus moves continually reinforce the absolutes to the dance. The consistencies allow modern jive dancers to dance together, despite their preferences.

== Modern Jive absolutes and consistencies ==
Due to Modern Jive's unique timing it has the ability to be danced to a wide variety of tempos (extremes 60bpm - 180bpm, typically 110bpm - 140bpm, although this varies considerably with geography), and the dance is generally danced to 2 beats in 4. It's danced to the stressed beats 1, 3, 5, & 7; it's on these beats the dancers are in position (moving through the less-stressed beats 2, 4, 6, & 8), e.g. a classical Yo Yo has 8 positions danced to 16 beats of music.

The step back at the start of each move: this was derived from the Rock Step and changed to a simple step back when the timing changed. The step back creates the in & out or concertina motion that many people consider to be an essential part of the dance style; both dancers step away from each other at the start of a move / pattern, to achieve tension and compression/extension in the connection point. This extension assists lead and follow technique, but perhaps more importantly the step back into extension is the consistent part that allows an infinite number of moves to be joined in any order, depending on which handhold or other connection the lead is using.

The follow's right hand is key to the dance, each beginner move starts with the follow's right hand (sometimes both hands), whenever the follow spins or the hand is released it's the right hand that they need to offer.

The motion of the dance: for the majority of the beginner moves the follow steps in to the lead's right side on count two (this is not always consistent at intermediate level moves, and the lead often signals with their right hand behind their back to bring the follow down the left side) e.g. Pretzel. (A lead technique can also be developed to bring the follow down the left hand side).

Off phrase dancing: Modern Jive is an 'off phrase' dance. This means a move does not always have to start on a particular beat e.g. beat 1 or beat 2 (Cha Cha) of the music – this allows the massive flexibility, diversity, and high level of musicality that's often seen in the dance. Moves often have varying numbers of beats to them, e.g. Catapult 8 counts (16 beats of music), Octopus 7 counts (14 beats of music).

== Modern Jive popular variants ==
=== Dancing to slower tempos ===
Slower tempos in Modern Jive (in some groups referred to as Modern Jive Blues) allows for more styling and musical interpretation. The slower tempo allows the follower to indicate when they want freestyle time, the dance can also use body leads at slower tempos and dancers often dance a lot closer. Dancing to slower music allows for a lot more two way communication, allowing more freedom, and music interpretation, however good Modern Jive dancers should be able to adapt their dancing and dance to a full spectrum of tempos. At higher tempos timing becomes more of a skill, where two way communication is reduced, at higher tempos musicality (e.g. hitting the music phrasing / breaks and interpreting the music), is more difficult to achieve as both dancers have to be in tune together but also with the music. Most dancers dancing Modern Jive Blues originate from Modern Jive and are familiar with Modern Jive Beginners moves and associated absolutes.

=== Rotating slot ===
In the classical form, Modern Jive naturally rotates (normally clockwise). This is due to 2 or 3 consistencies that can be seen in the beginner moves and more often than not in the intermediate moves. a) the follow continually steps into the leads right side, causing a clockwise rotation – rarely to the leads left side, b) Often on count three the follow is turned or spun clockwise (1st move basic, Yo Yo, Hatchback.....), c) a lot of the beginner moves finish with an anti clockwise return – causing the follow to stabilise on the left foot stepping slightly to her left (clockwise), instead of directly back. This is Modern Jive danced in its natural form, and should not be confused with a really bad technique where the follow continually skips around the lead (also known as 'Roundy Roundy' in the UK), despite his lead. This 'Roundy Roundy' style is often found at higher tempos by inexperienced follow dancers and is totally different from the slightly rotating slot (of the natural dance).

=== Slotted dancing ===
Over roughly the last decade, Modern Jive has been influenced by West Coast Swing, an American partner dance developed from Lindy Hop with the addition of the 'slot' meaning it is danced up and down an imaginary line. As WCS teaching tends to be more technique focused, it tends to attract experienced dancers from Modern Jive, who then bring elements of the dance back into M-J. The slot concept is one that has taken a hold in Modern Jive and is now very often taught even from beginner level, although more commonly in the Ceroc franchise venues and other groups that run competitions, than independents such as LeRoc.

Dancing slotted allows the follow (and lead) to always complete a full turn, which helps to avoid dizziness, and has many other technical advantages. However, some dancers find that at high tempos (140BPM and above) it is easier to abandon the slot and revert to a rotational style. These dancers find that many of the older Modern Jive moves done in the classical form, such as the YoYo, the Catapult and the Push Spin work better at higher tempos, and are less suitable for slow tempos (100BPM or lower) where other moves and a more elastic style of dancing are more appropriate.

When Modern Jive tends to be danced rotationally, it is still often taught on stage in two directions, to allow large classes to observe the instruction and instructors often compensate to be seen. In these classes, directional leads are often not taught effectively at beginner level (even at intermediate level), and so as soon as the class goes to freestyle dancing the dancers start to rotate in a rotating slot style. For these groups, dancing in the slot is an advanced technique / preference that can be developed and adds another dimension to Modern Jive, and it also looks impressive when a group of dancers are dancing slotted in the same area in the same direction.

Where Modern Jive tends to be danced slotted by default, slotted dancing tends to be taught rather more effectively, and it's reinforced in social dancing where it is possible to pack many more people onto a dance floor more safely if they are all dancing slotted. These groups have also tended to modify older moves slightly from the classical form, in order to take advantage of the known direction of momentum and other technical advantages of the slotted form.

=== Presenting forward / blocking ===
Presenting forward is a skill often developed by professionals, competition dancers and showcase dancers and requires further skills and additional techniques. Here the dancers develop the skill of presenting in one consistent direction (usually forward or towards an audience as compared to facing each other). Dips, drops, poses, exiting moves / lifts and even smiling consistently in one direction in order to present the best possible picture to spectators, judges and/or audiences are all factors.

== Branding ==
The term Modern Jive was coined in 1990 by Christine Keeble on a program called 'How to Jive', designed to promulgate this new style of jive. At that time the dance was known variously as Ceroc, LeRoc, or French Jive. Christine Keeble used the term 'modern jive' to encompass all of these names.

The term 'modern jive' was adopted, despite the absence of chasse or triple step (typical of "real" jive forms). Various clubs used the umbrella term as the dance spread out from its two earliest centres of London and Bristol and it later became accepted as a generic term for the dance. It is now used by a large number of independent teachers across the UK and internationally. It is also used by many of the franchise operators, although these companies often still prefer to use their own branding.

== Organizations ==
In the English-speaking world, Modern Jive classes and events are often franchised or run under various brand names, including, Jive Addiction, Blitz, DanceJive, ViBe Dance Nights, "Revolution Dance" Northwest, Ceroc, LeRoc, Just Jivin', Ginger Jive, Mo'Jive, Cloud9, Jiveasy, South Coast Modern Jive, The Thing, in New Zealand under Move Dance Ltd and others. Beyond the bounds of the English-speaking world, modern jive has still to make a significant impact. In Europe there are PARTYdanceSTYLE in Poland, M-Jive and Jive.Berlin in Germany and Leroc Zürich and Modern Jive Zürich in Switzerland which are slowly bringing the dance style to a wider audience.

Following a different but similar evolutionary path, dance styles such as Discofox (in Germany and Switzerland and derived from Foxtrott) and Bugg (found in Sweden) may sometimes be indistinguishable from the Modern Jive found in the UK and elsewhere in Europe.

== Dance moves ==
While these forms of Modern Jive have Swing and Rock-and-Roll dance moves in common, moves from many forms of dance including Salsa and Tango may be included, according to the specific franchise or even the particular dance teacher. Because of its eclectic nature there are hundreds of moves and variations that can be learnt, introduced or adapted.

Although dance routines are developed and rehearsed for competitions, Modern Jive is most frequently danced freestyle, providing additional challenges to more advanced dancers in terms of musical interpretation and expression; which is why some Modern Jive dancers prefer Blues Music, drawing out the move and allowing the follow to improvise and partake in the dance (as opposed to being dragged around the floor).

=== Move naming ===
Different franchises or teachers often have different names for identical moves, and different signals to indicate the next move. The Man's Spin taught at one venue may be identical to the Man's Pass taught by a different venue. Due to its origins, Modern Jive moves may be similar to moves from other dance styles; the First Move Triple Steps in Modern Jive is similar to the Lindy Hop Jockey, for example. Despite this there is rarely a problem dancing with people who have been taught other styles, at least with the less advanced moves. A solid lead is better than using a signal (which may only be suited to one dance style); thus allowing good follows to dance regardless of the learning style.

=== Lead variations ===
Like many Western partner dances, Modern Jive is most often a male-led dance. The gender of the lead is irrelevant to the technique required, however many moves are more easily led by a taller lead on a shorter follow, and thus a shorter lead will need to modify their lead and the move to allow for the differences in angle, or choose different moves that are more easily led by them.

Modern Jive is also occasionally danced by three dancers, with one lead and two followers (a variant known as "Double Trouble" in the UK or "Triples" in Australia/New Zealand).

It can also be danced with two leads smoothly and continuously swapping with each other to dance with one follow, or two follows doing the same with one lead (known in the UK as "Tag", and in Australia/New Zealand as "Swaps 'n' Steals")

=== Step footwork vs rock footwork ===
Many of the Australian offshoots of Ceroc transitioned to a footwork coined "Step" in about 1995.

The original "rock" footwork specifies a step back with either foot, transferring the weight to the moved foot on each of the odd numbered beats (1, 3, 5, 7) The moved foot is returned to its starting position on the even beats. (2, 4, 6, 8).

"Step" footwork specifies that the leader takes a step back with the right foot on the half beat or "and" count and "closes", stepping backwards with the left foot on the numbered count. "closing" implies that the feet end up close together. On the next count the leader steps forward with their right foot on the "and" count and closes with their left on the numbered count. The follower mirrors this by stepping back on their left and "closing" with their right and then stepping forward with their left and closing with their right.

Rock footwork was originally offered as a "beginner" footwork in Australia. More recently it has been dropped. The reason for it being dropped is pedagogical. The problem appeared to be that the transition from beginner to intermediate dancer (so-called) meant one had to "unlearn" one and then "re-learn" another rhythm and weight change components of the dance. Unfortunately, the "rock" footwork is actually more suited to fast music (leaning towards "advanced" dancers) as it reduces the number of weight changes required during any rhythm unit. Thus, the preference for "step" footwork has reduced the "terminal velocity" modern jive can be danced at - because it forces a weight change every beat.

== Music ==
Modern Jive is generally danced to music with four beats to the bar (Quadruple or Common time), from latest chart hits to big band music and everything between, in a wide variety of tempos from slow to very fast. Some teachers or franchises may concentrate on particular musical styles, such as swing. Move Dance (NZ), for example, focuses on a fusion of rock n roll and salsa, catering to a target age group of 40–70. Music is typically between 108 and 160 bpm. Experienced jivers occasionally dance to music outside those broad constraints.

== Weekenders ==
Around the world there are a number of "weekenders" (short dance-focused holidays, typically running from Friday - Monday) running annually.

Jive Time originally started weekenders in the UK but now Ceroc run the majority of the weekenders; with independent organisers still running a number of other weekender events, such as the Jive Addiction, Jive Time or MJ Roc events.

== Competitions ==
Modern Jive competitions are typically judged based on the following criteria:

- Musicality
- Content and execution
- Style and technique
- Presentation

Depending on how the scoring is done, the judges may award marks for each of these, or may just give an overall mark or place, based on considering each of these factors.

=== UK competitions ===
As of 2015, Modern Jive Competitions in the United Kingdom include:

- UK Contemporary Blues & Smooth Dance Champs, Huddersfield (February)
- World Modern Jive Champs, Blackpool (March)
- English Modern Jive Champs Horsham (April)
- Ceroc Champs, London (May)
- Ceroc Northern Champs, Manchester (June)
- International Open Modern Jive Championships, Dorking (July)
- Ceroc Welsh Champs, Cardiff (September)
- European Blues Open Championships, (Ceroc Breeze) (October)
- Britroc, London (October)
- Ceroc Scotland Champs, Edinburgh (November)
- UK Modern Jive Champs, Whitby (November)
- Ceroc Midlands Champs, Stoke-on-Trent (November)

=== New Zealand competitions ===
As of 2019, Modern Jive Competitions in New Zealand include:

- Cerocmania Weekend, Auckland (March)
- Christchurch Modern Jive Champs, Christchurch (April)
- Waikato Ceroc Champs, Tamahere (May)
- Ceroc Coast to Coast Weekend, Tauranga (June)
- iDance Classic Champs, Wellington (June)
- Auckland Ceroc Champs, Auckland (September)
- iDance Simply Dance Weekend, Wellington (October)
- Ceroc Jurassic Jam, Auckland (October)
- Ceroc NZ National Champs, Auckland (November)

=== Australian competitions ===
As of 2019, Modern Jive Competitions in Australia include:

- SummerJive, Canberra (February)
- Victorian Modern Jive Championships, Melbourne (May)
- Australian Ceroc Dance Championships, Sydney (June)
- Gold Coast Champs, Gold Coast (July)
- IGNITE Queensland Modern Jive Championships, Gold Coast (August)
- DanceMAD, Melbourne (November)

=== Other competitions ===
Ceroc Pan Asia Dance Championships, various (October)

Some competition categories are more serious (Freestyle and Dance With A Stranger) while others are more about having fun (Battle of the Sexes, Steals).

== Versions (varieties) ==
=== Stylistic ===
- Slow Jive
- Double Jive (one leader with two followers)
- Rockabilly Jive

=== Local and historical ===
- France: Be-bop — also known as Le Bop, a precursor to Modern Jive
- UK: LeRoc, Ceroc
- Finland: Fusku
- Sweden: Bugg (this dance is known Scandinavia-wide), Double Bugg (варіант подвійного джайву)
- Norway: Vestlandsswing, Fastingswing and Folkeswing (the latter is a local name for the Bugg).

== See also ==
- List of basic dance topics
- List of dances
- Social dance
