= Double bugg =

Swedish dance

Double bugg (Swedish: Dubbelbugg) is a Swedish swing dance.

== Dance detail ==
Double bugg is more or less a competitive dance within the BRR dance family administered by the Swedish Dancesport Federation. The dance style has its background in another typical and invented Swedish dance style, namely Bugg. Bugg comes originally from Lindy Hop (Jitterbug).

Double bugg is danced by three persons, especially a man and two women. Variations occur however. Double bugg is mostly performed at dance competitions, but sometimes among social dancers. The dance arose during the 80s due to a lack of men wanting to dance. Then it was discovered that a man could dance the Swedish partner dance Bugg with two women concurrent. Suddenly a new dance style in Sweden was invented, double bugg.

Today double bugg is a small formation dance consisting of three people. The formation of different patterns and formations, for example lines, circles, triangles are apart from changing place between the dancers, one of several main features in double bugg. The essence of the dance is free and is taken from some other Swedish BRR dances: Bugg, Lindy Hop, Boogie Woogie and Rock and Roll (dance). Double bugg is mainly danced to modern pop or rock'n'roll music.
