= DanceSport South Africa =

- Sport: Dancesport
- Jurisdiction: South Africa
- Abbreviation: DanceSport SA
- Founded: 1994
- Affiliation: World DanceSport Federation
- Affiliation date: 2010
- Headquarters: Pretoria
- Location: 11 SH Mac, Stellenberg Road, Equestria, Pretoria, Gauteng, 0184
- President: Thabo Phiri
- Secretary: Sho Mshengu

Official website
- www.dancesportsa.co.za
- (South Africa)

DanceSport South Africa (DanceSport SA) (DSSA), formerly the Federation of Dance Sport South Africa (FEDANSA), is the governing body for dancesport and related dance styles in South Africa. It is a full member of the world governing body World DanceSport Federation (WDSF) and recognised by SASCOC. DanceSport SA is the sole custodian and controlling body of organised dancesport in South Africa.

DanceSport SA organises national competitions such as National Hip-Hop Championships and the National Achievers & Championships where provincial contestants compete for national honours.

The Federation of DanceSport South Africa (FEDANSA) was formed in 1994 after integration of former Black and White structures in South Africa. This was in response to political changes that were taking place in South Africa towards democracy. FEDANSA is the official controlling structure and sole custodian of DanceSport and related dance styles in South Africa, issuing Provincial and Protea colours in South Africa.

In 2014 a new logotype was introduced, with the new name. DanceSport South Africa is member of the South African Confederation of Sports and Olympic Committee (SASCOC), founding member of the South African DanceSport Federation (a Zone Six DanceSport Structure) and World DanceSport Federation (WDSF) which is the only International DanceSport Organisation recognized by International Olympic Committee (IOC), General Association of International Sports Federations (GAISF), International World Games Association (IWGA) and Association of the IOC Recognized Sports Federations (ARISF).

DanceSport South Africa's main members are provinces and Associate Members. Different commissions take care of interests’ groups and experts and facilitate access and growth of DanceSport. These are DanceSport Technical Commission, Disabled DanceSport Commission, School Sport Commission and Athletes' Commission.

Following IOC recognition, the World DanceSport Federation (WDSF) continues to work for the inclusion of DanceSport as a medal sport in the Olympic Games.

== See also ==
- Dancesport
- Sport in South Africa
