= WDSF World Formation Latin Championships =

Dance competition

The WDSF World Formation Latin Championship is the main annual formation International Latin dancesport championship worldwide.

== Summary of championships ==
Number	Year	City	Country	Date	Venue	No. of Teams	Winners
1	1998	Gothenburg	Sweden				
2	1999	Vilnius	Lithuania				(Lithuania) Žuvėdra
3	2000	Wels	Austria	25 November	Wels Bosh Halle		
4	2001	Bremerhaven	Germany	24 November	Bremerhaven Stadthalle		
5	2002	Vilnius	Lithuania	21 December	Vilnius Palace of Concerts and Sports		(Lithuania) Žuvėdra
6	2003	Essen	Germany	22 November			(Lithuania) Žuvėdra
7	2004	Minsk	Belarus	27 November			(Lithuania) Žuvėdra
8	2005	Munich	Germany	3 December			(Lithuania) Žuvėdra
9	2006	Bremen	Germany	2 December			
10	2007	Bremerhaven	Germany	1 December			
11	2008	Vienna Hausberge	Austria		Arena Nova	22	(Lithuania) Žuvėdra
12	2010	Moscow	Russia				(Russia) Vera Tyumen
13	2011	Vilnius	Lithuania		Siemens Arena		(Lithuania) Žuvėdra
14	2012	Bremen	Germany				(Germany) Grün-Gold-Club
15	2013	Bremen	Germany				(Germany) Grün-Gold-Club
16	2014	Bremen	Germany				(Germany) Grün-Gold-Club
17	2015	Vienna Hausberge	Austria	12 December		20	(Germany) Grün-Gold-Club
18	2016	Bremen	Germany	10 December		19	(Germany) Grün-Gold-Club
19	2017	Vienna	Austria	9 December		18	(Russia) DUET-A Perm
20	2018	Shenzhen	China	2 December		15	(Germany) Grün-Gold-Club
21	2019	Bremen	Germany	7 December		19	(Germany) Grün-Gold-Club
22	2021	Bremen	Germany	18 December		13	(Germany) Grün-Gold-Club
23	2022	Braunschweig	Germany	15 October			(Germany) Grün-Gold-Club
24	2023	Hong Kong	Hong Kong	18 December			(Germany) Grün-Gold-Club
25	2024	Schwechat (Vienna)	Austria	7 December		13	(Germany) Grün-Gold-Club
