= Miguel Angueira =

French dancer

Miguel Angueira was an acrobatic rock'n'roll dancer from France, multiple world champion. Together with his partner Natasha Quoy he has held number one place in the World Rock'n'Roll Confederation ranking list.

== Partners ==
- Dorothée Blanpain
- Clarisse Solbes
- Natasha Quoy
- Helen Trickleby

== Titles ==
- 1990 (Amateur) World Champion (together with Dorothée Blanpain)
- 1991 World Champion (together with Dorothée Blanpain)
- 1992 World Champion (together with Dorothée Blanpain)
- 2005 European Champion (together with Natasha Quoy)
- 2006 European Champion (together with Natasha Quoy)
- 2008 European Champion (together with Natasha Quoy)
- 2010 European Champion (together with Helen Trickleby)

== Videos ==
- World Championship 2006 Schaffhausen - Miguel Angueira& Natasha Quoy Acrobatic
- World Championship 2006 Schaffhausen - Miguel Angueira& Natasha Quoy Foot technique
- French National Championship 2006 - Miguel Angueira& Natasha Quoy Acrobatic
- World Masters Competition 2005 Winterthur - Miguel Angueira& Natasha Quoy Acrobatic
- Miguel Angueira and Dorothée Blanpain - early nineties Foot technique
- Miguel Angueira and Natasha in the French TV Show Incroyable Talent
