= Uganda DanceSport Federation =

DanceSport governing federation

- Abbreviation: UDSF
- Formation: 5 January 2018; 8 years ago
- Founder: Ssebuyungo Barnabas
- Founded at: Kampala, Uganda
- Type: Sports federation
- Purpose: Sport governance
- Headquarters: Namirembe, Balintuma Road, Kampala, Uganda
- Location: Kampala, Uganda
- Region served: National
- Secretary General: Ssebuyungo Barnabas
- President: Sanyu Sharifah
- Affiliations: National Council of Sports Uganda Olympic Committee
- Staff: 30
- Website: https://ugandadancesport.org/

The Uganda DanceSport Federation (UDSF) is the governing body of DanceSport disciplines in Uganda. The federation was founded in 2018 by Ssebuyungo Barnabas at Kampala Club....., getting its certificate from the National Council of sports in 2021.

Dancesport was introduced in Uganda after the formation of the UDSF.

UDSF is a member of the World DanceSport Federation (WDSF), the international governing body of DanceSport in the world.

In 2021, the Uganda DanceSport Federation embarked on creating awareness to make the sport known to the people.

In 2021, UDSF participated in their first World Breaking Championships which took place in Paris, France between 4 – 5 December at the Theatre du Chatelet.

In 2022, UDSF sent a team of participants in the Breaking Dancesport Championships in Seoul, Korea.

UDSF participated in the 2023 WDSF Africa Breaking Championship Olympics qualifiers which took place in Rabat, Morocco.

== UDSF Competitions ==
- Secondary schools regional competitions
- UDSF Breaking For Gold regional qualifiers
- WDSF Breaking For Gold world series
- UDSF Breaking For Gold nationals (WDSF Breaking championship)
- Pyel Myel
- Underground hip-hop cypher
- Kids cypher
- Battle Arena
- Popping for life
- WDSF Breaking for gold
- DanceSport capacity building camp
- Urban Afro Battles (go back to school)
- Breaking Girl Rain memorial event

== Executive Committee ==
No.	Name	Position
1.	Sanyu Sharifah	President
2.	Mwandha Anthony	Vice president sport
3.	Ssebuyungo Barnabas	General secretary
4.	Tinka Rita	Vice President Finance
5.	Amutuheire Innocent	Vice President Administration
6.	Kaddu Yusuf	Head Cultural Dancesport
7.	Masaba Rodgers	Head Latin & Ballroom
8.	Kavuma Gerald	Head Urban Dancesport

Membership at the federation is categorized into three (3) categories

== Cooperate Membership ==
Centenary Bank, Haris International, France in Uganda, Joint clinical research centre, Uganda Secondary Schools Sports Association, Alliance française Kampala, Cr Amanya Advocates & Solicitors.

== Special Interest Groups ==
Secoundary Schools, Persons with Disabilities.
