= LeRoc =

LeRoc is a form of Modern Jive, a dance style that evolved in the 1980s out of dances including Swing, Lindy Hop and Rock and Roll. The main innovation was to simplify the footwork, making LeRoc very adaptable to different types of music in a 4-beat, fast or slow.

According to the particular teacher, it may incorporate elements of other dance styles including Salsa and Tango.

Both LeRoc and, later, Ceroc evolved in London during the Jive revival in the early 1980s, with dancers often being members of both clubs. LeRoc dances at the Notre Dame Hall, off Leicester Square, and Ceroc dances at the Porchester Hall in Bayswater rarely conflicted so it was easy to attend both, and rivalry between the clubs spurred the development of new dance moves. The split had occurred when James Cronin decided to trademark the word "Ceroc", and run the Ceroc club as a franchised business. The members of the LeRoc club, led by Michel Ange Lau, decided not to run it for potential income, preferring to concentrate on perfecting the dance. This means that, today, many unrelated Modern Jive organisations are free to use "LeRoc" in their names as it remains a generic term.

"The LeRoc Modern Jive Federation" is a non-profit federation of independent dance teachers that was set up in 1991, but it is not mandatory to join. It offers advantages (such as membership of the United Kingdom Alliance of Professional Teachers of Dancing and Kindred Arts (UKA) to its members.

It is said that the dance style came from France, where Swing / Rock and Roll dancing had not been so suppressed by the onslaught of Disco. LeRoc was named by Michel Ange Lau to describe a "distinctive" style of rock dancing, or "this Rock", while Ceroc, which appears a closer translation from French, is actually derived from "C'est le roc".

Despite the reported French roots of LeRoc, there is currently very little Modern Jive danced in France.
