= Skating system =

The skating system is a method of compiling scores in ballroom dance competitions. It is used for the final placings of competitors and is based upon a method that prioritises 'majority' and 'overall performance' as given by judges scores to solve problems that arise in what can be a subjective determination of quality of art as sport. The original version of the majority principle was formulated by Arthur Dawson and was introduced by the British Official Board of Ballroom Dancing (now British Dance Council) in 1937. After some improvements in 1947 and 1948, the system was not changed again by the Official Board until 1956. It was first used during the Blackpool Dance Festival and has gradually been adopted in ballroom competition around the world as well as by other dance competitions, including the World Salsa Federation.

The skating system consists of 11 rules, 10 of which determine the scoring of the final round.

== Preliminary rounds (Rule 1) ==
The first rule is for preliminary rounds (semifinals, quarter-finals, etc.). It says that for each dance of the round the judges must mark the number of dance couples specified by the chairman of adjudicators whom they decide to advance to the next round. The score of a couple is the number of all "pass" marks over all judges and dances. The couples with the highest score advance to the next round. Usually the number of the couples to enter the next round is known in advance. However, in the cases of ties the chairman decides the number of dancers for the next round.

== Finals (Rules 2-11) ==
Rules 2-4 specify how the dancers receive marks in the final round. The marks from each judge for each dance are the places for the dancers, with the 1st place being the highest. No ties are allowed, i.e., if 6 couples are in the final, all places 1-6 must be assigned.

The remaining rules are for the calculation of the final placement of the couples. They involve a formal tie-breaking process. Rules 5-8 are for tallying the final places for each dance separately, rules 9-11 compile the final overall placement of couples in a dance category including tie-breaker situations.

== Advantage of the Skating System over Averaged Marks ==
While awarding a winner on the basis of the arithmetic mean of the ranking recommendations may make intuitive sense, it does not make sense for the fair placement of competitors. For example, Competitors A and B receive the following ratings:

Competitor	Ranking					Arithmetic Average
A	1	1	1	1	7	2.2
B	2	2	2	2	2	2

After considering the arithmetic mean, B would be placed first and A second. Firstly, this would not correspond to any of the wishes of the judges and, secondly, the fifth judge's score would be disproportionately high. While the winner via the Skating System may not be immediately obvious to the untrained-eye and requires a set of calculations, avoidance of the latter case of outliers in judging (and the ability to break ties) shows the systems strength.

== Methodology ==
There must be an odd number of judges for the majority system to work, with each judge only allowed to assign each place once - there can be no tied results reported back to the competition scrutineer by the judges on the floor. Particularly in DanceSport the judges rankings give subjective final placings for each Competitor in a final which are then compiled using the Skating System to determine the final combined majority view of the judges.

The places are awarded one after the other, starting with the first place. For this purpose, the placements are processed one after the other, also starting with the first place. Later in the procedure, the placing to be allocated and the examined placement do not have to match.

- Clear majority - If only one Competitor who has not yet been placed has an absolute majority for the placement examined, they win the place to be awarded. Then the next place is assigned by examining the next lower placement (higher place numbers).
- Several Compeitors with a Majority - If there are several not yet placed Competitors who have received a majority for the examined place, the winner is the Competitor who has received the greater number of placements for this place or better. If several of these Competitors have an equally strong majority, the place numbers that make up this majority are added up and the person with the lowest total receives the place to be allocated (since he then received more "better" places). If the total is also the same, the next lower ratings for this Competitor are added one after the other until the place is allocated or all ratings have been taken into account and two or more shared places are allocated. Then the next free place is allocated by examining the same ranking (or if there are two Competitors with the same majority, the inferior Competitor receives the next free place).
- No Competitor with a Majority - If none of the not yet placed Competitors achieved the majority for the examined placement, the place will be allocated by examining the next placement.

In the following examples a “competitor” is used neutrally. The competitor depends upon the type of tournament which could be a couple, a formation or a single person.

=== Results with a Clear Majority for Each Place ===
The final result is calculated from a tabulation of each judges ranking for each competitor. From this the number of times the Competitor has received any given ranking can be determined, and the final placing for each competitor derived.

The 'calculation' part of the table is only filled in as far as the placement requires (in order not to create unnecessary confusion), with the remaining fields commonly left blank or marked with a "-". Often the individual judges are also listed in the scores using a letter (here denoted by A to E).

For this example the following results (majorities are marked here and in the following examples by an asterisk):

Competitor	Ranking					Calculation			Result
Competitor	A	B	C	D	E	1	1-2	1-3	Result
11	1	1	2	1	2	3*	−	−	1
12	2	2	1	3	1	2	4*	−	2
13	3	3	3	2	3	0	1	5*	3

Competitor number 11 received first place from three judges. Since this corresponds to the majority with five judges, they receive first place (in the fields 1-2 ( 2 and better ) and 1-3 ( 3 and better ) a "-" is entered).

Competitor number 12 only has two first places. Since with two ones and two twos they get a total of four ratings 2 and better (entered in field 1-2 ), they have a majority for second place.

Competitor number 13 received no first-place rankings ("0" in the field "1"). There are not enough 2 and better places (here only one), but for third place, Competitor 13 has the majority and thus receives third place.

=== Multiple majorities ===
Competitor	Ranking					Calculation					Result
Competitor	A	B	C	D	E	1	1-2	1-3	1-4	1-5	Result
11	1	1	1	5	2	3*	−	−	−	−	1
12	2	3	3	1	1	2	3* (4)	−	−	−	2
13	3	2	2	2	5	0	3* (6)	−	−	−	3
14	4	4	5	3	3	0	0	2	4*	−	4
15	5	5	4	4	4	0	0	0	3*	−	5

The columns 1 to 1-5 are looked through: The first place is clear because only Competitor 11 has a majority: Competitor 11 has three first-places, while Competitor 12 only got two first-places. Competitor 11 is now fully placed and a "-" is entered for 1-2 to 1-5 .

Now the column 1-2 is considered: Competitor 12 has three rankings of 2 or better , just like Competitor 13 with three twos (second-places). This means that the two Competitor have an equal majority (if there are five judges, three are required for a majority). So the sum of the evaluations is considered, but only those that make up the majority. This is written in brackets after it. Second place goes to Competitor 12 (1 + 1 + 2 = 4), while Competitor 13 (2 + 2 + 2 = 6) receives third place. If no decision had yet been made with the total, the lower scores would also have to be taken into account for these two Competitor . (See another example below.)

Further in column 1-3 : Nothing is decided there, as none of the remaining Competitor received a majority for this.

The column 1-4 now brings the decision for the two remaining Competitors: Competitor 14 has a majority of four rankings for 4 or better , while Competitor 15 also received a majority. But these are only three rankings of 4 or better , so fourth place goes to Competitor 14 and fifth place to Competitor 15.

=== No majority ===
It can easily happen that no Competitor could win a majority. In this case the other places are also taken into account to determine a winner:

Competitor	Ranking					Calculation			Result
Competitor	A	B	C	D	E	1	1-2	1-3	Result
11	1	1	2	2	3	2	4*	−	2
12	2	2	1	1	2	2	5*	−	1
13	3	3	3	3	1	1	1	5*	3

The column 1 does not bring a majority to any Competitor, since Competitors 11 and 12 can only combine two ones and the fifth one went to Competitor 13. Therefore, the column 2 or better ( 1-2 ) must now be considered.

There you can see that Competitor 11 only got four ratings that were 2 or better . Competitor 12, on the other hand, only had ones and twos and was able to combine all five places better than 2 . Competitor 13 only has a rating of 2 or better with the one one and thus no majority. The first place therefore goes to the Competitor 12, the second place to the Competitor 11.

The third column ( 1-3 ) lets the only place still to be allocated go to Competitor 13.

=== Shared places and wins with 2nd place ===
Thanks to the majority system, it is possible for those who have only received second places to win: if there is no majority for first place, the next places must also be included in the scoring. If a Competitor got all (or many) twos (second-placings), they may have the greatest majority here:

Competitor	Ranking					Calculation				Result
Competitor	A	B	C	D	E	1	1-2	1-3	1-4	Result
11	1	1	3	3	4	2	2	4* (8)	5* (12)	2.5
12	2	2	2	2	2	0	5*	−	−	1
13	3	3	4	1	1	2	2	4* (8)	5* (12)	2.5
14	4	4	1	4	3	1	1	2	5*	4

First, the column of the first places should be considered again: Competitors 11 and 13 each received two ones, Competitor 14 a one. This means that no Competitor has a majority and the column 1-2 must be taken into account.

Since all two went to the Competitor with the starting number 12, nothing changes in this column for Competitors 11, 13 and 14. However, with his five twos, Competitor 12 won a majority and thus first place. Since there are no other Competitors with a majority here, we continue with the third column.

In the third column ( 1-3 ) Competitors 11 and 13 were able to achieve a majority. Competitor 14 does not have a majority with two scores for places 3 or better and is therefore automatically fourth. Since the total for Competitors 11 and 13 is also the same (1 + 1 + 3 + 3 = 8 and 3 + 3 + 1 + 1 = 8), the column 1-4 must also be used for these Competitors (as in the previous example for first place). But that doesn't make a decision either, since both Competitors each got a four: They both have five ratings 5 or better with a total of twelve. This means that this place is shared: The Competitors share second and third place and receive 2.5 points as the result. In this case however, the result may be determined by a final dance-off involving the tied Competitors only. With only two Competitors on the floor the judges will have longer to assess the performance of each and determine the final placing.

=== Common mistakes ===
In a previous example it was pointed out that only Competitors for whom a majority has been found have to be evaluated to the end. This example takes a closer look at this case.

Competitor	Ranking					Calculation					Result
Competitor	A	B	C	D	E	1	1-2	1-3	1-4	1-5	Result
11	1	1	1	2	5	3*	−	−	−	−	1
12	2	4	5	1	2	1	3* (5)	3* (5)	4*	−	2
13	5	2	2	5	1	1	3* (5)	3* (5)	3*	-	3
14	3	3	3	3	3	0	0	5*	−	−	4
15	4	5	4	4	4	0	0	0	4*	−	5

The first place is easy to determine, because only Competitor 11 could achieve a majority with three ones.

There are two Competitors for places 2 or better ( 1-2 ): Competitor 12 and Competitor 13. Since both the strength of the majority and the sum of the scores (1 + 2 + 2 = 5) is the same, the other ratings must also be considered. The third places are also included and it is determined that Competitor 14 has the majority there. Still, they don't get second place.

Namely, only Competitors 12 and 13 may continue to be considered. The rule requires that they (who have a majority in the 1-2 column) must first be rated at the end.

So looking at the 2 or better ratings did not bring any improvement - both Competitors have a majority of three ratings with a total of 5 (through the ones and twos, which already led to a draw).

But the 4 now brings the decision: Only Competitor 12 received a four, so in the column 1-4 for Competitor 12 it says that the majority is now made up of four ratings, while Competitor 13 continues only has three ratings of 4 or better . Second place goes to Competitor 12 (the only Competitor who still had a majority in the 2 or better ) and Competitor 13 gets third place. So that all belonged to the processing of the column 1-2 , only that the worse ratings had to be included.

Then it continues with the column 1-3: Competitor 14 clearly has the majority and - although he has received all three - only gets the next free, i.e. fourth place.

Competitor 15 will receive the last placement to be awarded: fifth place.

== See also ==
- Game theory
- Discrete mathematics
