= European Rock'n'Roll Association =

European Rock'n'Roll Association (ERRA) was an organization founded in 1974 by Italy, France, Germany and Switzerland. Later on Sweden, Austria, Denmark and the Netherlands joined and when Canada joined the organization was renamed the World Rock'n'Roll Association when and in 1984 it became the World Rock'n'Roll Confederation.

== See also ==
- World Rock'n'Roll Confederation
