= Rock and Roll (dance) =

Athletic partner dance

Acrobatic rock and roll
- Genre: Lindy hop
- Time signature: 4/4
- Year: 1955

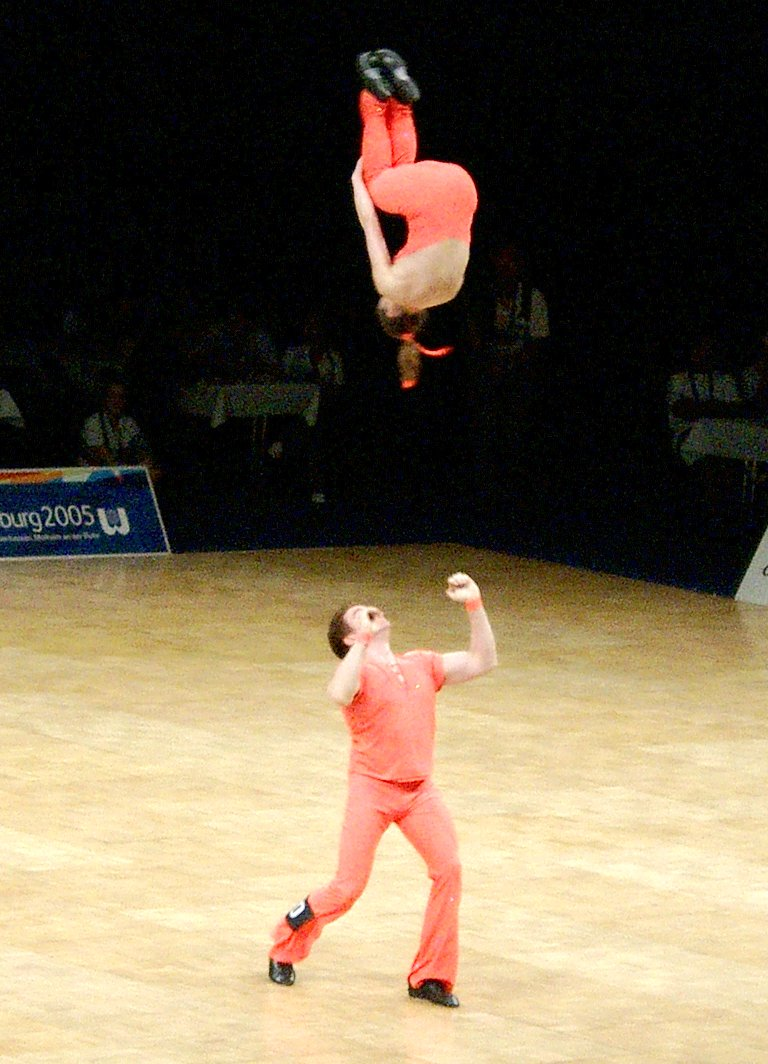
The double somersault, one of the most demanding acrobatic moves (Daniela Bechtold and Bernd Diel, World Games 2005 in Oberhausen, Germany)

Acrobatic rock and roll (spelled rock'n'roll by its organizing body, the World Rock'N'Roll Confederation) is a fast, athletic, physically demanding form of partner dance that originated from Lindy Hop but has evolved to a choreographed sport, often done in formal competition. It is danced by both couples (usually of mixed gender) and groups, either all-female or four to eight couples together.

== History ==
From swing dance, which had come into being around 1920, there emerged Lindy Hop, the first partner dance ever to feature acrobatic elements, which was later modified to suit faster music, spawning dance steps to accompany rock 'n' roll as that genre developed. Today's rock and roll dance has gone far beyond these origins, especially in its gymnastic moves.

== Technique and basics ==
The Rock and Roll form's specifics vary across the world, but its kick-step footwork style starts with the 6-basic step:

Leader starts with left foot kick ball change, kick step (left), kick step (right).

Follower starts with right foot kick ball change, kick step (right), kick step (left).

Another simple form of basic footwork uses a tap step:

Leader starts with their left foot and does a back step, then a tap step (left), tap step (right).

Follower starts with the right foot and does a back step, then a tap step (right), tap step (left).

The most obvious acrobatic feature of this dance sport are its kicks (into thin air) and its gymnastic elements like lifts, jumps, throws and flips. Today's rock and roll dance is focused on show and competition dance and, with the exception of its name, has nearly nothing in common with earlier dance steps done to rock music. It is danced in pairs or in formation and can even be danced with one male and two females simultaneously, a form called "triples".

Over the years rock and roll dancing has experienced several important changes: the former 6-basic step was converted into the modern tournament's 9-basic step with its typical kick ball change. Other characteristics are techniques such as the man's body wave movement, which he uses to fling his partner from a sitting position upwards, and the throwing basic movement, where she steps onto his hands and is catapulted upwards into breakneck jumps. Because of its demanding technique, high speed, and acrobatics, rock and roll is a straining high-performance dance and is most often performed by young dancers.

The name of the basic step comes from the number of separate actions. With the 6-basic one counts (1)step (2)step (3)kick (4)settle (5)kick (6)settle or (1)kick (2)settle (3)kick (4)settle (5)kick (6)settle, with the 9-basic it is (1)kick (2)ball (3)change (4)kick (5)settle (6)settle (7)kick (8)settle (9)settle. This means that a correct rock and roll kick will have the supporting foot settling on the floor a tiny moment before the kicking foot settles.

== Dance categories ==
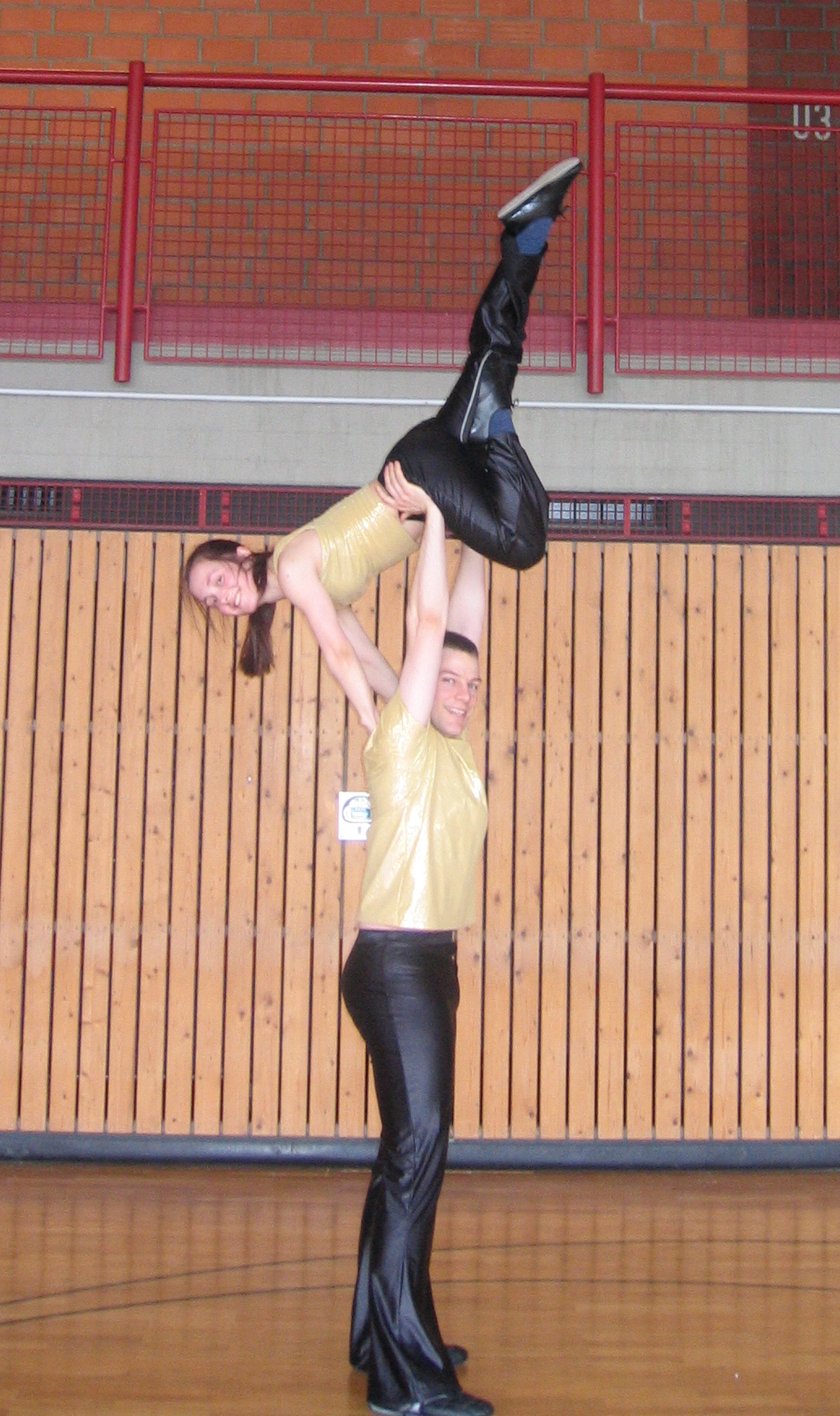
The "swan", a popular acrobatic move in the Junior class.

The World Rock'N'Roll Confederation (WRRC) recognizes the following dance categories for international competitions:

- Youth: No acrobatics allowed. Couples are 14 years old or younger.
- Juniors: A maximum of four acrobatic moves are allowed under the category's safety regulations. Couples are between 12 and 17 years of age.
- Main Class Contact Style: Two dances per couple and round. One is a dance program with no acrobatics allowed (footwork, or foot technique), the other an acrobatic program (acrobatic) requiring six acrobatic moves. The male may throw the female into the air, but no flips are allowed. Minimum age is 14 years.
- Main Class Free Style: Two dances, as in B-Class. Only difference to B-Class is that almost all acrobatics (e.g. lifts, jumps, throws and flips) are allowed. Minimum age is 15 years.

National associations usually have additional classes (e.g., a C class for beginning competitive dancers). However, all have the four classes listed above (though some rules may differ).

== Rhythm and music ==
Rock and roll dance works on the 4/4 measure, one basic step comprising six beats and therefore one and a half measures. Unlike much rock 'n' roll music, the dance puts stress on the first and third beats of each measure. Because of its non-off beat stressing and speed, the dance has now replaced traditional rock 'n' roll music with modern disco and pop music, played very fast, between 176 and 208 bpm.

== Clothes ==
Current advanced tournament rock and roll dancers wear neither petticoats nor jeans, as the dancers originally did, but rather multicoloured costumes made of elastic artificial fibre, made individually by special tailors. One reason is that their acrobatic maneuvers have grown more and more dangerous, requiring rugged apparel that still provides freedom of movement.

The shoes they wear are especially important, as their soles must both grip and slip properly. The most common footwear is light jazz shoes for the dance programs and, especially for women, usually aerobics sneakers for the acrobatic programs.

== Organization ==
The WRRC sets national and international rules and guidelines for tournaments and organizes the World Cups, European championships, and World Championships held every year for couples and bodies. All international competitors are ranked by points won during competitions. The International Olympic Committee has officially recognized the WRRC, which aims for acrobatic rock and roll to become an Olympic sport.

== Notable dancers ==
Notable dancers of this sport, among others, are Katerina Tikhonova, second daughter of the Russian president Vladimir Putin, and Miguel Angueira, a French world champion of this sport.

== See also ==
- World Rock'n'Roll Confederation
- International Dance Sport Federation
