= Ceroc =

International dance club

- Inventor: James Cronin
- Year: 1980

Ceroc is an international dance club and dance-style with more than 200 venues across the United Kingdom as well as national and regional competitions and weekend events throughout the year. It also has franchises in many other countries in Europe, Asia, and Australia and New Zealand.

The name Ceroc is said to derive from the French c'est le roc ('it is rock'), used to describe rock and roll dancing in France.

== History ==
James Cronin, the son of writer Vincent Cronin and grandson of Scottish author A. J. Cronin, founded Ceroc in London, England. In January 1980 he held the first Ceroc event in Porchester Hall in London. By 1982 Ceroc had a cabaret team, which performed routines in London nightclubs and other venues. Throughout the spring and summer of 1982 the Ceroc troupe worked with choreographer Michel Ange Lau, whose classes Cronin and Sylvia Coleman had attended in 1980 at the Centre Charles Peguy, a French youth centre in Leicester Square. The first video recording of a Ceroc event appears on the description for the 'Gold Bug' routine, performed at the 1982 Ceroc Ball, a charity event at the Hammersmith Palais.

In the late 1980s and early 1990s Cronin and Coleman established Ceroc Enterprises, registered "Ceroc" as a trademark, and started to sell Ceroc franchises around the country. In 1992 the Ceroc Teachers Association (CTA) was formed, with associated examinations: all Ceroc teachers had to pass the relevant CTA examinations before gaining licences to teach at Ceroc events. In 1994 Ceroc introduced taxi dancers to their venues – volunteers who are experienced dancers, designated to assist beginners.

In the early 2000s Cronin and Coleman sold Ceroc Enterprises to Mike Ellard. By 2004 Ceroc Enterprises were running more than 100 different venues and claimed attendance figures of 500,000. In 2006 Ceroc started expanding into the weekend event market. In October 2019 Ceroc Enterprises was sold to The Dance Holiday Company, owned by Robert Thompson, who then changed the name to Ceroc Enterprises. The sale was financed by a debenture over the assets of the company held by Ellard.

As of 2008 Ceroc Enterprises had franchises operating in Ireland, France, The Netherlands, Italy, Spain, the UAE, Canada, the United States and Hong Kong. As of September 2008 more than 30 Ceroc franchises operated in the UK, with 150 Ceroc venues there. Ceroc organisations trade in the US, Canada, Australia, New Zealand, Singapore, Hong Kong, South Africa and Dubai.

Apart from the franchises listed above, Ceroc organisations operate in Australia and New Zealand. Ceroc Enterprises is a separate company from Ceroc Australia and Ceroc and Modern Jive Dance Company (CMJ, also based in Australia). These Australian companies are not franchisees of Ceroc Enterprises. Similarly there is no legal connection between Ceroc Enterprises and Ceroc New Zealand. In November 2013 Ceroc Australia was sold by Mark Harding to Ceroc and Modern Jive Dance Company or CMJ to bring them both back under the same umbrella following their split in 1998.

== Modern jive ==
Outside the Ceroc franchise, the dance style modern jive is also taught and danced in many independent venues, where it is commonly called LeRoc. Originally the same dance style was taught in Ceroc venues and independents but they have diverged enormously over the last 20 years. However dancers who have learned at either Ceroc venues or independents can dance together in freestyle, since apart from stylistic differences it is fundamentally the same dance. Ceroc franchise venues often attract a younger demographic than independents, largely because of their branding and because they often recruit younger teachers.

In 1990 Robert Austin, an original Ceroc franchisee who had broken away from Ceroc to form LeJive, coined the term modern jive, a generic term for the dance form used by teachers and clubs not affiliated with Ceroc Enterprises. Ceroc does not now use the term modern jive and Ceroc's website states that it now teaches dance in general, not a specific dance form.

== Class format ==
Most Ceroc venues run regular weekly classes, usually on Monday to Thursdays. Ceroc class formats are different from other dance forms in that:

- Students are typically taught in rows from a stage rather than gathered around a teacher.
- Classes are typically larger, with often more than 100 people in some UK venues.
- Classes are highly structured: a precise routine is taught to the leads who then lead the others.
- Beginner moves are designed for people who have never danced before, making the dance easy to learn and highly achievable.
- Beginner routines are centrally controlled: each venue teaches the same beginner class on a given day.
- Partners are rotated frequently, allowing Ceroc to advertise classes as "no partner required". This helps in the learning process since when you attend a Ceroc lesson you will dance with experienced and beginners alike. Lessons are organised so that partners are rotated every few minutes or every couple of moves.
- A small number of volunteer experienced dancers (called taxi dancers or taxis) are often available specifically to dance with beginners.
- Dancers pay for the evening rather than per class.

=== UK format ===
In the UK the franchise nature of Ceroc enforces a degree of uniformity across all teachers and all venues. Ceroc classes typically follow the same format, and comprise:

- A Beginners lesson, involving a routine of three moves drawn from a restricted repertoire of 12 moves, and lasting approximately 45 minutes. The Beginners routine taught on any given day is the same across all teachers and all venues.
- A freestyle period of approximately 15 minutes, in which beginners are encouraged to practise what they have learned and experienced dancers are free to dance whatever they wish. No moves are barred during a freestyle period, except aerials, and moves are improvised on the spot to the music. Partner-swapping occurs whenever the music changes and does not require leaving the dance floor.
- An Intermediate lesson, involving a routine of three moves drawn from a much larger repertoire of Intermediate-level moves and lasting approximately 45 minutes. At least one of the Intermediate moves will be a Classic move intended for new Intermediate dancers. Many of the harder Intermediate moves are based around these Classic moves. There are 24 Classic moves. Individual teachers are less constrained as to the content of the intermediate-level lesson. Intermediate moves are more complex and may contain footwork.
- In many venues, depending on available space, a Beginners Practice Session takes place at the same time, where beginners may review the moves taught in the Beginners lesson with the help of the taxi dancers. Beginners may instead watch the Intermediate lesson, if they so choose. The usual recommendation is for Beginners to complete approximately six Beginners classes before attempting to move up to Intermediate level.
- A second freestyle period lasting for the rest of the evening, which is around an hour and a half to two hours.

The start time varies from venue to venue but is generally between 7pm and 8pm. Sunday classes often start earlier. Whatever the start time, the entire evening lasts three to four hours in most venues (with rare exceptions).

=== Australian format ===
A Beginner Progression class (also known variously as Bridging, Beginner Consolidation, Intromediate or Freestyle class ) taught at the same time as the Intermediate or Intermediate/Advanced class has also been introduced in Sydney, Brisbane, Melbourne, Perth, and Adelaide, involving a breakdown of technique and either a review of the preceding Beginner class (possibly with some extensions or variations to the moves from that class) or a new routine drawn from a mixture of intermediate and beginner level moves . This class is taught at the same time as the Intermediate class.

Individual teachers are less constrained as to the content of the Intermediate classes, however there is generally a stronger focus on technique (footwork, frame & connection, balance etc.), intermediate skills (dips & drops, leans, spinning etc.) and styling rather than just teaching moves.

A video clip of a Ceroc class filmed in Melbourne can be seen at Mind Body & Soul

Most Australian schools teach "Step" footwork. See Modern Jive#Step footwork vs Rock footwork

=== New Zealand format ===
In the NZ Ceroc classes typically follow the same format, and comprise:

- A Beginners lesson, involving a routine of four moves drawn from a restricted repertoire of 23 moves, and lasting approximately 45 minutes. The Beginners routine taught will differ each class and you may encounter a couple of the same moves learned before as they draw from a small pool of 23 moves.
- A freestyle period of approximately 15 minutes, in which beginners are encouraged to practise what they have learned and experienced dancers are free to dance whatever they wish. No moves are barred during a freestyle period and moves are improvised on the spot to the music. Partner-swapping is encouraged whenever the music changes and does not require leaving the dance floor.
- An Intermediate lesson, involving a routine of three moves drawn from a much larger repertoire of Intermediate-level moves and lasting approximately 45 minutes. At least one of the Intermediate moves will be a Classic move intended for new Intermediate dancers. Many of the harder Intermediate moves are based around these Classic Beginner moves. There are 23 Beginner moves. Individual teachers are less constrained as to the content of the intermediate-level lesson. Intermediate moves are more complex and may contain footwork.
- Very rarely in some venues, depending on available space and teachers, a Beginners+ Session takes place at the same time, where beginners may review the moves taught in the Beginners lesson with the help of experienced dancers/teachers in training. Beginners may instead watch the Intermediate lesson, if they so choose. The usual recommendation is for Beginners to complete approximately six Beginners classes before attempting to move up to Intermediate level.
- A second freestyle period lasting for the rest of the evening, which is around an hour and a half to two hours.

The start time varies from venue to venue but is generally between 7pm and 8pm. Whatever the start time, the entire evening lasts three to four hours in most venues (with rare exceptions). According to Ceroc Dance New Zealand, the beginner moves are:

- Back Pass
- Basket
- Break Through
- Catapult
- Ceroc New Yorker
- Ceroc Spin
- Check Step
- Fan
- Figure Of 8
- First Move
- Hatch Back
- Loop Through
- Man's Comb
- Manhattan
- Push Spin
- Return
- Shoulder Block
- Slidebreak
- Squeeze Box
- Step Across
- Travelling Return
- Wurlitzer
- Yoyo

== Events ==
=== Freestyles and tea dances ===
As well as regular class nights, most Ceroc franchises put on special events, termed Freestyles, on Fridays, Saturdays, and Sundays. Sunday freestyles are termed tea dances and are often held in the afternoon rather than evening. Some freestyle events begin with an icebreaker class, usually at an intermediate level as beginners are unlikely to attend freestyles.

A typical Saturday night freestyle begins at either 8 or 9pm and runs until between midnight and 2am. Freestyles are usually held at larger venues such as town halls, and often have two rooms: the Main Room, usually the largest room playing up tempo music between 100 and 150 BPM; and often a 'Blues Room' or 'Chillout' room, playing slower music between 80 and 110 BPM, allowing for slower dancing focusing more on connection, interpretation and musicality.

=== Workshops ===
Many Ceroc teachers also occasionally run daytime dance workshops at weekends, which in the UK are known as Cerocshops. A workshop lasts for four hours, and covers more moves than are covered in a single regular evening class. The standard Ceroc workshops are graded (Beginners 1, Beginners 2, Beginners Plus, Intermediate 1, Intermediate 2, and Intermediate Plus). Specialised workshops may also be available which cover more advanced techniques and styles such as Dips & Drops, Baby Aerials, Double Trouble (one lead, two follows), Switch it Up (swapping partners), Ceroc to Blues, Footwork, Frame, Spins & Turn technique, Musicality, Connection & Posture. The frequency and content of these workshops depends on the resident teacher or guest teachers who may teach various workshops over the course of a weekend often with a freestyle party in the evening such as Ceroc Aberdeen's Beach Ballroom Weekend or Ceroc Conexion's Extreme Mini Weekender.

=== Championships ===
Ceroc Enterprises holds an annual UK Ceroc dance championship. This is held in London (currently at the Watford Colosseum) at the beginning of May with a mix of freestyle dancing and competitions. Competitions range from beginner oriented categories, such as the Lucky Dip (a Jack and Jill competition) and Ceroc X, where competitors are restricted to a set list of eight basic moves, which they have to dance to different musical styles and are judged on performance and musicality.

In recent years, the Intermediate and Advanced Freestyle Categories have been merged into an All Stars category divided into three different age brackets. Above this there is still the Open category, and Top Cats, another Jack and Jill where individual competitors are judged rather than couples. Other categories include Aerials, Showcase, and Team Cabaret competitions.

There are other championships held on a regional or franchise basis, for example the Midlands, Ceroc Scotland and Welsh champs, and the Australasian.

Ceroc also hosts the European Neo-Blues Championships. This is held at the Breeze weekend venue at the Pontins at Brean Sands in October, and includes an invitational Masters Jack and Jill, Blues Open, Blues DWAS, and Showcase categories.

=== Weekend events ===
Ceroc hosts a number of Ceroc Escape dance weekend events throughout the year, attracting hundreds of dancers from around the UK and Europe. Most of these take place at the Pontins holiday resorts at Camber Sands, at Southport and in Somerset. Other more luxurious events are held at hotels, such as LUX and Swish. Freestyle dancing begins on the Friday night and carries on until the Monday morning. During the day a range of classes and workshops is available with teachers from around the country. Most events have a Saturday-night cabaret, featuring teachers, competition and showcase performances.

In 2005 Ceroc Enterprises completed the purchase of Rebel Roc, along with its annual dance weekend event at Pontins, Camber Sands. The first such event under the ownership of Ceroc Enterprises was Ceroc 'Storm' at Camber Sands in March 2006. Ceroc Enterprises has expanded its weekend offerings and took over weekend venues from JiveTime (Camber Sands) at the end of 2007 and Jive Addiction (Southport) in August 2008.
