= List of DanceSport dances =

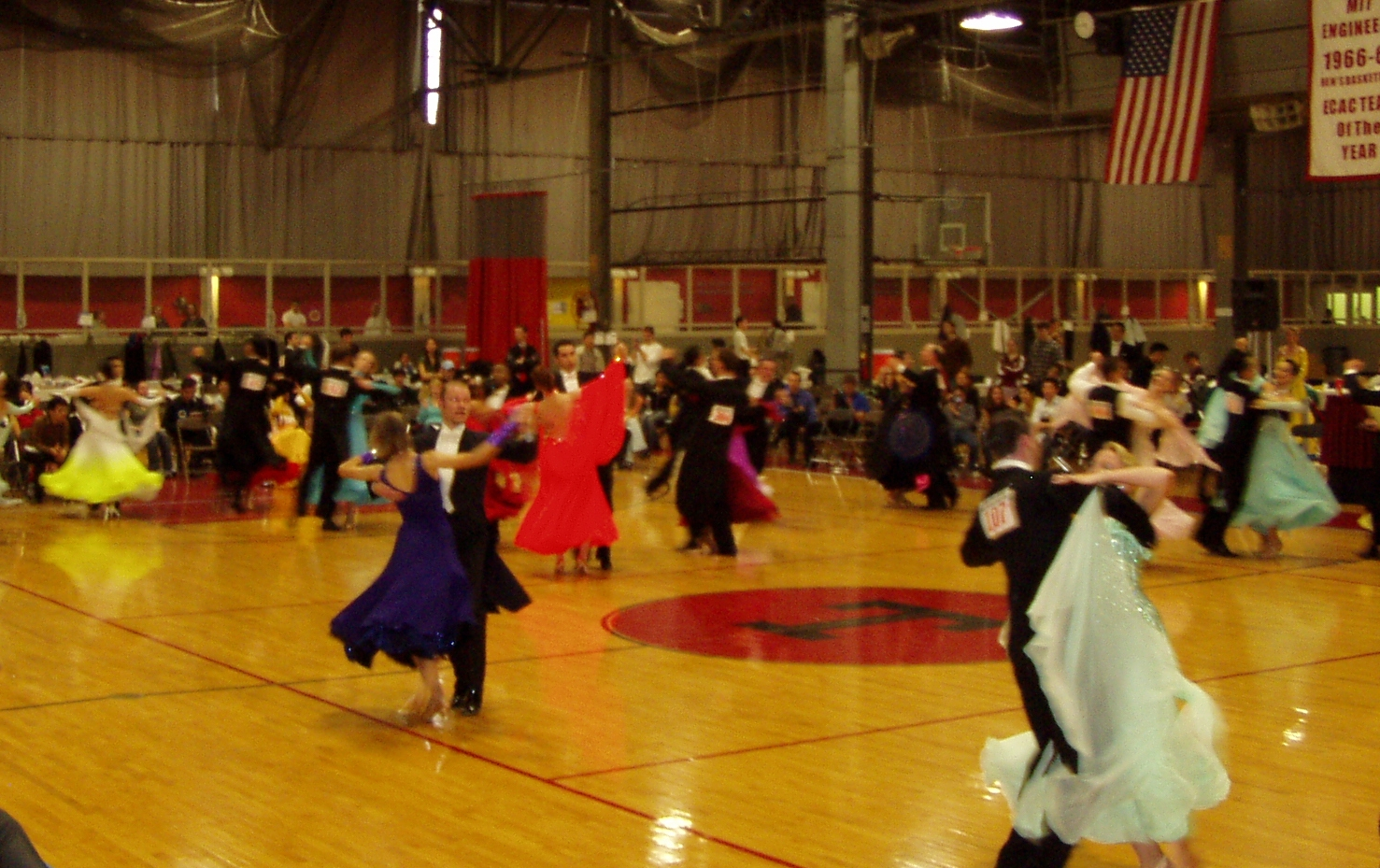
An amateur DanceSport competition at MIT.

The dances that make up the list of DanceSport dances are performed competitively at amateur and professional levels throughout the world. Ten international style ballroom dances—five Standard and five Latin—are defined by the World Dance Council (WDC), which has world-wide membership of all countries taking part in ballroom competitions.

The WDC incorporates various groupings and former titles, such as the World Dance and DanceSport Council (former title). The WDC is the governing body for international professional and amateur DanceSport. The World DanceSport Federation is, to some extent, a rival body which issues rules for amateur competitions. The list is supplemented by nine American style dances—four Smooth and five Rhythm—which are defined by United States dance organizations, such as USA Dance, (formerly USABDA, the United States Amateur Ballroom Dancers Association).

Besides determining which dances are performed, these organizations specify many other aspects of their competitions, for instance, the tempo of music allowed and the duration of each competition round.

There have been ongoing efforts to include DanceSport in the Olympic Games, with advocates highlighting its athletic and artistic qualities. While not yet an Olympic sport, DanceSport continues to gain recognition on international platforms.

== WDC International style dances ==
Within World Dance Council international competitions are two categories of dances, Ballroom (also called Standard or Modern) and Latin. In England (e.g. at the Blackpool Dance Festival), the categories are traditionally called Ballroom and Latin American dances respectively. In the Ballroom dances, men typically wear evening dress (coattails, waistcoats and white bow ties), while women wear gowns. Partners remain in closed position throughout the dance, and movements tend to be elegant and sweeping. The ballroom dances are progressive, moving anti-clockwise round the floor.

The Latin dances are more overtly sensual, with skimpy costumes for women and tight-fitting ones for men. More variation in movement is allowed than in the Standard dances. Close, semi-open and open figures are danced. Choreography is now extremely important. Hip action - Latin technique is required; and athletic and balletic maneuvers are incorporated which makes it into a DanceSport. Two Latin dances are progressive going counter clockwise (samba and paso doble), but there is no obligation to consistently move round the floor.

=== Ballroom ===
Name	WDSF tempo (MPM)	WDC tempo (MPM)	WDSF dancing time (seconds)	WDC dancing time (seconds)
Waltz	28–30	28	90–120	90–120
Tango	31–33	32	90–120	90–120
Viennese Waltz	58–60	60	90–120	75–90
Slow Foxtrot	28–30	28	90–120	90–120
Quickstep	50–52	50	90–120	90–120

=== Latin ===
Name	WDSF tempo (MPM)	WDC tempo (MPM)	WDSF dancing time (seconds)	WDC dancing time (seconds)
Cha-cha-cha	30–32	30	90–120	90–120
Samba	50–52	48	90–120	90–120
Rumba	25–27	24	90–120	90–120
Paso Doble	60–62	56	90–120	90–120
Jive	42–44	42	90–120	90–120

== American style ==
The Smooth and Rhythm categories of American style DanceSport roughly correspond to the Standard and Latin categories of International style. In Smooth, dancers wear costumes not greatly dissimilar to those worn by their counterparts in Standard---Standard dresses often have prominent floats embellishing the arms and fuller skirts which are typically absent in Smooth, due to the open movement and changing arm positions requiring less restriction on the body; however, the dances themselves are significantly different as a result of influence by dancers like Fred Astaire and Arthur Murray in the years following World War II. While elegance and flow remain the goal, as in International Standard, dancers do not remain in closed position exclusively, instead breaking away from each other periodically and experimenting with open footwork. The Rhythm dances were also influenced by American dancers of the post-World War II era, but the differences between it and International Latin are more subtle. Costumes are similar, and while step patterns are not identical, movements are as free and explicitly sensual as in Latin.

=== Smooth ===
Name	USABDA tempo (MPM)	USABDA dancing time (seconds)
Waltz	28–30	90–120
Tango	30–32	90–120
Foxtrot	30–32	90–120
Viennese Waltz	54	90

=== Rhythm ===
Name	USABDA tempo (MPM)	USABDA dancing time (seconds)
Cha-cha-cha	30	90–120
Rumba	32–36	90–120
East Coast Swing	34–36	90–120
Bolero	24–26	90–120
Mambo	47–51	90–120

== See also ==
- Soviet Ballroom dances
