= Žuvėdra =

Lithuanian dance sport club

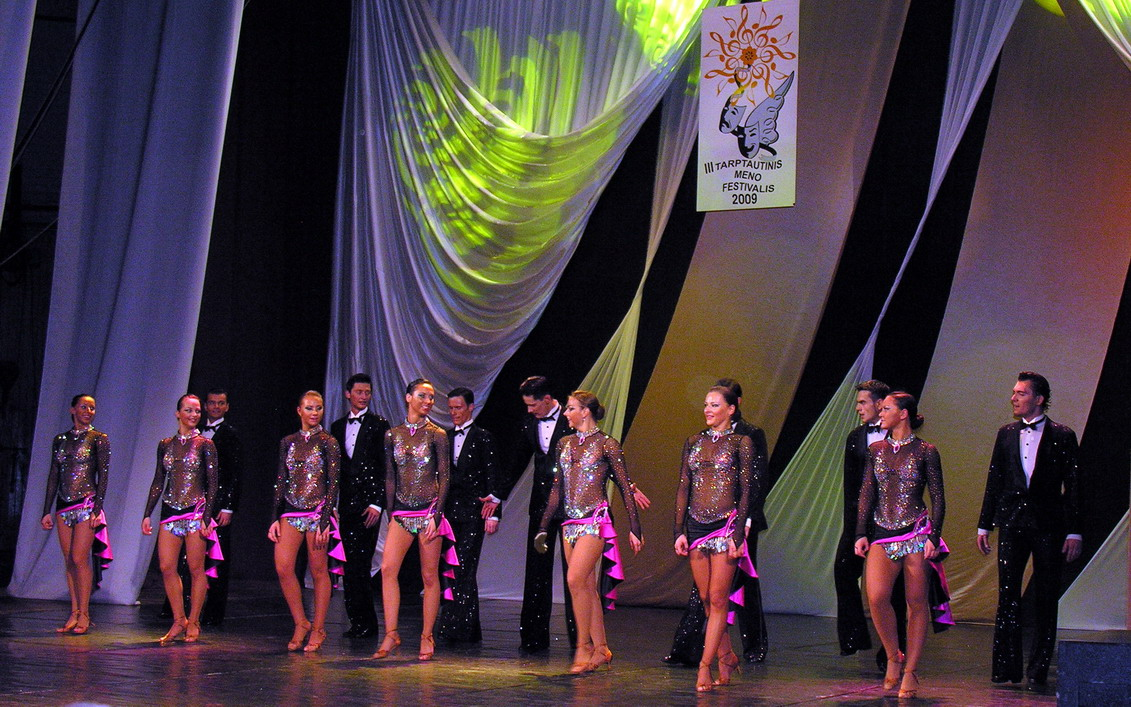
Žuvėdra performers in 2009

Klaipėda University DSC Žuvėdra (literally: tern) was a dancesport formation dance team since 1995 affiliated with Klaipėda University, Klaipėda, Lithuania. It is a 7-time world champion and 9-time European champion. It was founded in 1965 by ballroom dancers Ona Skaistutė Idzelevičienė. She and her husband Romaldas Idzelevičius (since 1971) were the primary coaches. The formation team operated until 2014, however the danceclub Žuvėdra still exists. and celebrated ints 60th anniversary in 2025.

== History ==
In 1965–71 it belonged to the Klaipėda Palace of Culture, in 1971–94 to the Palace of Culture of the Klaipėda Construction Trust, and since 1995 to Klaipėda University.

Since 1989, the team participated in World and European Championships. During 1995–2006, it was in the top 3 in European and World Latin Formation Championships, taking world first places in 2002–05. In 2006–13, the club formed the second team that participated in most important competitions. Besides competitions, the team performed at various events in many European countries. In total, the team performed 14 different compositions (music by composer Audrius Balsys since 1997, costumes by Aina Zinčiukaitė since 1999).

The team did not compete in the 2014 season as, after retirement of a cohort of experienced dancers in 2012–13, there were not enough replacements. In a press interview, the trainers blamed a higher education reform that made it more difficult for potential dancers to get admitted to Klaipėda University. Additionally, the team faced financial difficulties: it could not offer stipends to its dancers, only small discounts on tuition fees. Therefore, dancers had to balance studies, work, and practice.

== Championship results ==
Year	World Championship		European Championship	
Year	Location	Place	Location	Place
1989	Germany	7		
1991	Germany	5		
1992	Austria	4	Germany	4
1993	Norway	4	Germany	4
1994	Germany	3	Germany	5
1995	Germany	3	France	2nd place, silver medalist(s)
1996	Lithuania	2nd place, silver medalist(s)	Germany	2nd place, silver medalist(s)
1997	Germany	3	Poland	2nd place, silver medalist(s)
1998	Sweden	3	Hungary	3
1999	Lithuania	1st place, gold medalist(s)	Belarus	1st place, gold medalist(s)
2000	Austria	2nd place, silver medalist(s)	Czech	2nd place, silver medalist(s)
2001	Germany	2nd place, silver medalist(s)	Hungary	1st place, gold medalist(s)
2002	Lithuania	1st place, gold medalist(s)	Holland	2nd place, silver medalist(s)
2003	Germany	1st place, gold medalist(s)	Czech	1st place, gold medalist(s)
2004	Belarus	1st place, gold medalist(s)	Germany	1st place, gold medalist(s)
2005	Germany	1st place, gold medalist(s)	Germany	1st place, gold medalist(s)
2006	Germany	(silver) / 5	Lithuania	(gold) / 4
2007	Germany	3 / 6	Germany	2nd place, silver medalist(s)
2008	Austria	(gold) / 6	Germany	2nd place, silver medalist(s)
2009	Germany	(silver) / 5	Lithuania	1st place, gold medalist(s)
2010	Russia	(silver) / 5	Germany	(silver) / 5
2011	Lithuania	(gold) / 5	Russia	(silver) / 6
2012	Germany	(silver) / 6	Austria	(gold) / 7
2013	Germany	4	Lithuania	(gold) / 7
Note: from 2006, Žuvėdra had a second team competing. Its results are shown after the "/" symbol.

== Notable persons ==
- Ona Skaistutė Idzelevičienė and Romaldas Idzelevičius, leaders
- Aina Zinčiukaitė, dancer and coach; clothing designer for Žuvėdra (1998–2006)
- Jūra Laivytė-Kvasienė, dancer and coach
- Kestutis Bernatavičius, Lithuanian politician, Žuvėdra dancer (1992–1995)

== See also ==
- International DanceSport Federation
