= Blackpool Dance Festival =

Annual ballroom dance competition in England

- Dates: Annually, last week of May
- Locations: Winter Gardens, Blackpool, England
- Years active: 1920–present
- Founders: Harry Wood, Nelson Sharples
- Website: www.blackpooldancefestival.com

The 8-day Blackpool Dance Festival is the world's first and most famous annual ballroom dance competition of international significance, held in the Empress Ballroom at the Winter Gardens, Blackpool, England, since 1920. It is also the largest ballroom competition: in 2013, 2953 couples from 60 countries took part in the festival.

As of the early 21st century the festival is held in May. It covers ballroom and Latin American dancing, American smooth and incorporates the British Open Championships in categories of adult amateur and professional couples and formation teams. In 2005, two new categories were introduced: the British Rising Star Amateur Ballroom and Latin Competitions. Two invitation events, the Professional Team Match and the Exhibition Competition, create much interest.

The Junior Dance Festival, Blackpool Sequence Dance Festival which incorporates the British Sequence Championships, and British National Dance Festival are also held annually in Blackpool.

The annual World Professional Dancesport Championship is often held in Blackpool (five times between 1989 and 2012), but is not connected with the Dance Festival.

The world's largest amateurs' dance festival is the annual Euro dance festival in Rust, Germany, where shows of professional dancers are combined with workshops for a wide range of dancers from beginners to professionals.

In recent years, the festival has embraced modern technology, offering live-streaming and online access for global audiences who are unable to attend in person. This has expanded its reach and allowed fans worldwide to witness the artistry of competitive dance.

== Cultural references ==
It was depicted in the 1996 award-winning Japanese film, Shall We ダンス?, directed by Masayuki Suo and again, in the 2004 U.S. remake Shall We Dance?. Mai, played by Tamiyo Kusakari in the original film, and Paulina, played by Jennifer Lopez in the 2004 film, competed in the Dance Championship when, together with their partners; both suffered a fall during the semi-finals, causing them to be disqualified.
