= Formation dance =

Type of dance

Formation dance is a style of ballroom dancing. It is pattern or shadow team dancing by couples in a formation team. The choreography may be based on a particular dance or a medley of dances. Formation dancing may be done for exhibition or for competition between teams. There is also a type of formation in Bhangra.

== International style ballroom: dance sport ==
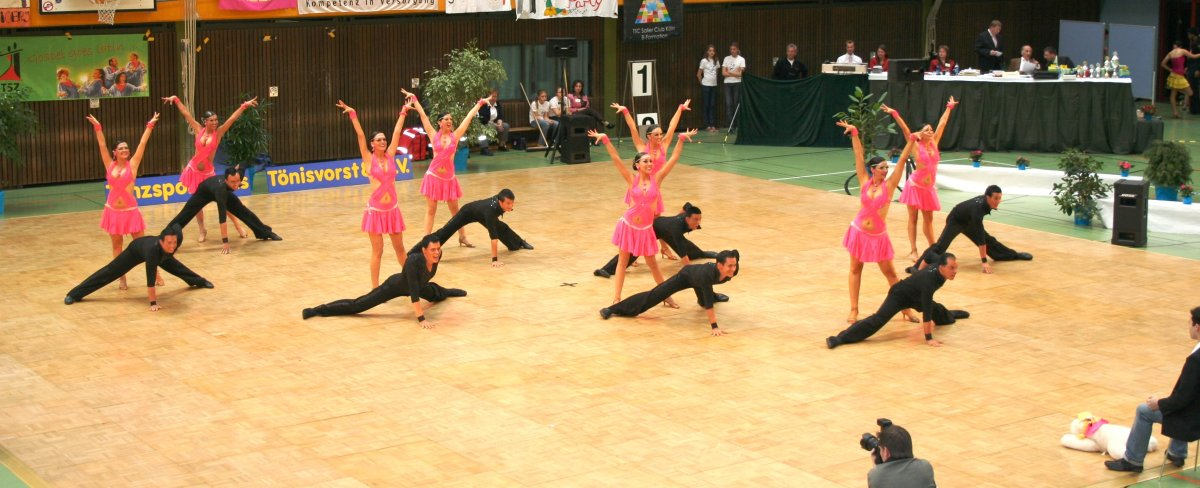
Latin Formation Team TSC Blau-Silber Aachen

=== History ===
Formation dancing originated in 1932 in London's Astoria Ballroom. It was Olive Ripman who introduced it under the name "pattern dancing". Soon it became a competitive dance form.

Formation team contests began in the 1930s in England, and spread to many other countries. International matches have taken place. Formation dances were an important part of the BBC TV program Come Dancing when Frank and Peggy Spencer's formation teams competed against Constance Millington's team. The peak of popularity was in the 1960s, and is now growing from strength to strength with formation teams from all over the world competing against each other.

=== Choreography ===
The choreography of a formation team includes both choreography of a dancesport routine of an individual couple and the overall pattern of movements of the couples on the floor. All couples are expected to follow the beat of the music and movements should be executed simultaneously. Teams are marked on their synchronicity

Latin Dancesport formation is a medley of dances that include the 5 International Latin dances: Cha Cha, Rumba, Jive, Paso Doble and Samba.

Standard or Ballroom formation is a medley of the 5 international ballroom dances Waltz, Quickstep, Tango, Viennese Waltz and Foxtrot.

The routines generally feature at least some free-form choreography in the walk on and walk off, which may include movements from jazz dance, ballet, or any other type of dance. This is clearly marked by a gong. A complete routine usually lasts a total of 6 minutes.

Formation routines allow dancers to show off their own technique in addition to their ability to move as a team. Unlike individual competitions tricks such as "round abouts", "chain reactions" form a large section of the choreography.

Shapes (also known as patterns or images) that are an accepted part of choreography are diamonds, squares, diagonals, circles and lines. The routine is judged by the distribution of competitors across the floor, how "readable" the patterns are and the transitions between these patterns.

Specialist formation choreographers include Ona Skaistutė Idzelevičienė, Roberto Albanese, Horst Beer, and Rachael Holland.

=== Competitions ===
The international governing body is the International DanceSport Federation (IDSF) (which has Olympic recognition). Competing teams must be a member of one of its member organisations such as the English amateur dancesport association ltd (EADA)

The following is a summary of the IDSF rules for European and World Formation competitions.

- Each member country may send 2 formation teams to compete in each of the 2 international styles (Latin and Standard).
- These are selected by national competitions, such as the British National Championships at the Blackpool Dance Festival.
- International competitions have a minimum of 4 countries
- The usual sporting anti-doping rules apply.
- All competitors must be amateurs.
- Each team must contain between 6 and 8 couples.
- In the standard section Men's dress must be black or midnight blue.
- In Latin men may wear coloured shirts but all men must dress the same.
- In standard formation, solo work is restricted to 8 bars. This does not apply in Latin where solo work usually plays a part.
- Lifts are not allowed in the main "judged" part of the routine, but are usually allowed in the walk on and walk off, which is clearly marked by a gong.
- A routine is a maximum of 6 minutes long including entry to and from the floor (a walk on and walk off). Only 4 1/2 minutes of this is judged so a gong is used to clearly signify which sections are to be judged.
- Competing teams are judged by those experienced in formation.

In early rounds, judges mark if they believe teams should go through to the next round. In final rounds teams are ranked and the skating system applies.

Other competitions of note are the Blackpool Dance Festival and the Donaupokal Invitational Competition Vienna. Germany is notable in having several leagues of formation teams, and holds several competitions each year.

=== Formation teams, 2013 ===
This is a list of Adult Formation Teams competing in 2013 in the IDSF World Ranking Competition. There were 22 Latin Teams and 18 Standard teams that compete annually in the World Cup

| Country | Latin Formation Team | Standard Formation Team |
|---|---|---|
| Austria | HSV Zwölfaxing, TSC Schwarz Gold | |
| Belarus | DC Mara, Minsk | Univers Formation-team, Minsk |
| Bulgaria | Ogosta Dance | |
| Czech Republic | TK 1976 Most, TKG Hlinsko | TK TŠ Starlet Brno, TK Chvaletice |
| England | Fiver Latin Team Preston XS Latin (TDE Manchester) | |
| Germany | Grün-Gold-Club Bremen, FG TSZ Aachen/TD TSC Düsseldorf Rot-Weiß | TC Ludwigsburg, Braunschweiger TSC |
| Hungary | Gála TE, Botafogo Dance Ensemble | Szilver TSE, Ködmön TSE |
| Lithuania | Klaipėda University DSC "Žuvėdra" (A and B) | |
| Mongolia | "Star" formation Mongolia, Moon dance formation Mongolia | Ulaan Sarnai Mongolia, Khatantuul Mongolia |
| Moldova | Codreanca | |
| Netherlands | Double-V (A and B), Dance Explosion | Step in Time, Dance Impression, Old-Forest |
| Poland | KS Kamion Dance Warsaw, Dance Formation A-z Przemysl, Dance Formation SPIN Wodzislaw Slaski, Dance Formation Takt-Chelm, LA CMG Radom | LOTOS-Jantar, Kadry |
| Romania | Floris Dance Team | Floris Dance Team |
| Russia | Vera Tjumen, DSC Tsveta Radugi | Impulse |
| Serbia | Vracar Formation Team | |
| Slovakia | | KTS Interklub Madit, TC Košice |
| Wales | Ystrad Fawr Latin Team | |

=== Results ===
Below are the Winners of IDSF World Championships

| Year | Venue | Standard Result | Venue | Latin Result |
|---|---|---|---|---|
| 1995 | Stuttgart, Germany | 1. TC Ludwigsburg, Germany | Berlin | TSG Bremerhaven, Germany |
| 1996 | Berlin, Germany | 1. TC Ludwigsburg, Germany | Vilnius | TSC Schwarz-Gelb Aachen, Germany |
| 1997 | Kishinev, Moldova | DSC Kodryanka Kishinev, Moldova | Munich | TSC Schwarz-Gelb Aachen, Germany |
| 1998 | Berlin, Germany | Allround Berlin, Germany | Gothenburg | TSC Schwarz-Gelb Aachen, Germany |
| 1999 | Elbląg, Poland | Jantar Elblag Jantar Elblag Poland | Vilnius | Žuvėdra Klaipėda University, Lithuania |
| 2000 | Braunschweig, Germany | Braunschweiger TSC, Germany | Wels (Stadt) | TSG Bremerhaven, Germany |
| 2001 | Berlin, Germany | DSC Kodryanka Kishinev, Moldova | Bremerhaven | TSG Bremerhaven, Germany |
| 2002 | Kishinev, Moldova | DSC Kodryanka Kishinev, Moldova | Vilnius | Žuvėdra Klaipėda University, Lithuania |
| 2003 | Stuttgart | DSC Kodryanka Kishinev, Moldova | Essen | Žuvėdra Klaipėda University, Lithuania |
| 2004 | Braunschweig, Germany | Braunschweiger TSC, Germany | Minsk | Žuvėdra Klaipėda University, Lithuania |
| 2005 | Elblag, Poland | Braunschweiger TSC, Germany | Munich | Žuvėdra Klaipėda University, Lithuania |
| 2006 | Moscow, Russia | Vera Tyumen, Russia | Bremen | Grün-Gold-Club Bremen Germany |
| 2007 | Stuttgart, Germany | 1. TC Ludwigsburg, Germany | Bremerhaven | Grün-Gold-Club Bremen, Germany |
| 2008 | Kishinev, Moldova | DSC Kodryanka Kishinev, Moldova | Wiener Neustadt, Austria | Žuvėdra Klaipėda University, Lithuania |
| 2009 | Ludwigsburg Germany | 1. TC Ludwigsburg, Germany | Bremen, Germany | Grün-Gold-Club Bremen, Germany |
| 2010 | Elblag, Poland | FS LOTUS Jantar Elblag, Poland | Moscow, Russia | Vera Tyumen, Russia |
| 2011 | Braunschweig, Germany | Braunschweiger TSC, Germany | Vilnius, Lithuania | Žuvėdra Klaipėda University, Lithuania |
| 2012 | Ludwigsburg, Germany | Braunschweiger TSC, Germany | Bremen, Germany | Grün-Gold-Club Bremen, Germany |
| 2013 | Tyumen, Russia | Vera Tyumen, Russia | Bremen, Germany | Grün-Gold-Club Bremen, Germany |
| 2014 | Braunschweig, Germany | Braunschweiger TSC, Germany | Bremen, Germany | Grün-Gold-Club Bremen, Germany |
| 2015 | Ludwigsburg, Germany | 1. TC Ludwigsburg, Germany | Wiener Neustadt, Austria | Grün-Gold-Club Bremen, Germany |
| 2016 | Pécs, Hungary | Vera Tyumen, Russia | Bremen, Germany | Grün-Gold-Club Bremen, Germany |
| 2017 | Braunschweig, Germany | Vera Tyumen, Russia | Vienna Austria | DUET Perm, Russia |

== See also ==
- List of DanceSport dances
- Swedish Dancesport Federation
- WDSF World Formation Latin Championships
