= Jive (dance) =

Dance style

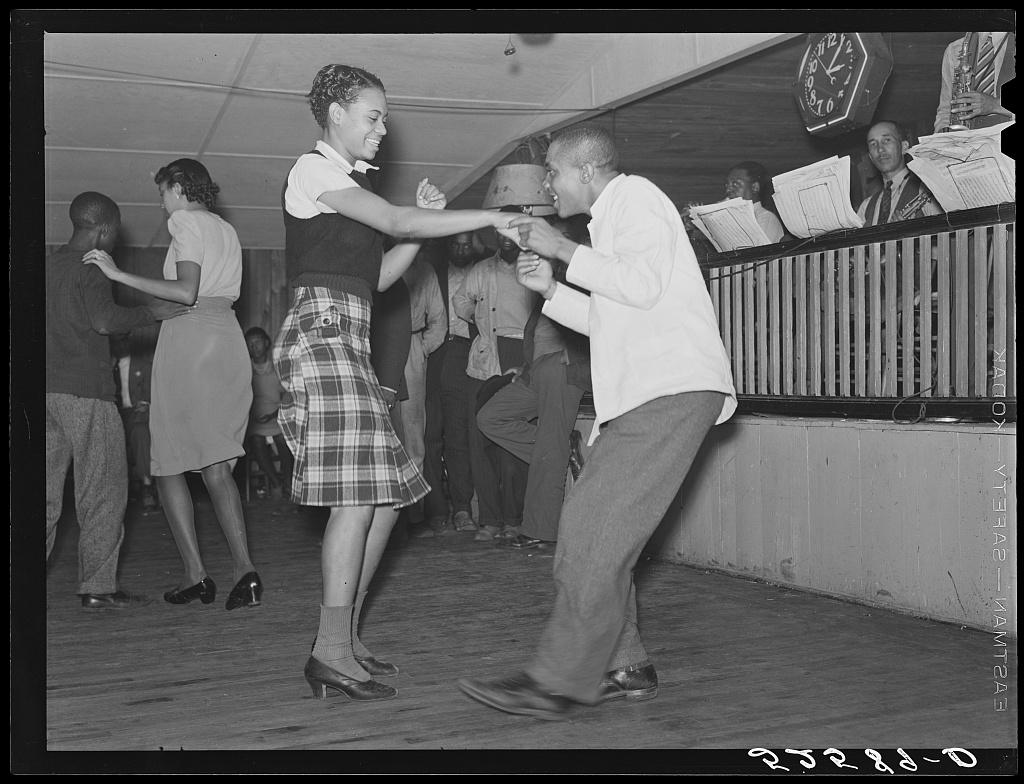
JiggerJivin' and funkin' in a juke joint in Memphis, Tennessee

The jive is a dance style that originated in the United States from African Americans in the early 1930s. The name of the dance comes from the name of a form of African-American vernacular slang, popularized in the 1930s by the publication of a dictionary by Cab Calloway, the famous jazz bandleader and singer. In competition ballroom dancing, the jive is often (mistakenly) grouped with the Latin-inspired ballroom dances, though its roots are based more on swing dancing than Latin dancing.

== History ==
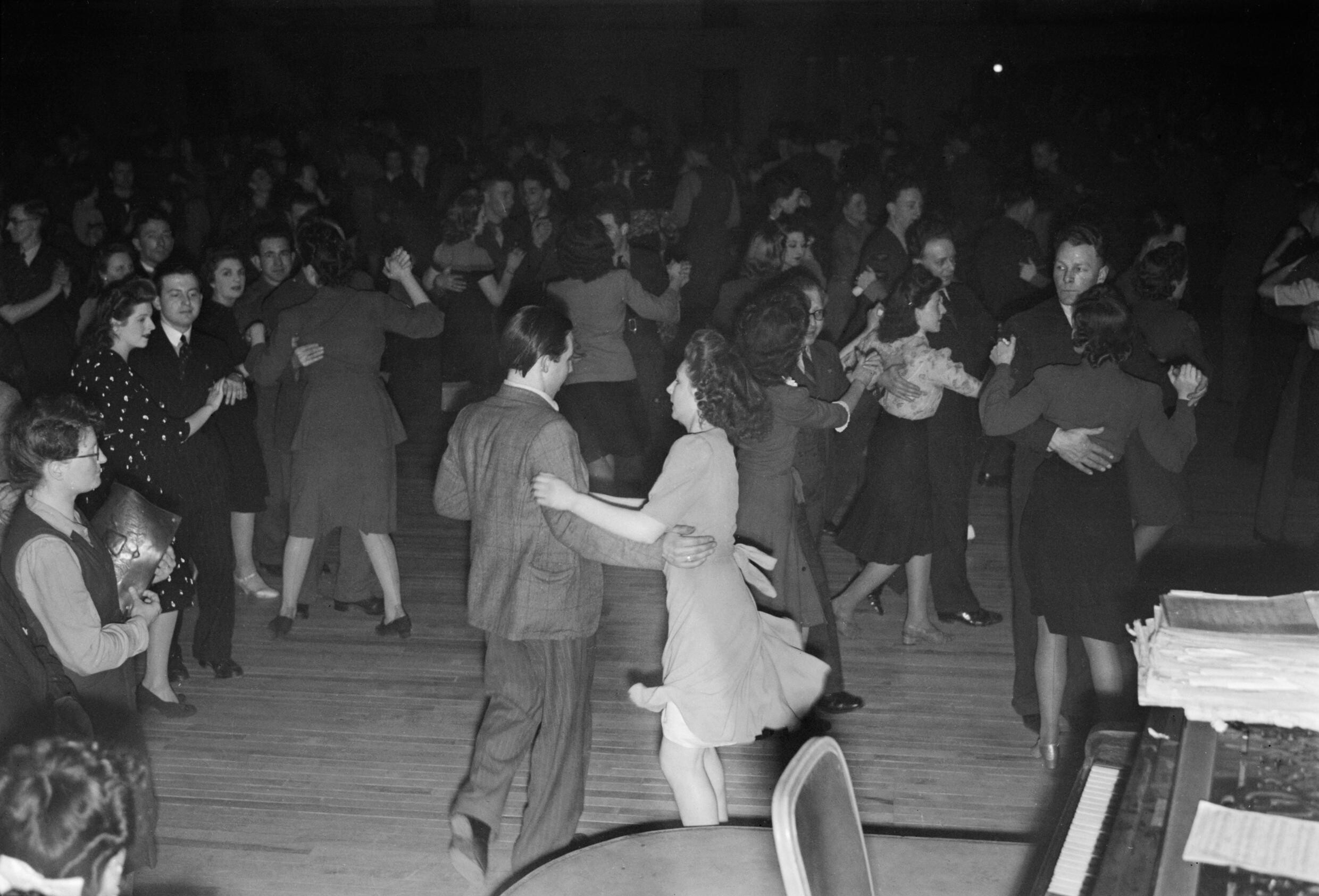
Jiving in a British dance hall, 1945

To the players of swing music in the 1930s and 1940s, jive was an expression denoting glib or foolish talk.

American soldiers brought lindy hop and jitterbug to Europe around 1940, where this dance swiftly found a following among the young. In the United States, "swing" became the most common word for the dance, and the term "jive" was adopted in the UK. Variations in technique led to styles such as boogie-woogie and swing boogie, with "jive" gradually emerging as the term in the UK.

== See also ==
- Modern Jive
- Bugg
- Fusku
