= Bugg =

Swedish partner dance

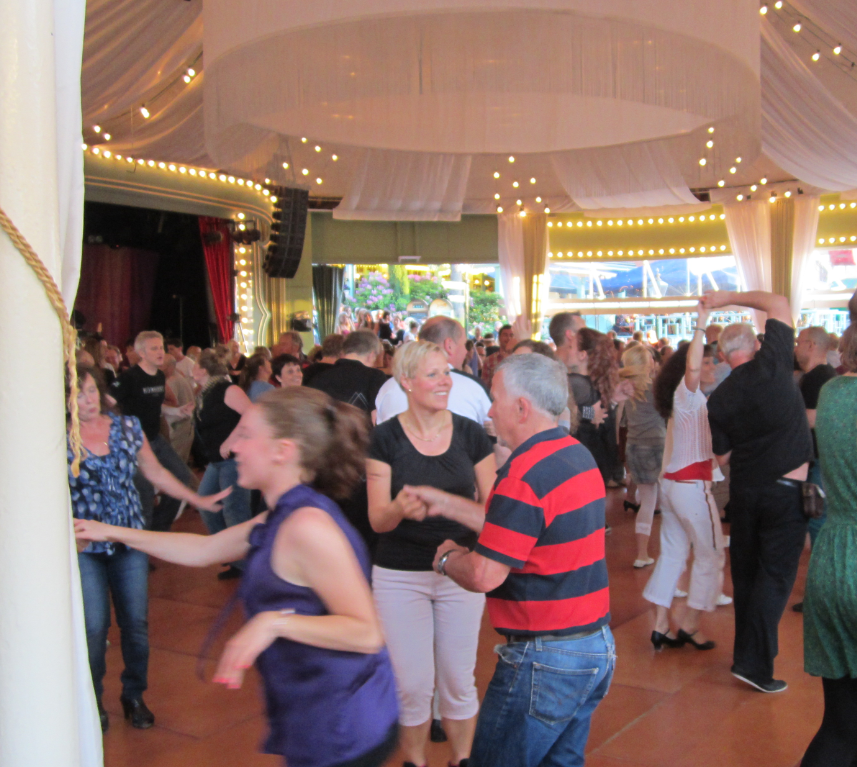
Couples dancing Swedish bugg

Bugg is a common dance style in Sweden and is very popular on the dance floors when dansbands play. Bugg is a dance in 4/4 time and performed at different paces (120–180 beats per minute). Bugg is a partner dance and follows certain basic rules, but is essentially improvised, with one partner following the other's lead. Acrobatic moves are not allowed on national or international dance competitions. Swedish bugg belongs to the swing dance family and closely resembles modern jive.

Bugg is both a very popular social dance as well as a competitive dance in Sweden. It also has the most competitors and practitioners within the Swedish Dancesport Federation.

A variant called double bugg is performed by one leader and two followers.

== Short history ==
Bugg is a Swedish phenomenon whose popularity gradually expanded in the wider Nordic region. The Swedish dancer Nils-Håkan Carlzon has been listed as a pioneer of the dance, developing its movements during his time at the Nerikes Dance Institute.

The dance has been described as a variant of the early Lindy Hop (jitterbug), swing, and also rock 'n' roll, which came to Sweden in the mid-1940s. In films from a famous dance place called Nalen in Stockholm, one can see the Swedish style of Lindy Hop. This style has various dialects and variants, but .

When bugg dance competitions began in Sweden during the mid-1970s, there was only one class for all participants: "freestyle". This was split in 1983 into two different styles, "social bugg" and freestyle. The following year, the styles were reorganized into freestyle and "rock".

Later on, these two styles more or less merged into a single style, which is what is generally seen today. Variants are found throughout the country, but the basics are more or less the same. All versions lack acrobatic elements. Today, bugg is one of the most popular social dances in Swedish dance clubs.

== See also ==
- List of dance style categories
- List of dances
- Competitive dance
