= Boogie-woogie (dance) =

Form of swing dance

Steps defined as boogie woogie dance

Boogie-woogie dance is a European variation of swing dance often done competitively that developed in the 1940s. Although its name derives from the boogie-woogie genre of music, it is most often danced to rock music. The form is cited in Madonna's hit single "Music".

== Description ==
Boogie-woogie in competition is a led, partnered dance, not choreographed. It falls under the umbrella of swing dance, but is distinct from Lindy Hop. It follows a six-beat dance pattern, usually cued as "step-step, triple step, triple step", each word taking one beat but the second syllable of "triple" delayed to match the music's syncopation.

In some parts of Europe, boogie-woogie is mostly done as a social dance, while, in others, it is mostly a competition form. The competitions are regulated by the World Rock'n'Roll Confederation. The competition forms of boogie woogie consist of main and junior classes.
