= World DanceSport Federation =

International sport governing body

- Formation: 12 May 1957; 69 years ago
- Type: International sport federation
- Headquarters: Maison du Sport International, Lausanne, Switzerland
- Members: 97 national member bodies (October 2023)
- President: Shawn Tay
- Website: www.worlddancesport.org
- Formerly called: International DanceSport Federation (1990); International Council of Amateur Dancers (1957)

The World DanceSport Federation (WDSF), formerly the International DanceSport Federation (IDSF), is the international governing body of dancesport and Para dancesport, as recognised by the International Olympic Committee (IOC) and the International Paralympic Committee (IPC).

Founded in 1957 as the International Council of Amateur Dancers (ICAD), it took the name IDSF in 1990. In 2011, it was renamed to WDSF to emphasise the global character of the organization.

== Presidents ==
Name	Country	Presidency
Otto Teipel	Germany	12 May 1957 – 13 May 1962
Heinrich Bronner	Germany	13 May 1962 – 23 June 1963
Rolf Finke	Germany	23 June 1963 – 27 June 1965
Detlef Hegemann	Germany	27 June 1965 - 6 November 1997 elected honorary life president in 1998
Peter Pover	US	6 November 1997 – 14 June 1998
Rudolf Baumann	Switzerland	14 June 1998 – 11 June 2006 retired as honorary life president
Carlos Freitag	Spain	11 June 2006 – 23 January 2016
Lukas Hinder	Switzerland	23 January 2016 - 17 November 2018
Shawn Tay	Singapore	17 November 2018 – present

== History ==
- 1909 First unofficial ballroom championships in Paris
- 1957 ICAD founded in Wiesbaden on 12 May 1957
- 1960 First television broadcast of Dancesport
- 1990 Name changed to IDSF
- 1992 Becomes a member of the General Association of International Sports Federations (GAISF)
- 1995 World Rock & Roll Confederation (WRRC) joins IDSF as an associate member
- 1997 Recognised by the IOC
- 2001 Subscribes to World Anti-Doping Code
- 2004 International Dance Organisation (IDO) joins IDSF as an associate member
- 2007 Presentation of the VISION 2012 project to the IDSF General Meeting
- 2008 IDSF and the International Paralympic Committee "enter into a collaboration agreement to promote Wheelchair DanceSport jointly"
- 2008 United Country and Western Dance Council (UCWDC) joins IDSF as an associate member
- 2008 IDSF General Meeting delegates the praesidium to pursue a restructure of the federation under VISION 2012
- 2010 Launches the IDSF Professional Division
- 2011 Changes name to WDSF on 19 June

== Members ==
=== Regions ===
The WDSF has 97 national member associations (On 5 October 2023: 14 in Americas, 48 in Europe, 2 in Oceania, 11 in Africa and 20 in Asia), 76 of which are recognised by their National Olympic Committee. 77 of them are full members while 20 are provisional members:

1. Asia (17+3): DanceSport Asia (DSA-1996-Taipei, Taiwan): India-China-Kyrgyzstan-Kazakhstan-Hong Kong-Indonesia-Japan-South Korea-Lebanon-Macau-Malaysia-Philippines-Singapore-Thailand-Uzbekistan-Vietnam + (Cambodia-Mongolia-Turkmenistan)
2. Oceania (2+0): DanceSport Oceania (DSO): Australia-New Zealand
3. Africa (3+8): DanceSport Africa: Botswana-South Africa-Lesotho + (Namibia-Cameroon-Democratic Republic of Congo-Morocco-Senegal-Tunisia-Uganda-Zimbabwe)
4. Europe (47+1): DanceSport Europe (DSE-Stuttgart, GER): Albania-Russia-Ukraine-Armenia-Austria-Azerbaijan-Belarus-Belgium-Bulgaria-Croatia-Cyprus-Czech Republic-Poland-England-Luxembourg-Ireland-Serbia-Slovenia-Denmark-Germany-Estonia-Portugal-Andorra-France-Italy-Finland-Georgia-Hungary-Iceland-Israel-Latvia-Liechtenstein-Lithuania-Macedonia-Malta-Moldova-Montenegro-Greece-Netherlands-Norway-Romania-San Marino-Switzerland-Slovakia-Spain-Sweden-Türkiye + (Bosnia and Herzegovina)
5. Americas (6+8): DanceSport Americas: Argentina-Canada-United States-Colombia-Ecuador-Trinidad and Tobago + (Guatemala-Panama-Uruguay-Brazil-Peru-Chile-Dominican Republic-El Salvador)

Associate Member: World Rock'n'Roll Confederation

=== Full members ===
Country	Member name	NOC recognized
Albania	Albanian Dance Sport Federation	Yes
Argentina	Asociación Argentina de Baile Deportivo	No
Armenia	Armenian Dance Sport Federation	Yes
Australia	Dancesport Australia Ltd.	Yes
Austria	Austrian DanceSport Federation	No
Azerbaijan	Azerbaijan Dance Sport Federation	Yes
Belarus	Belarusian Dance Sport Federation	Yes
Belgium	Belgian Dancesport Federation	Yes
Bosnia and Herzegovina	Dance Sport Association of Bosnia and Herzegovina	No
Bulgaria	Bulgarian Dance Sport Federation	No
Canada	Canada DanceSport	Yes
Colombia	Colombian DanceSport Federation	Yes
Chile	Federación Chilena de Baile Deportivo y Competición	Yes
People's Republic of China	Chinese DanceSport Federation	Yes
Chinese Taipei	Chinese Taipei DanceSport Federation	Yes
Croatia	Croatian DanceSport Federation	Yes
Cyprus	Cyprus Federation of Social and Sport Dance	Yes
Czech Republic	Czech Dance Sport Federation	Yes
Denmark	Danmarks Sportdanserforbund	Yes
Ecuador	Federación Ecuatoriana de Baile Deportivo	Yes
England	DanceSport England	No
Estonia	Estonian DanceSport Union	Yes
Finland	Finnish Dance Sport Association	Yes
France	Fédération Française de Danse	Yes
Georgia	Georgian National DanceSport Federation	Yes
Germany	Deutscher Tanzsportverband e.V.,	Yes
Greece	National DanceSport Federation of Greece	No
Hong Kong	Hong Kong DanceSport Association Limited	Yes
Hungary	Hungarian Dancesport Association	Yes
Iceland	Icelandic Dance Sport Federation, DSI	Yes
India	All India Dance Sport Federation	No
Indonesia	Indonesian Dancesport Association, IODI	Yes
Ireland	DanceSport Ireland, LTD	No
Israel	The Israel Dance Sport Association	Yes
Italy	Federazione Italiana Danza Sportiva	Yes
Japan	Japan DanceSport Federation	Yes
Kazakhstan	National Association of Dance of Kazakhstan	Yes
Kyrgyzstan	Dance Sport Federation of the Kyrgyz Republic	Yes
Latvia	Latvian Dance Sport Federation	Yes
Lebanon	Lebanese Dance Sport Federation	Yes
Lesotho	Lesotho Dance Sport Association	Yes
Liechtenstein	Liechtensteiner Tanzsportverband	Yes
Lithuania	Lithuanian Dance Sport Federation	Yes
Luxembourg	DanceSport Federation Luxembourg	Yes
Macao	Macau DanceSport Federation	Yes
Macedonia	Macedonian Dance Sport Federation	No
Malaysia	Malaysia DanceSport Federation	No
Malta	Malta Dancesport Association	Yes
Mexico	Federation Mexicana De Baile A.C.	No
Moldova	Moldova Dance Sport Federation	Yes
Monaco	The Monaco DanceSport Association Stade Louis II	No
Mongolia	The Mongolia DanceSport Federation	Yes
Montenegro	Montenegro Dance Sport Federation	Yes
Nepal	Nepal Breakin and Dance Sports Association	No
Netherlands	Nederlandse Algemene Danssport Bond	Yes
New Zealand	New Zealand Dancesport Association	Yes
Norway	Norges Danseforbund	Yes
Philippines	DanceSport Council of the Philippines, Inc	Yes
Poland	Dance Sport Federation Poland	Yes
Portugal	Federacao Portuguesa de Danca Desportiva	Yes
Romania	Romanian DanceSport Federation	Yes
Russia	All Russian Federation of DanceSport and Acrobatic Rock'n'Roll	Yes
San Marino	San Marino DanceSport Federation	No
Scotland	DanceSport Scotland	No
Serbia	DanceSport Federation of Serbia	Yes
Singapore	Singapore DanceSport Federation	Yes
Slovakia	Slovak Dance Sport Federation	Yes
Slovenia	Slovene Dancesport Federation	Yes
South Africa	Federation of Dance Sport South Africa	Yes
South Korea	Korean Federation of DanceSport	Yes
Spain	Spanish DanceSport Federation	Yes
Sweden	Svenska Danssportförbundet	Yes
Switzerland	Schweizer Tanzsport Verband	Yes
Thailand	Thailand DanceSport Association	Yes
Trinidad and Tobago	National Ballroom Dance Association of Trinidad and Tobago	Yes
Turkey	Turkish DanceSport Federation	No
Uganda	Uganda DanceSport Federation	Yes
Ukraine	All Ukrainian DanceSport Federation	Yes
United States	USA Dance	Yes
Uzbekistan	Uzbekistan Dance Sport Federation	Yes
Vietnam	Vietnam DanceSport Association	Yes
Wales	DanceSport Wales	No

=== Provisional members ===
Country	Member name	NOC recognized
Bosnia and Herzegovina	The Association of Sports Dance Clubs in Bosnia and Herzegovina	No
Bolivia	Federacion Boliviana de Baile Deportivo	No
Brazil	Conselho Nacional de Dança Desportiva e de Salão	No
Cameroon	Fédération Camerounaise Des Danses Sportives et Assimilé	Yes
Cambodia	Cambodian DanceSport Federation	Yes
Dominican Republic	Federacion Dominicana Baile de Salón Deportivo	Yes
Guatemala	Asociación Deportiva Nacional de Baile de Guatemala	No
Mongolia	Mongolian Dancesport Federation	Yes
Panama	Asociación Panameña de Baile Deportivo	Yes
Peru	Federación Deportiva de Danza Deportiva	No
Turkmenistan	Turkmenistan Federation of DanceSport	Yes
Uruguay	Asociación Uruguaya de DanceSport	No
Zimbabwe	Zimbabwe Amateur Dance Sport Association	No

=== Associate members ===
Country	Member name
International federation, legal seat Switzerland	World Rock 'n' Roll Confederation

== Sport directors ==
Name	Country	Directorship
Heinz Speaker	Germany	1994 - 10 June 2010
Marcus Sietas	Spain	10 June 2010 - 31 December 2016
Thomas Shaughnessy	Ireland	21 January 2017 - 21 January 2018
Nenad Jeftić	Serbia	21 January 2018 – present

== Membership in other organisations ==
- Global Association of International Sports Federations (GAISF; formerly SportAccord)
- International World Games Association (IWGA)
- Association of IOC Recognised International Sports Federations (ARISF)
- International Masters Games Association (IMGA)

== Relationship with the World Dance Council ==
The WDSF is not the only international organisation in the field of competitive dance: the World Dance Council (WDC) is another prominent international dance organisation.

In the past, the WDC focus was on administering professional dancers and competitions. However, the launch of the WDC Amateur League in 2007 put the two organisations in direct conflict. The launch of the IDSF Professional Division in 2010 has since become an additional point of conflict.

The WDSF formerly prohibited its members from participating in any competition that is not listed and registered by either WDSF or a WDSF National Member Body. WDC competitions fall into this prohibited category. This policy was revoked in 2012 at the Annual Meeting by vote of the members and since then WDSF encourages athletes to support only WDSF DanceSport and imposes certain restrictions on athletes who compete outside the WDSF DanceSport system.

Like the WDC, WDSF bans same-sex couples from entering competitions, under rule D2.1.1, which states a couple must consist of a man and a woman.

== Publications ==
The International News (Tanzsportmagazin), which served as WDSF's official publication since 1998, was replaced in 2004 by DanceSport Today, and in 2009 by World DanceSport magazine.

== See also ==
- List of dance organizations
- SportAccord
- Association of IOC Recognised International Sports Federations
- List of DanceSport dances
- Formation dance
- Ballroom dance
- Dance basic topics
- Wheelchair DanceSport
