= Dancesport at the World Games =

Dancesport has been part of the World Games since the 1997 edition. Among the disciplines are Standard, Latin, Salsa and Rock'n'Roll.

== Medalists ==
=== Standard ===
Games	Gold	Silver	Bronze
1997 Lahti	Great Britain (GBR); Hazel Newberry; Christopher Hawkins	Italy (ITA); Alessandra Bucciarelli; William Pino	Germany (GER); Pia David; Stefan Ossenkop
2001 Akita	Great Britain (GBR); Kylie Jones; Jonathan Crossley	Italy (ITA); Alessia Betti; Mirko Gozzoli	Lithuania (LTU); Edita Daniūtė; Arūnas Bižokas
2005 Duisburg	Lithuania (LTU); Edita Daniūtė; Arūnas Bižokas	Germany (GER); Natascha Karabey; Sascha Karabey	Italy (ITA); Silvia Pitton; Paolo Bosco
2009 Kaohsiung	Italy (ITA); Silvia Pitton; Paolo Bosco	Germany (GER); Claudia Koehler; Benedetto Ferruggia	Russia (RUS); Alina Basyuk; Marat Gimaev
2013 Cali	Germany (GER); Benedetto Ferruggia; Claudia Koehler	Russia (RUS); Sergei Konovaltsev; Olga Konovaltseva	Italy (ITA); Rosario Guerra; Grazia Benincasa
2017 Wrocław	Germany (GER); Benedetto Ferruggia; Claudia Koehler	Russia (RUS); Dmitry Zharkov; Olga Kulikova	Lithuania (LTU); Evaldas Sodeika; Ieva Žukauskaitė
2022 Birmingham	Lithuania; Ieva Sodeikienė; Evaldas Sodeika	Italy; Debora Pacini; Francesco Galuppo	Lithuania; Veronika Golodneva; Vaidotas Lacitis

=== Latin ===
Games	Gold	Silver	Bronze
1997 Lahti	Denmark (DEN); Mie Bach; Steen Lund	Slovenia (SLO); Katerina Venturini; Andrej Skufca	Finland (FIN); Katja Koukkula; Jussi Väänänen
2001 Akita	Slovenia (SLO); Katerina Venturini; Andrej Skufca	Russia (RUS); Anna Bezikova; Dmitriy Timokhin	United States (USA); Maria Manusova; Eugene Katsevman
2005 Duisburg	United States (USA); Maria Manusova; Eugene Katsevman	Denmark (DEN); Kristina Juel-Stokkebrø; Peter Stokkebrø	Italy (ITA); Annalisa di Filippo; Stefano di Filippo
2009 Kaohsiung	Russia (RUS); Anna Firstova; Alexey Silde	Slovenia (SLO); Jagoda Štrukelj; Jurij Batagelj	Italy (ITA); Antonia Goffredo; Gabriele Goffredo
2013 Cali	Moldova (MDA); Gabriele Goffredo; Anna Matus	Russia (RUS); Timur Imametdinov; Ekaterina Nikolaeva	France (FRA); Charles-Guillaume Schmitt; Elena Salikhova
2017 Wrocław	Moldova (MDA); Gabriele Goffredo; Anna Matus	Russia (RUS); Armen Tsaturyan; Svetlana Gudyno	France (FRA); Charles-Guillaume Schmitt; Elena Salikhova
2022 Birmingham	Moldova; Anna Matus; Gabriele Pasquale Goffredo	Germany; Khrystyna Moshenska; Marius-Andrei Balan	France; Elena Salikhova; Charles-Guillaume Schmitt

=== Rock 'n' Roll ===
Games	Gold	Silver	Bronze
2005 Duisburg	France (FRA); Diane Eonin; Christophe Payan	Russia (RUS); Olga Sbitneva; Ivan Yudin	France (FRA); Fanny Delebecque; Alexis Chardenoux
2009 Kaohsiung	France (FRA); Kathy Richeta; Christophe Payan	Russia (RUS); Olga Sbitneva; Ivan Yudin	Russia (RUS); Katrin Gazazyan; Ivan Klimov
2017 Wrocław	Poland (POL); Jacek Tarczylo; Anna Miadzielec	Russia (RUS); Konstantin Chistikov; Ksenia Osnovina	Germany (GER); Tobias Bludau; Michelle Uhl
2022 Birmingham	Germany; Michelle Uhl; Tobias Bludau	Switzerland; Noëmi Kuran-Pellegatta; Nicolas Kuran-Pellegatta	Austria; Anna Sturm; Matthias Feichtinger

=== Salsa ===
Games	Gold	Silver	Bronze
2013 Cali	Colombia (COL); Yefersson Benjumea; Adriana Avila	Czech Republic (CZE); Jakub Mazuch; Michaela Gatekova	Italy (ITA); Antonio Berardi; Jasmina Berardi
2017 Wrocław	Colombia (COL); Stevens Rebolledo; Yinessa Ortega	Colombia (COL); Yefersson Benjumea; Adriana Avila	Italy (ITA); Simone Sanfilippo; Serena Maso

=== B-Boys ===
Games	Gold	Silver	Bronze
2022 Birmingham	Victor Montalvo (Victor); United States	Jeffrey Louis (Jeffro); United States	Shigeyuki Nakarai (Shigekix); Japan

=== B-Girls ===
Games	Gold	Silver	Bronze
2022 Birmingham	Ami Yuasa (Ami); Japan	Sunny Choi (Sunny); United States	Ayumi Fukushima (Ayumi); Japan
