= Dancesport at the 2001 World Games =

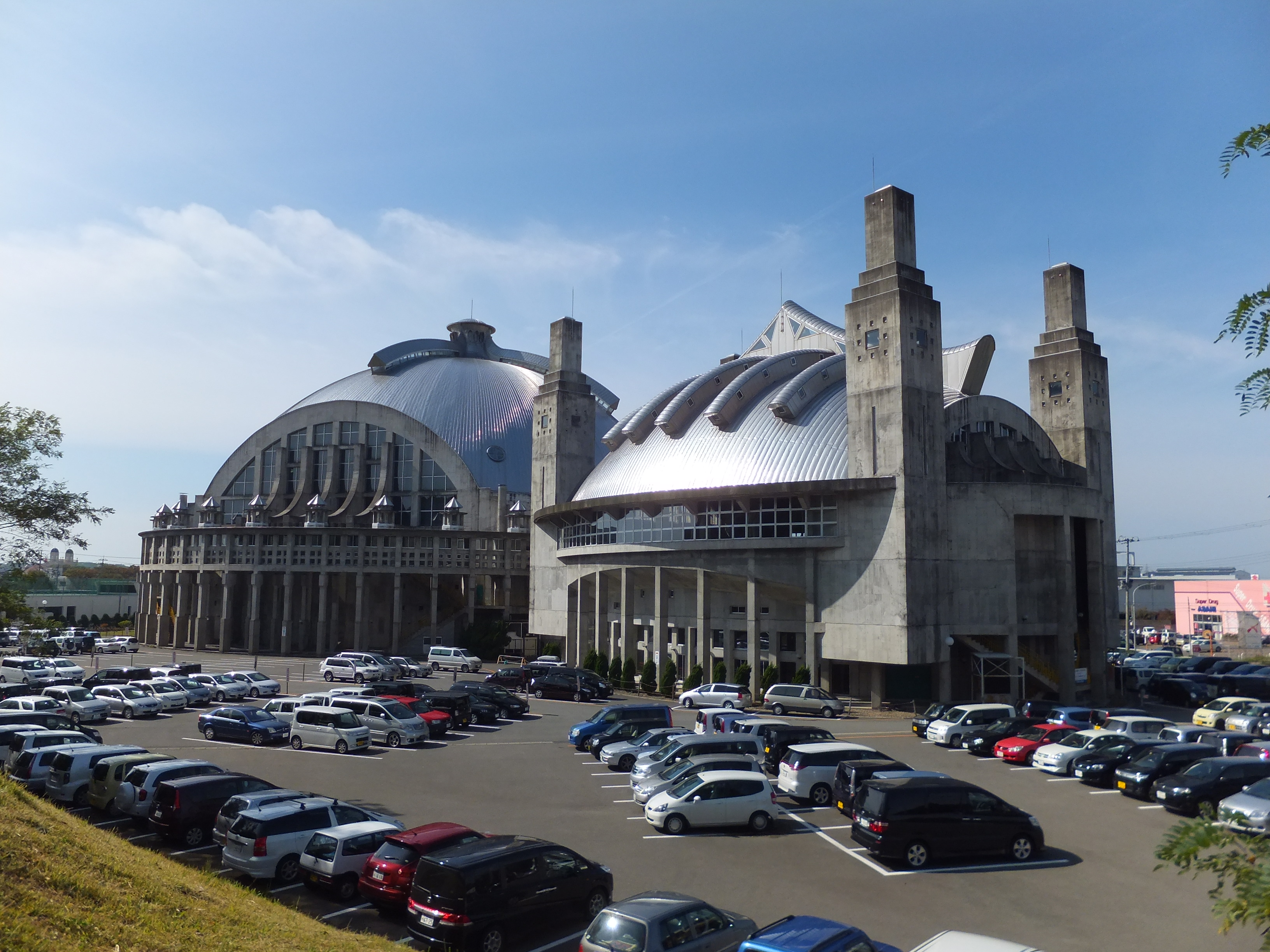
- Akita City Gymnasium
- Venue: Akita City Gymnasium
- Dates: 25–26 August 2001
- Competitors: 94 from 26 nations

The dancesport competitions at the 2001 World Games in Akita was played between 25 and 26 August. 94 dancers, from 26 nations, participated in the tournament. The dancesport competition took place at Akita City Gymnasium.

== Participating nations ==
- Australia (4)
- Austria (4)
- Canada (4)
- China (2)
- Chinese Taipei (4)
- Czech Republic (4)
- Finland (4)
- Great Britain (2)
- Hong Kong (2)
- Italy (4)
- Japan (14)
- Latvia (2)
- Lithuania (4)
- Malaysia (2)
- Netherlands (4)
- New Zealand (2)
- Norway (2)
- Philippines (2)
- Poland (4)
- Russia (4)
- Singapore (4)
- Slovakia (4)
- Slovenia (2)
- South Africa (4)
- Thailand (2)
- United States (4)

== Medal table ==
Rank	Nation	Gold	Silver	Bronze	Total
1	Great Britain	1	0	0	1
1	Slovenia	1	0	0	1
3	Italy	0	1	0	1
3	Russia	0	1	0	1
5	Lithuania	0	0	1	1
5	United States	0	0	1	1
Totals (6 entries)		2	2	2	6

== Events ==
Event	Gold	Silver	Bronze
Standard	Great Britain; Jonathan Crossley; Kylie Jones	Italy; Mirko Gozzoli; Alessia Betti	Lithuania; Arūnas Bižokas; Edita Daniūtė
Latin	Slovenia; Andrej Škufca; Katarina Venturini	Russia; Dmitry Timokhin; Anna Bezikova	United States; Eugene Katsevman; Maria Manusova
