= Eurovision 2009 (disambiguation) =

The Eurovision Song Contest 2009 was the 54th edition of the Eurovision Song Contest.

Eurovision 2009 may also refer to:

- Junior Eurovision Song Contest 2009, the seventh Junior Eurovision Song Contest, that was held in November 2009
- Third Eurovision Dance Contest, which was originally due to be held in 2009
