= Dancesport at the 2005 World Games – Standard =

Dancesport standard at the 2005 World Games
- Venue: König Pilsener Arena
- Date: 17 July 2005
- Competitors: 48 from 23 nations

Medalists
1st place, gold medalist(s)		Arūnas Bižokas; Edita Daniūtė	Lithuania
2nd place, silver medalist(s)		Sascha Karabey; Natascha Karabey	Germany
3rd place, bronze medalist(s)		Paolo Bosco; Silvia Pitton	Italy

The standard competition in dancesport at the 2005 World Games took place on 17 July 2005 at the König Pilsener Arena in Oberhausen, Germany.

== Competition format ==
A total of 24 pairs entered the competition. Best eleven pairs from round one qualifies directly to the semifinal. In redance additional five pairs qualifies to the semifinal. From semifinal the best six pairs qualifies to the final.

== Calendar ==
Event wook place on 17 July 2005.

== Results ==
Rank	Athletes	Nation	Round 1	Redance	Semifinal	Final
1st place, gold medalist(s)	Arūnas Bižokas/Edita Daniūtė	Lithuania	Q		Q	1
2nd place, silver medalist(s)	Sascha Karabey/Natascha Karabey	Germany	Q		Q	2
3rd place, bronze medalist(s)	Paolo Bosco/Silvia Pitton	Italy	Q		Q	3
4	Maxim Kotlov/Elena Uspenskaia	Russia	Q		Q	4
5	Andrzej Sadecki/Karina Nawrot	Poland	Q		Q	5
6	Miša Cigoj/Anastazija Novozilova	Slovenia	Q		Q	6
7	Andrej Mosejcuk/Susanne Miscenko	Germany	Q			
8	Ivan Zderciuk/Olga Ciubari	Moldova	Q			
9	Andrej Hromádka/Aneta Orosiova	Slovakia	Q			
10	Valdis Škutāns/Laura Kosite	Latvia	Q			
11	Csaba László/Szilvia Szögi	Hungary		Q		
12	Masayuki Ishihara/Megumi Saito	Japan		Q		
13	Martin Dvořák/Zuzana Sihanova	Czech Republic		Q		
13	Dmytro Vlokh/Olga Uromova	Ukraine	Q			
15	Florian Gschaider/Manuela Stöckl	Austria		Q		
16	Aleksander Makarov/Katrin End	Estonia		Q		
17	Alexandre Chalkevitch/Larisa Kerbel	Canada				
18	Matthew Rooke/Anna Longmore	Australia				
18	Sami Vainionpää/Merje Styff	Finland				
20	Isaac Rovira/Desiree Martin	Spain				
21	Eric Chao/Cherry Kao	Chinese Taipei				
21	Philipp Porter/Kerri Porter	New Zealand				
21	Regardt Van der Merwe/Lana Isaacks	South Africa				
21	Andrew Tate/Michelle Tate	United States				
