= Speech of Vladimir Putin =

Speech of Vladimir Putin may refer to:

- 2007 Munich speech of Vladimir Putin
- Crimean speech of Vladimir Putin (2014)
- Address concerning the events in Ukraine (21 February 2022)
- On conducting a special military operation (24 February 2022)

== See also ==
- Presidential Address to the Federal Assembly
- Direct Line with Vladimir Putin
