= Dancesport at the 2001 World Games – Standard =

Dancesport standard at the 2001 World Games
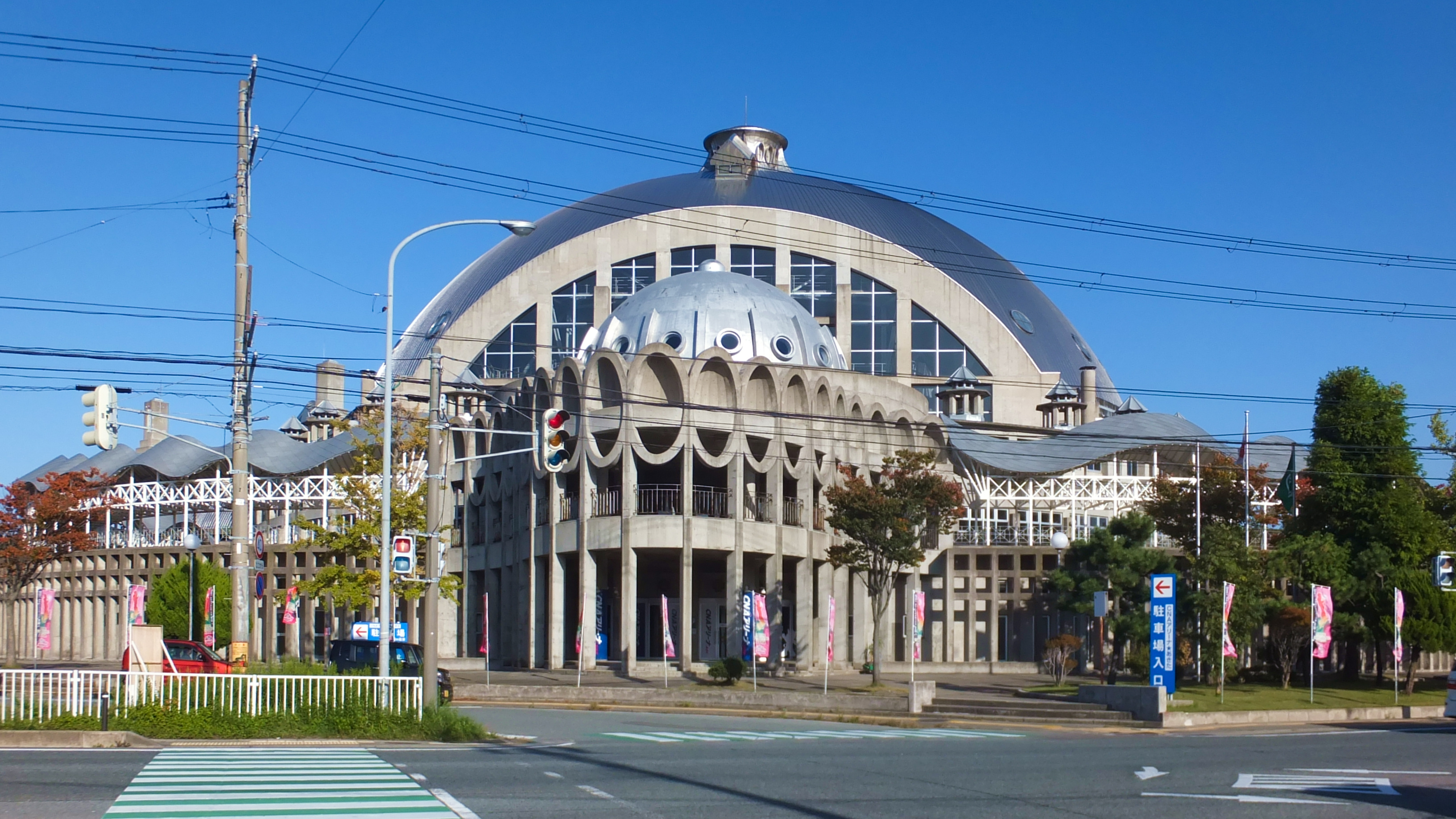
- Akita City Gymnasium
- Venue: Akita City Gymnasium
- Date: 25 August 2001
- Competitors: 48 from 22 nations

Medalists
| 1st place, gold medalist(s) | | Jonathan Crossley; Kylie Jones | Great Britain |
| 2nd place, silver medalist(s) | | Mirko Gozzoli; Alessia Betti | Italy |
| 3rd place, bronze medalist(s) | | Arūnas Bižokas; Edita Daniūtė | Lithuania |

The standard competition in dancesport at the 2001 World Games took place on 25 August 2001 at the Akita City Gymnasium in Akita, Japan.

== Competition format ==
A total of 24 pairs entered the competition. Best ten pairs from round one qualifies directly to the semifinal. In redance additional four pairs qualifies to the semifinal. From semifinal the best six pairs qualifies to the final.

== Results ==
| Rank | Athletes | Nation | Round 1 | Redance | Semifinal | Final |
|---|---|---|---|---|---|---|
| 1st place, gold medalist(s) | Jonathan Crossley/Kylie Jones | (United Kingdom) Great Britain | 34 | | 35 | 7 |
| 2nd place, silver medalist(s) | Mirko Gozzoli/Alessia Betti | Italy | 32 | | 34 | 8 |
| 3rd place, bronze medalist(s) | Arūnas Bižokas/Edita Daniūtė | Lithuania | 34 | | 35 | 16 |
| 4 | Hirohumi Amano/Kyoko Amano | Japan | 29 | | 28 | 22 |
| 5 | Pavel Dvořák/Jitka Wallischová | Czech Republic | 31 | | 26 | 24 |
| 6 | Alexey Galchun/Tatiana Damina | Russia | 26 | | 20 | 28 |
| 7 | Andrej Hromadka/Silvia Kandarova | Slovakia | 23 | | 13 | |
| 8 | Aleksi Seppänen/Sanna-Maria Räisänen | Finland | 22 | | 8 | |
| 8 | Kai Andre Lillebø/Lena Granaas Lillebø | Norway | 32 | | 8 | |
| 10 | Łukasz Pawlak/Katarzyna Horodecka | Poland | 26 | | 3 | |
| 11 | Florian Gschaider/Manuela Stöckl | Austria | 14 | 30 | 0 | |
| 11 | Alexandre Chalkevitch/Larissa Kerbel | Canada | 7 | 20 | 0 | |
| 11 | Kazuaki Watanabe/Yumi Watanabe | Japan | 6 | 20 | 0 | |
| 11 | Kazuki Sugaya/Ikuyo Sugaya | Japan | 11 | 25 | 0 | |
| 15 | Xander Jager/Yvette Jager | Netherlands | 8 | 12 | | |
| 16 | Takeo Wachi/Kiriko Wachi | Japan | 5 | 11 | | |
| 17 | Eamon McGrath/Anita Filley | Australia | 4 | 8 | | |
| 17 | Wei Wei/Guo Yage | China | 1 | 8 | | |
| 19 | Craig Messina/Denia Damonze | South Africa | 1 | 3 | | |
| 20 | Peter Chen/Tiffany Lee | Chinese Taipei | 0 | 2 | | |
| 21 | Mark Sheldon/Mercedes von Deck | United States | 2 | 1 | | |
| 22 | Stephen So/Cheng Kong Hung | Hong Kong | 1 | 0 | | |
| 22 | Eric Tan/Ivy Por | Malaysia | 1 | 0 | | |
| 22 | Leong Kar Lee/Christine Chang | Singapore | 0 | 0 | | |
