= Hazel Newberry =

British dancer

Hazel Newberry MBE
Personal information
- Nationality: British
- Born: 28 November 1977 (age 48) Barrow-in-Furness, Cumbria, England
Medal record
Dancesport
Representing Great Britain
World Games
Gold medal – first place	1997 Lahti	Standard

Hazel Catherine Newberry is a United Kingdom ballroom dancer and dance teacher. She was three times undefeated World Professional Ballroom champion, dancing with Christopher Hawkins (2002–2004).

The couple also won the International Professional Ballroom Championship in London in 2002 and 2003. This couple also won the European, Open British, UK, US Open and Asian Open.

Newberry won both World and European Amateur Ballroom championships with Hawkins, in 1997. Newberry's career as an amateur concluded with thirteen successive victories in championship events in Europe and the USA, during 1997, including the World Games.

From 2008, Newberry danced with Jonathan Wilkins. The two came second in the 2008 Embassy Ball World Cup Standard competition, behind Wilkins' former partner, Katusha Demidova, and Demidova's new partner, Arunas Bizokas.

In 2009 Newberry and Jonathan Wilkins won the European Championships held at the Kremlin, Moscow, and came second in the WDC Professional Ballroom Championship, held in Japan. The winners were Arunas Bizokas and Katusha Demidova. Newberry and Wilkins have now announced their retirement from competitive dancing.

Hazel Newberry was appointed MBE in 2007 for services to Ballroom dancing.

== Strictly Come Dancing ==
Newberry appeared in the second series of Strictly Come Dancing, partnering Quentin Willson. They were the first couple to be knocked out of the competition, and made the lowest score in Strictly Come Dancing, which still stands to this day, with a total of 8 out of 40 for their Cha-cha-cha.
