= Talk with Dmitry Medvedev =

2008–2019 Russian television series

- Medvedev on the show in 2012.
- Created by: Dmitry Medvedev
- Written by: Konstantin Ernst
- Directed by: Natalia Timakova
- Starring: Dmitry Medvedev (Responding); Yekaterina Andreeva; Sergei Brilov (Host); Ernst Matskyavichius (Host); Maria Sittel (Host); Kirill Kleimenov (Host)
- Country of origin: Russia
- Original language: Russian
- No. of seasons: 12

Production
- Executive producers: Tatyana Remezova; Ivan Kudryatsev; Maria Morgun; Dmitry Shchugorev; Maria Kitaeeva; Anna Pavlova
- Producer: Oleg Dobrodeev
- Production locations: Ostankino, Moscow
- Running time: 1.5 hours
- Production company: VGTRK

Original release
- Network: RT; OTR; Russia-1; Russia 24; RT; Channel One Russia
- Release: December 24, 2008 – December 5, 2019

Talk with Dmitry Medvedev (Russian: Разговор с Дмитрием Медведевым, romanized: Razgovor s Dmitriyem Medvedevym) is a television program and a Q&A show featuring Dmitry Medvedev, which was broadcast annually from 2008 to 2019 on the television channels Russia-1, Russia 24, RT and Channel One Russia, as well as by Mayak, Vesti FM and Radio of Russia radio stations. The Press Secretary Service of Medvedev, who served as Prime Minister of the Russian Federation from 2012 to 2020, supported and directed the broadcasts. During Medvedev's term as President of Russia from 2008 to 2012, the show was called "Results of the Year with the President of Russia" (Russian: Итоги года с Президентом России).

The Russian President Vladimir Putin features in an equivalent broadcast named Direct Line with Vladimir Putin.
