= Dancesport at the 2005 World Games =

- Venue: König Pilsener Arena
- Dates: 16–17 July 2001
- Competitors: 134 from 36 nations

The dancesport competitions at the 2005 World Games in Duisburg was held between 16 and 17 July. 134 dancers from 36 nations, participated in the tournament. The dancesport competition took place at König Pilsener Arena in Oberhausen near Duisburg.

== Participating nations ==
- Australia (4)
- Austria (4)
- Belgium (2)
- Bulgaria (2)
- Canada (2)
- China (2)
- Chinese Taipei (4)
- Croatia (4)
- Czech Republic (8)
- Denmark (2)
- Estonia (2)
- Finland (4)
- France (6)
- Germany (8)
- Hungary (4)
- Israel (2)
- Italy (4)
- Japan (4)
- Latvia (4)
- Lithuania (4)
- Luxembourg (2)
- Moldova (4)
- New Zealand (2)
- Norway (2)
- Philippines (2)
- Poland (4)
- Russia (8)
- Slovakia (4)
- Slovenia (6)
- Sweden (2)
- Switzerland (4)
- South Africa (4)
- Spain (4)
- Thailand (2)
- Ukraine (4)
- United States (4)

== Medal table ==
Rank	Nation	Gold	Silver	Bronze	Total
1	France	1	0	1	2
2	Lithuania	1	0	0	1
2	United States	1	0	0	1
4	Denmark	0	1	0	1
4	Germany	0	1	0	1
4	Russia	0	1	0	1
7	Italy	0	0	2	2
Totals (7 entries)		3	3	3	9

== Events ==
Event	Gold	Silver	Bronze
Standard	Lithuania; Arūnas Bižokas; Edita Daniūtė	Germany; Sascha Karabey; Natascha Karabey	Italy; Paolo Bosco; Silvia Pitton
Latin	United States; Eugene Katsevman; Maria Manusova	Denmark; Peter Stokkebroe; Kristina Juel Stokkebroe	Italy; Stefano Di Filippo; Annalisa Di Filippo
Rock'n'Roll	France; Christophe Payan; Diane Eonin	Russia; Ivan Yudin; Olga Sbitneva	France; Alexis Chardenoux; Fanny Delebecque
