= Eurovision 2010 (disambiguation) =

The Eurovision Song Contest 2010 was the 55th edition of the Eurovision Song Contest.

Eurovision 2010 may also refer to:

- Junior Eurovision Song Contest 2010, the eighth Junior Eurovision Song Contest that was held in November 2010
- Third Eurovision Dance Contest, which was originally postponed to 2010
