= Eurovision 2007 (disambiguation) =

The Eurovision Song Contest 2007 was the 52nd edition of the Eurovision Song Contest.

Eurovision 2007 may also refer to:

- Eurovision Dance Contest 2007, the first Eurovision Dance Contest that was held in September 2007
- Junior Eurovision Song Contest 2007, the fifth Junior Eurovision Song Contest that was held in December 2007
