= Maria Sittel =

Russian journalist, television presenter and radio host (born 1975)

- Мария Ситтель
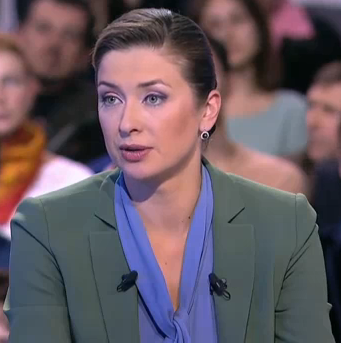
- Sittel broadcast a special program "Direct Line with Vladimir Putin" live on the Russia-1 TV channel in 2014
- Born: Maria Eduardovna Sittel; November 9, 1975 (age 51); Penza, RSFSR, USSR
- Occupations: Journalist; television presenter

Maria Eduardovna Sittel (Russian: Мари́я Эдуа́рдовна Си́ттель; born November 9, 1975) is a Russian television presenter and the journalist an anchor on the Vesti program at Russia-1. She won the Russian TEFI award.

== Early life and education ==
Sittel was born on November 9, 1975, in Penza, Russian SFSR, Soviet Union. She is the daughter of Eduard Anatolyevich Sittel, who has German ancestry, and Larisa Pavlovna.

Sittel studied at the Penza Medical Lyceum until 1993, when she transferred to the V. G. Belinsky Penza Institute of Teacher Education and majored in biology and chemistry. Later, she graduated from the All-Russian State Distance-Learning Institute of Finance and Economics with a degree in finance and credit.

== Career ==
Sittel began her television career in 1997 in her hometown on the program Musical Souvenir on the Penza channel "Our House". In 1998, she became a correspondent and later a news presenter on the Penza Express television channel. In 1999, she started working at State TV and Radio Broadcasting Company in Penza.

From September 24, 2001, to May 14, 2006, Sittel worked as a daily news presenter on Vesti TV channel Russia-1. In September 2003, she replaced Sergey Brilev as the regular nightly newscaster. From 2004 to 2005, she hosted the daily show Osoboe Mnenie ("Minority Report") on Radio Rossii. From May 15, 2006, to June 17, 2016, Sittel presented the nightly news with Dmitry Kiselyov (until July 2008) and Andrey Kondrashov (since September 2008).

Sittel covered the lying-in-state of Boris Yeltsin on April 25, 2007, with Nikolai Svanidze live on Channel One and Russia-1.

From 2008 to 2011, she hosted the annual program Conversation with Vladimir Putin: continued with Ernest Matskyavichus. From September 6, 2009, to December 25, 2011, she hosted the program Special Correspondent. On May 14, 2018, after a two-year break, she returned to the Vesti program.

On 18 March 2022, Sittel, together with Dmitry Guberniev, was the host of the Moscow rally in support of the Russian invasion of Ukraine.

== Participation in other TV projects ==
Sittel has participated in episodes of the TV game show Fort Boyard. In 2006, Maria Sittel and professional dancer Vladislav Borodinov took part in the first season of the television competition Dancing with the Stars in Russia. The couple won first place, which gave them the right to participate at the Eurovision Dance Contest 2007, where they finished in seventh place.

== Personal life ==
Sittel is married to Alexander Lyubomirovich Tereshchenko (b. 1979). She has a younger sister, Anna Sittel, who also works at VGTRK. Until 2013, she was the presenter of the Vesti-Penza programme. Sittel is fond of photography, alpine skiing, sports and reading books.

== Awards ==
- Laureate of the TEFI (2005) award for News programme presenter
- Order of Friendship (June 27, 2007 ) "for her great contribution to the development of Russian television and many years of fruitful work"
- Letter of gratitude from the Government of the Russian Federation (March 31, 2009) "for active participation in the coverage of the activities of the Prime Minister of the Russian Federation"
- Letter of gratitude from the Government of the Russian Federation (March 3, 2012) "for active participation in covering the activities of the Prime Minister of the Russian Federation"
