= Richard Bunn =

American television executive

Richard Bunn is managing director of RBI Network, a Geneva-based consulting firm for television, sport and marketing, established in 2000.

== Career ==
From 1978 to 2000, he was Head of Television Programmes and Controller of Sport at European Broadcasting Union (EBU). He was instrumental in partnership of the European Athletic Association with EBU and British Satellite Broadcasting, which eventually led to the creation of the Eurosport.

The International DanceSport Federation (IDSF) credits the creation of the Eurovision Dance Contest to Mr. Bunn, who convinced the EBU to create this TV program.

In 2001, Richard Bunn was awarded the Olympic Order by the International Olympic Committee for his efforts in promoting sports:

"responsible for negotiating major contracts with the International Federations and overseeing the coordination of the Olympic Movement with the EBU for the past 22 years."
