= Jason Wood (comedian) =

British comedian

- Born: Jason Robert Wood; 21 January 1972; Luton, England, UK
- Died: 20 February 2010 (aged 38); Sundon, Bedfordshire, England, UK

Comedy career
- Years active: 2003–2010

Jason Robert Wood (21 January 1972 – 20 February 2010) was a British comedian. He was a regular performer at the Edinburgh Festival Fringe, he was best known for his comic musical impersonations of performers including Cher and Morrissey. He frequently headlined comedy clubs.

Wood was born in Luton, and attended Icknield High School. In 2004, he took part in the first series of Strictly Come Dancing. He and his partner, professional dancer Kylie Jones, were the first to leave the competition. He was a contestant on the second series of The Underdog Show.

Wood was gay. His show "My Anus Horribilis," its name a play on the Queen's 1992 "Annus Horribilis" Christmas message, was about how "[The Christian right is] pushing the country backwards, and I wanted to point that out. It’s insane when they’re quoting Leviticus to outlaw gay sex, yet most people, who have never read the Bible, won’t know that book also threatens punishment for people who wear shirts of mixed fibre." His Fringe show in 2006 attracted a damning one-star review by The Scotsman newspaper. He referred to this on subsequent posters, quoting, "A star – The Scotsman".

Wood lived with his dog Jim in a cottage in Sundon, Bedfordshire, where he died in his sleep on 20 February 2010 aged 38.
