= Cable Networks Akita =

Japanese cable provider

Coordinates: 39°43′09.8″N 140°5′32.0″E

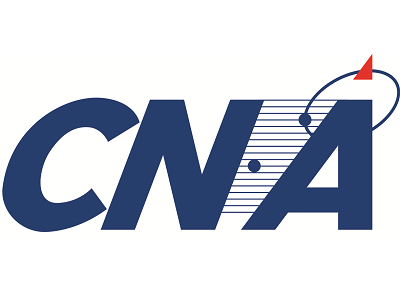

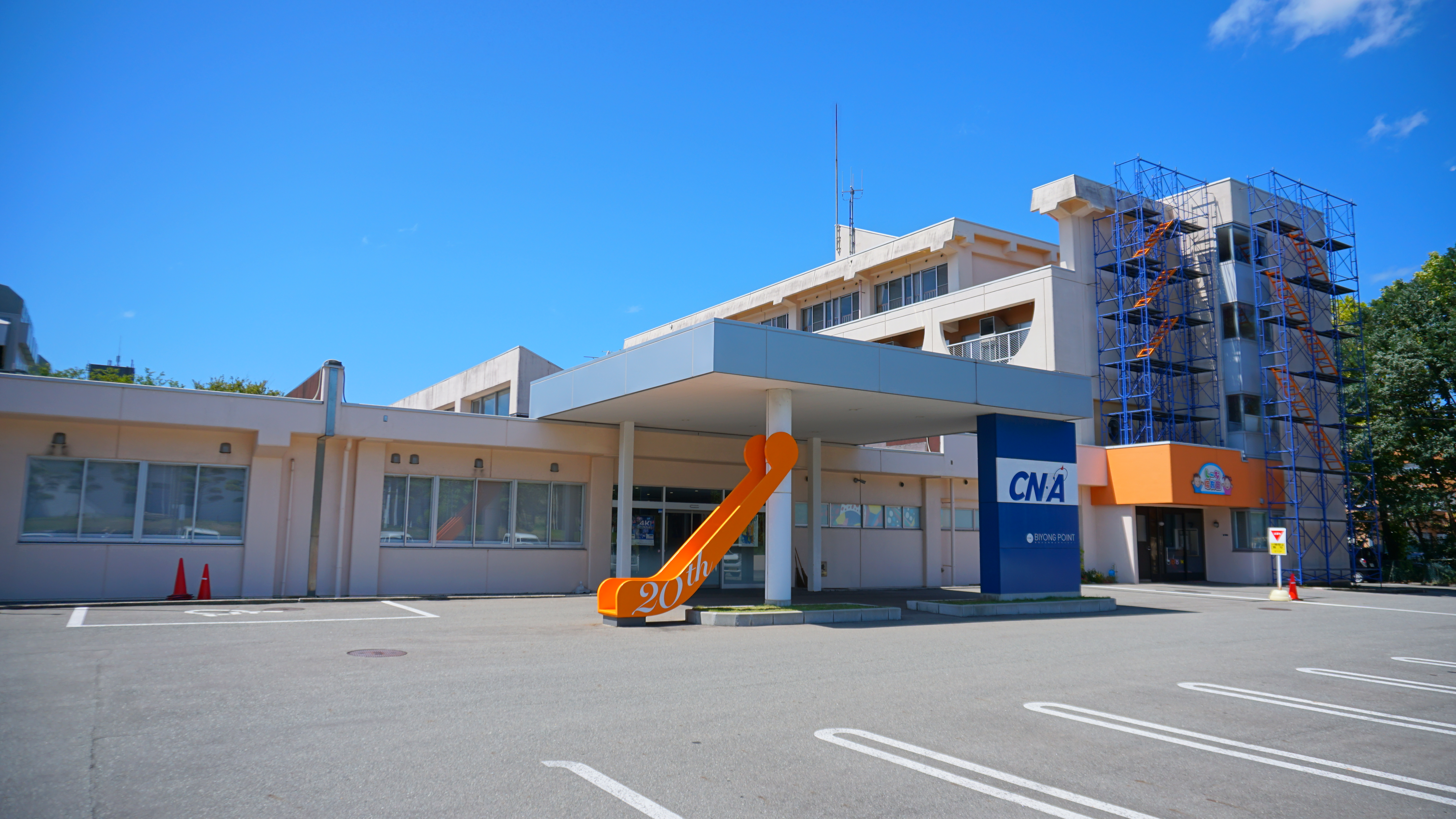
- Type: Kabushiki gaisha
- Industry: Telecommunications
- Founded: 1985
- Headquarters: Akita, Japan
- Area served: cable network operator
- Key people: Ryuichi Matsuura
- Products: Cable-TV, Internet and Telephone Services via broadband
- Revenue: JPY 3,444 million
- Number of employees: 102
- Parent: Noritsu
- Website: http://www.cna.ne.jp/

Cable Networks Akita, also known as CNA and in Japanese as Akita Cable Television (秋田ケーブルテレビ), is a cable provider in Japan with 46,418 connected households as of February 27, 2017. The company was established in June 1985 with investments from local companies; however, due to economic constraints, the company remained inactive before starting regular operations. In 1994, due to deregulation in the broadcast and communications sectors, companies like Nissho Iwai and Nippon Telecom (the current SoftBank) injected capital in 1994 and under the leadership of both companies, its service started on December 1, 1997. They acquired the naming rights of the Akita Municipal Gymnasium, the home of Akita Northern Happinets, in 2015.

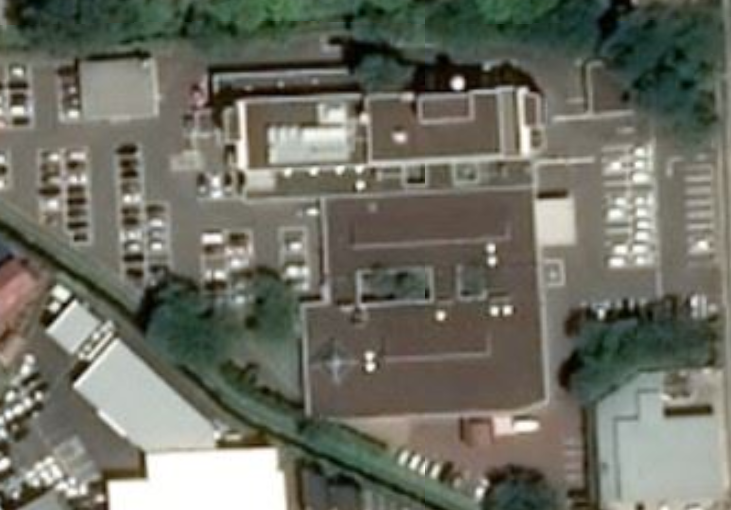
CNA Headquarters

From April 1, 2010, CNA started broadcasting IBC on its network, replacing TUY. Akita does not have a JNN affiliate of its own.

== Location map ==
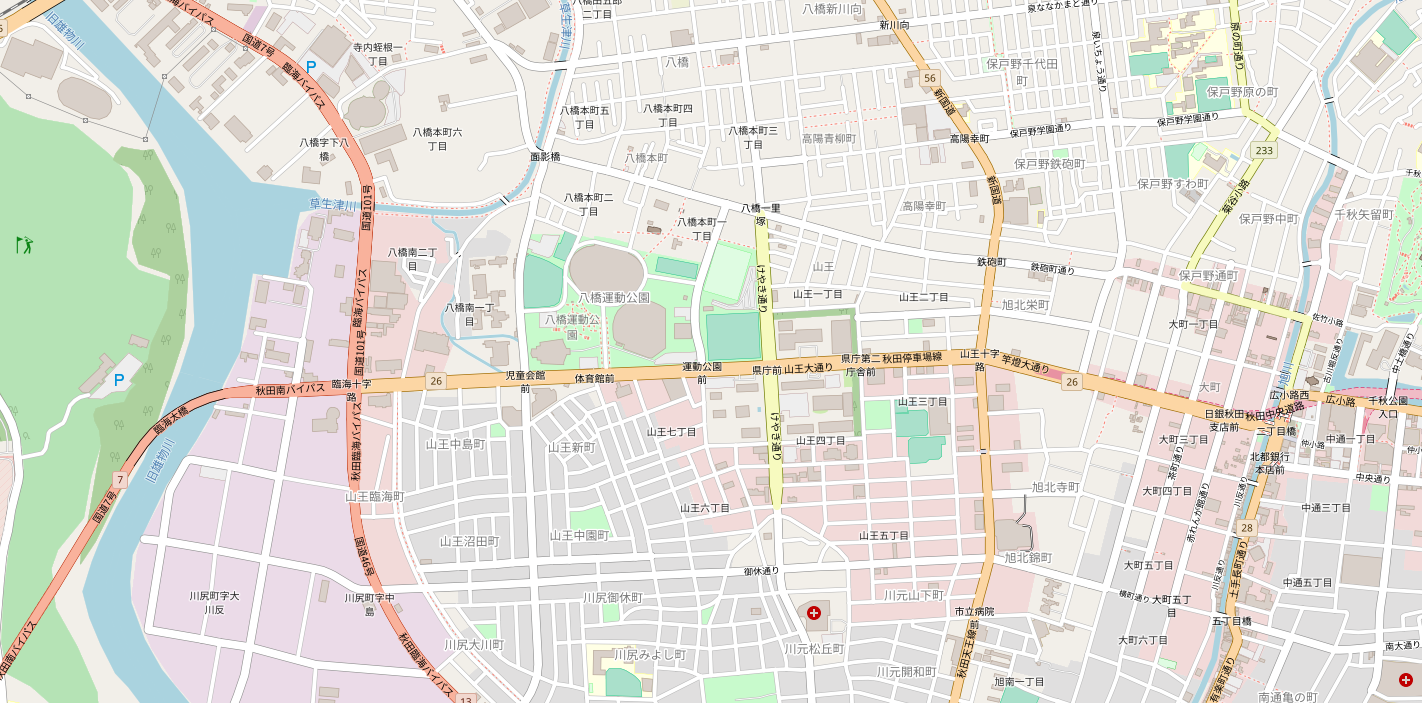
