= Acrobatic gymnastics at the 2001 World Games =

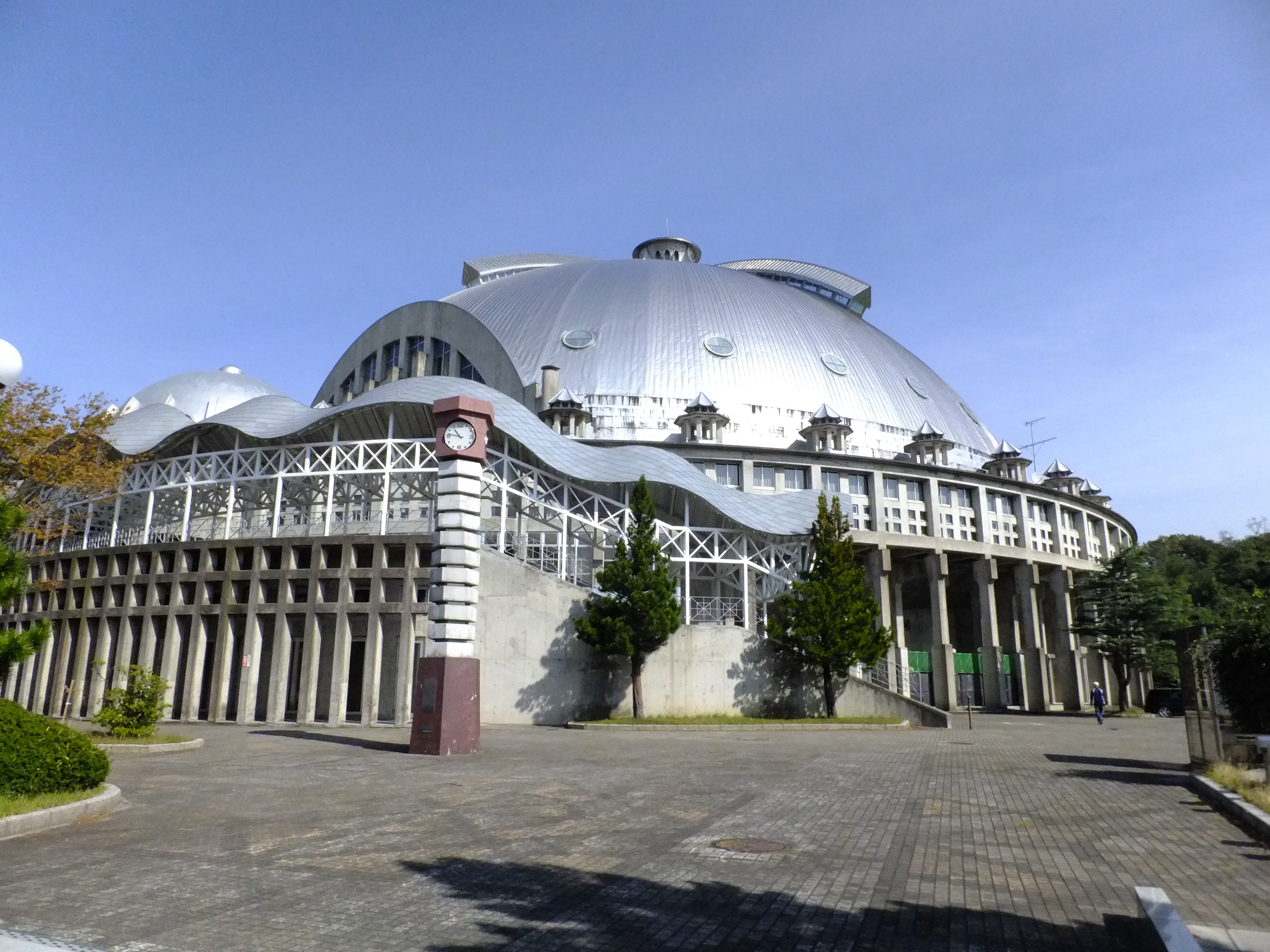
- Akita City Gymnasium
- Venue: Akita City Gymnasium
- Dates: 19–21 August 2001
- Competitors: 75 from 11 nations

The acrobatic gymnastics tournaments at the 2001 World Games in Akita was played between 19 and 21 August. 75 acrobatic gymnastics competitors, from 11 nations, participated in the tournament. The acrobatic gymnastics competition took place at Akita City Gymnasium.

== Participating nations ==
- Belgium (4)
- Belarus (5)
- China (13)
- Great Britain (13)
- Japan (4)
- Kazakhstan (3)
- Lithuania (2)
- Poland (2)
- Portugal (8)
- Russia (13)
- United States (8)

== Medal table ==
Rank	Nation	Gold	Silver	Bronze	Total
1	Russia	4	1	0	5
2	China	1	2	0	3
3	Belgium	0	1	0	1
3	United States	0	1	0	1
5	Belarus	0	0	2	2
5	Great Britain	0	0	2	2
7	Portugal	0	0	1	1
Totals (7 entries)		5	5	5	15

== Events ==
=== Men's events ===
Event	Gold	Silver	Bronze
Group	Russia; Aleksey Shcherbakov; Vadim Galkin; Aleksey Ermichkin; Dmitry Bulkin	China; Yan Song; Liu Feng; Liu Huifeng; Hu Xin	Portugal; Pedro Emídio; João Oliveira; Sérgio Mateus; Vítor Silva
Pair	China; Li Renjie; Song Min	Russia; Aleksandr Privalov; Ivan Poletaev	Belarus; Aliaksei Liubezny; Anatoli Baravikou

=== Women's events ===
Event	Gold	Silver	Bronze
Group	Russia; Svetlana Kushu; Elena Arakelian; Ekaterina Lysenko	China; Huang Cuiling; Feng Jiepeng; Li Caidan	Belarus; Katsiaryna Katsuba; Zinaida Sazonava; Viktoryia Arabei
Pair	Russia; Anna Mokhova; Yulia Lopatkina	Belgium; Aline Van den Weghe; Elke Van Maldegem	Great Britain; Gemma Middleton; Amy Clarke

=== Mixed events ===
Event	Gold	Silver	Bronze
Pair	Russia; Andrey Yakovlev; Polina Lymareva	United States; Julian Amaro; Shenea Booth	Great Britain; Patrick Bonner; Lisa Hobby
