= Dmitry Guberniev =

Russian TV presenter and sports commentator (born 1974)

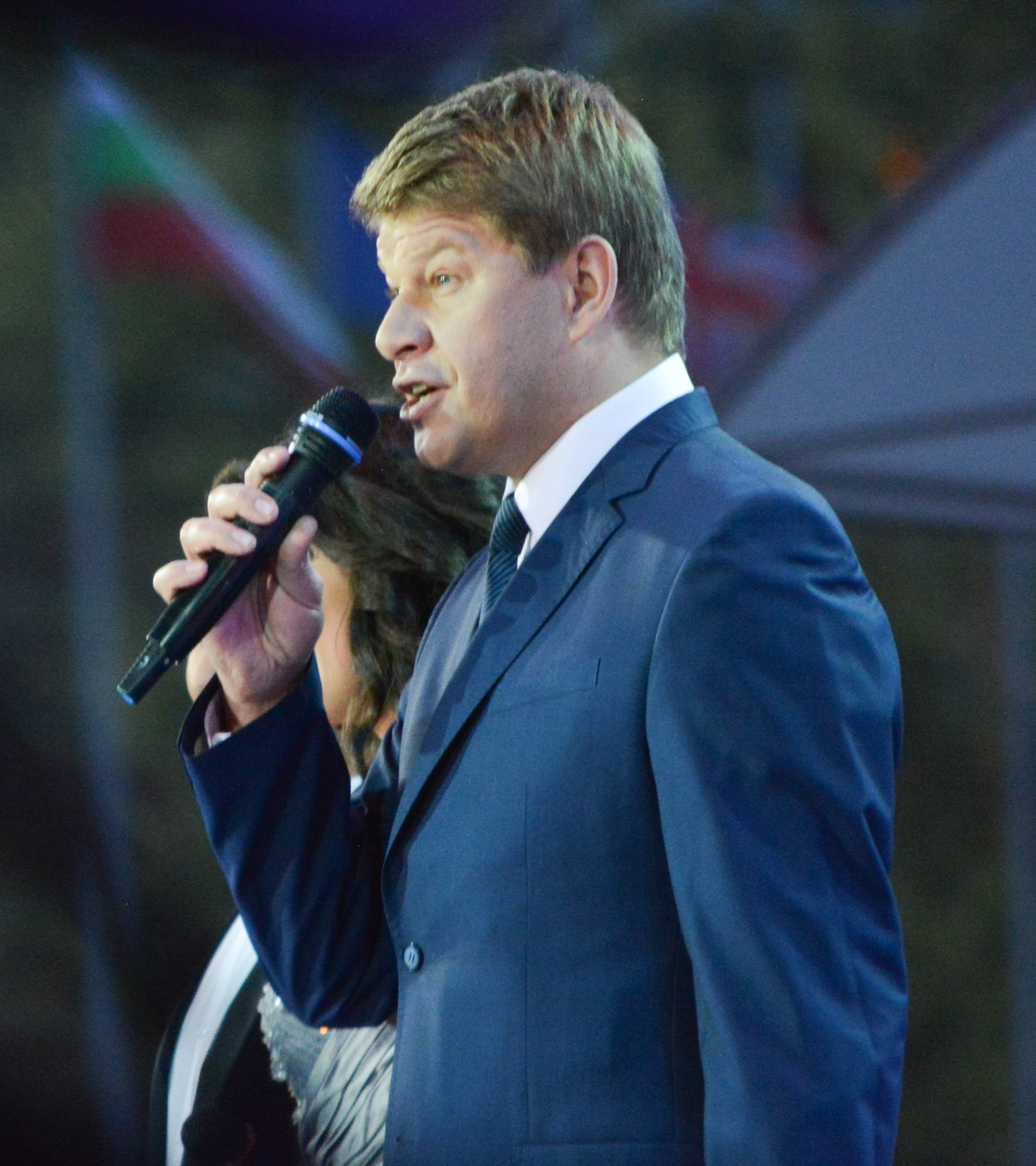
Guberniev at the Slavianski Bazaar in Vitebsk, 2014

Dmitry Viktorovich Guberniev (Russian: Дми́трий Ви́кторович Губе́рниев; born October 6, 1974, Drezna, Moscow Oblast, Russian SFSR, USSR) is a Russian TV presenter, sports commentator of TV channel Match TV. Previously, he was the editor in chief of the Joint Directorate of sports channels VGTRK (2013-2015).

== Awards ==
- TEFI Award winner in 2007, 2015, 2019.
- Journalist of the Year 2012; version Biathlon-Award.

== Personal life ==
He was married to the former track and field champion Olga Bogoslovskaya. He has a son, Mikhail, born in 2002.

Guberniev has gotten himself into trouble a number of times for outbursts on live broadcasts, most notably in 2017 when calling French biathlete Martin Fourcade a pig, for which he later apologised. In 2020, he lashed out at tennis commentator Ekaterina Bychkova, calling her "a stupid, vile creature".

On 18 March 2022, Guberniev, together with Maria Sittel, was the host of the Moscow rally in support of the Russian invasion of Ukraine.
