= Christopher Hawkins (dancer) =

English ballroom dancer and teacher

Christopher Hawkins is a highly respected English ballroom dancer and teacher of competitive ballroom dancing. He won the Professional World Ballroom Dance Championship three times, with Hazel Newberry MBE (2002–2004). The partnership also became champions of the coveted Open British Professional Ballroom Championship at the world renowned Winter Gardens Ballroom in Blackpool. They were also prolific winners of all of the major titles, including the British National, United Kingdom, Asian Open, and European Professional Ballroom Championships. The couple also won the International Professional Ballroom Championship in London in 2002 and 2003.

Before this, he won World, Open British, International, United Kingdom and European Amateur Standard championships with Hazel Newberry MBE, in 1997. His career as an amateur concluded with thirteen successive victories in championship events in Europe and the US, during 1997, including the World Games.

Christopher previously served as Chair of the World Competitors Dancesport Corporation for several years, which subsequently developed into the World Dance Council Competitors Commission under his management. He joined the Modern Ballroom Faculty of the Imperial Society of Teachers of Dancing in 2009 and was elected Modern Ballroom Faculty Chair in October 2015. He proudly represented the Society as a Director of the British Dance Council before being elected as President of the British Dance Council in June 2022. He has subsequently stepped down from his Faculty Committee roles, but maintains the advisory roles of Patron and Dancesport Ambassador for the Imperial Society. He continues his work as President of the British Dance Council.

He is married and teaches out of his studio, ‘Dance Dynamic’ with his wife, Joanne Bolton-Hawkins, also a former British Professional Ballroom Champion and World Professional Classic Showdance Champion.
