= Eurovision Dance Contest 2007 =

International dance competition

Date and venue
- Final: 1 September 2007
- Venue: BBC Television Centre; London, United Kingdom

Organisation
- Organiser: European Broadcasting Union (EBU)
- Executive supervisor: Tal Barnea

Production
- Host broadcaster: British Broadcasting Corporation (BBC)
- Director: Nikki Parsons
- Executive producer: Jane Lush; Fenia Vardanis
- Presenters: Graham Norton; Claudia Winkleman

Participants
- Number of entries: 16
- Debuting countries: Austria; Denmark; Finland; Germany; Greece; Ireland; Lithuania; Netherlands; Poland; Portugal; Russia; Spain; Sweden; Switzerland; Ukraine; United Kingdom
- Participation map: Participating countries

Vote
- Voting system: Each country awards 1–8, 10, and 12 points to their 10 favourite acts.
- Winning dancers: Finland; Katja Koukkula and Jussi Väänänen

The Eurovision Dance Contest 2007 was the inaugural edition of the Eurovision Dance Contest, held on 1 September 2007 at the BBC Television Centre in London, United Kingdom, and presented by Graham Norton and Claudia Winkleman. It was organised by the European Broadcasting Union (EBU) and host broadcaster the British Broadcasting Corporation (BBC). It featured the participation of dance couples from sixteen countries.

Viewers cast their votes by telephone and SMS text message voting on each couple's two dances – the first being ballroom or Latin with the second being freestyle, with a "national" flavour. Professional dance couples were allowed to enter the competition. Enrique Iglesias performed a medley of "Tired of Being Sorry" and "Do You Know? (The Ping Pong Song)" during the interval.

The first ever winners of the contest were Katja Koukkula and Jussi Väänänen representing Finland who received a total of 132 points. 2nd place went to Ukraine, 3rd to Ireland, 4th to Poland and 5th place to Austria following a tie with Portugal, who also received 74 points.

== Location ==
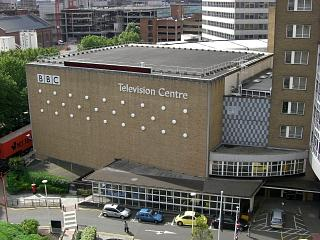
BBC Television Centre, London - host venue of the 2007 contest.

Alongside the announcement as host broadcaster, the host city, venue and presenters for the contest were announced by the British Broadcasting Corporation (BBC) on 13 April 2007.

The host venue was the BBC Television Centre, White City, London, which opened in 1960. It is one of the most readily recognisable facilities of its type having appeared as the backdrop for many BBC programmes. It remained to be one of the largest such facilities in the world until it closed in March 2013. In September 2017, BBC Studioworks re-opened the three studios at Television Centre, alongside a range of post-production facilities and ancillary areas.

Television Centre previously hosted the Eurovision Song Contest 1963 after France, which won the year before, declined to host it due to financial shortcomings, also having hosted the competition in 1959 and 1961. The last time the United Kingdom hosted one of the Eurovision's network Family of Events was the Eurovision Young Dancers 2001, which was also held in London.

== Format ==
=== Host broadcaster ===
The contest was hosted by the BBC, and was a co-production by Splash Media – run by the developers of its successful Strictly Come Dancing format – and sports production house Sunset + Vine – with help from the International DanceSport Federation and in association with the European Broadcasting Union (EBU).

The contest was presented in English and French languages, although France did not take part. Each broadcaster also had the option of providing its own commentators at the event.

=== Visual design ===
The logo of 2007 contest features the word Eurovision written in the same way as it is on the Eurovision Song Contest logos without the heart but included the silhouette of a dancing couple in front of a star that contains the flag of the host country, the United Kingdom.

=== Running order ===
The running order for the sixteen participants was announced on 6 August 2007 and had been determined in two steps. In the first round, the participating countries were drawn into groups, under supervision of an auditor. In the second round, the producers of the contest determined the final running order within the drawn groups to assure variety in the live show.

=== Interval act ===
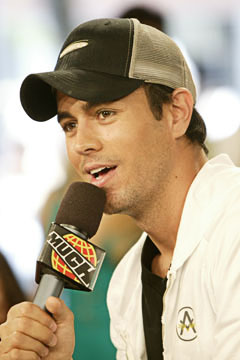
Enrique Iglesias performed as the interval act.

Singer Enrique Iglesias performed a medley of "Tired of Being Sorry" and "Do You Know? (The Ping Pong Song)" as the interval act. The performance was pre-recorded before the live show.

== Participants ==
On 18 January 2007, the EBU officially announced the creation of this new dance contest. At the time, fourteen broadcasters had already expressed their interest in taking part, with a production meeting taking place the day before in London. On 13 April, BBC News Online incorrectly reported that the broadcasters from thirteen countries would compete in the upcoming inaugural contest that autumn; these being Austria, Denmark, Finland, Germany, Ireland, Netherlands, Portugal, Russia, Spain, Sweden, Switzerland, Ukraine, and United Kingdom. Greece, Lithuania, and Poland were not included in the list despite being confirmed as participants. The Croatian broadcaster HRT was one of the fourteen broadcasters that had initially expressed an interest in taking part (alongside Ukraine), but pulled out due to costs and scheduling problems.

On 28 August 2007, a press conference was held with the participation of the competition producers, the show presenters, and all the competing couples. Later the same day, the participants attended the opening reception, which was organised at City Hall, London. Camera dress rehearsals followed over the next few days.

Due to the forest fires in Greece, the Greek broadcaster ERT did not air the show live and therefore used a back-up jury instead of televoting.

Austria and Portugal both finished with the same number of points, however, Austria received points from every other participating nation thus receiving points from more countries than Portugal, hence Austria took 5th place.

Participants and results
R/O	Country	Broadcaster	Dancers	Dance Styles		Points	Place
R/O	Country	Broadcaster	Dancers	Dance 1	Dance 2	Points	Place
1	Switzerland	SRG SSR	Denise Biellmann and Sven Ninnemann	Paso Doble	Swing	0	16
2	Russia	RTR	Mariya Sittel and Vladislav Borodinov	Rumba	Paso Doble	72	7
3	Netherlands	NPO	Alexandra Matteman and Redmond Valk	Cha-Cha-Cha	Rumba	34	12
4	United Kingdom	BBC	Camilla Dallerup and Brendan Cole	Rumba	Freestyle	18	15
5	Austria	ORF	Kelly and Andy Kainz	Jive	Paso Doble	74	5
6	Germany	ARD	Wolke Hegenbarth and Oliver Seefeldt	Samba dance	Freestyle	59	8
7	Greece	ERT	Ourania Kolliou and Spiros Pavlidis	Jive	Sirtaki	31	13
8	Lithuania	LRT	Gabrielė Valiukaitė and Gintaras Svistunavičius	Paso Doble	Traditional Lithuanian Folk Dance	35	11
9	Spain	RTVE	Amagoya Benlloch and Abraham Martinez	Cha-Cha-Cha	Paso Doble	38	10
10	Ireland	RTÉ	Nicola Byrne and Mick Donegan	Jive	Fandango	95	3
11	Poland	TVP	Katarzyna Cichopek and Marcin Hakiel	Cha-Cha-Cha	Showdance	84	4
12	Denmark	DR	Mette Skou Elkjær and David Jørgensen	Rumba	Showdance	38	9
13	Portugal	RTP	Sónia Araújo and Ricardo Silva	Jive	Tango	74	6
14	Ukraine	NTU	Yulia Okropiridze and Illya Sydorenko	Quickstep	Showdance	121	2
15	Sweden	TV4	Cecilia Ehrling and Martin Lidberg	Paso Doble	Disco Fusion	23	14
16	Finland	Yle	Katja Koukkula and Jussi Väänänen	Rumba	Paso Doble	132	1

== Scoreboard ==
The following 16 countries took part, and received the scores shown below.

Voting results
Voting procedure used: 100% televoting 100% jury vote		Total score	Switzerland	Russia	Netherlands	United Kingdom	Austria	Germany	Greece	Lithuania	Spain	Ireland	Poland	Denmark	Portugal	Ukraine	Sweden	Finland
Contestants	Switzerland	0																
Contestants	Russia	72			3	10	3	7		6	4	5	4		8	12		10
Contestants	Netherlands	34	5				7	2	12			2	3					3
Contestants	United Kingdom	18							3	5		7		3				
Contestants	Austria	74	7	3	5	2		10	2	3	3	4	6	8	5	5	4	7
Contestants	Germany	59	10	5	6		10				7		5	7	6	1	2	
Contestants	Greece	31	2	4	1	5	4	5		4			2	1	2		1	
Contestants	Lithuania	35		1		6			4			12	1		1	6	3	1
Contestants	Spain	38	6	2	2				7						12	4		5
Contestants	Ireland	95	1	10	7	8	6	3	1	8	5		10	12	3	8	7	6
Contestants	Poland	84	4	8	4	7	8	12		1	6	10		4		10	10	
Contestants	Denmark	38					1	1	6	7	2	3			4	2	8	4
Contestants	Portugal	74	12	6	8	3	2	8	8	2	12			2		3	6	2
Contestants	Ukraine	121	3	12	10	12	5	6	5	12	8	6	12	6	7		5	12
Contestants	Sweden	23				1					1	1	7	5				8
Contestants	Finland	132	8	7	12	4	12	4	10	10	10	8	8	10	10	7	12	

=== 12 points ===
Below is a summary of all 12 points in the contest:

N.	Contestant	Nation(s) giving 12 points
5	Ukraine	Finland, Lithuania, Poland, Russia, United Kingdom
3	Finland	Austria, Netherlands, Sweden
2	Portugal	Spain, Switzerland
1	Ireland	Denmark
1	Lithuania	Ireland
1	Netherlands	Greece
1	Poland	Germany
1	Russia	Ukraine
1	Spain	Portugal

=== Spokespersons ===
The order in which each country announced their votes was done in alphabetical order of each countries. The spokespersons are shown alongside each country.

1. Austria – Peter L. Eppinger
2. Denmark – Louise Wolff
3. Finland – Johanna Pirttilahti
4. Germany – Alice and Ellen Kessler
5. Greece – George Amyras
6. Ireland – Pamela Flood
7. Lithuania – Lavija Šurnaitė-Kairienė
8. Netherlands – Marcus van Teijlingen
9. Poland – Ewelina Kopic
10. Portugal – Marta Leite de Castro
11. Russia – Like Kremer
12. Spain – Jesús Álvarez Cervantes
13. Sweden – Ulrica Bengtsson
14. Switzerland – Cécile Bähler
15. Ukraine – Svetoslav Vlokh
16. United Kingdom – Kirsty Gallacher

== Broadcasts ==
Most broadcaters sent commentators to London or commentated from their own country, in order to add insight to the participants and, if necessary, provide voting information. In addition to the participating countries, the event was also broadcast in Albania, Armenia, Belarus, Bosnia and Herzegovina, Cyprus, Iceland, Israel, and Macedonia.

Broadcasters and commentators in participating countries
Country	Channel(s)	Commentator(s)	Ref(s)
Austria	ORF 1	Andi Knoll and Nicole Burns-Hansen	
Denmark	DR1	Sisse Fisker and Claus Larsen	
Finland	Yle TV2	Sirpa Suutari-Jääskö and Jaana Pelkonen	
Germany	Das Erste	Peter Urban and Markus Sonyi	
Greece	NET, ERT World (delayed)	Maria Kozakou and Iordanis Pavlidis	
Ireland	RTÉ One	Marty Whelan and Michelle Alonzi	
Lithuania	LRT1	Beata Nicholson and Virginijus Visockas	
Netherlands	Nederland 1	Lucille Werner and Cor van de Stroet	
Poland	TVP2	Artur Orzech and Zbigniew St. Zasada	
Portugal	RTP1, RTP Internacional, RTP África	Isabel Angelino, Alberto Rodrigues and Marco de Camillis	
Russia	Russia-1, RTR-Planeta	Anastasia Zavorotnyuk and Stanislav Popov	
Spain	TVE1, TVE Internacional	Beatriz Pécker and Joana Subirana	
Sweden	TV4	David Hellenius and Tony Irving	
Switzerland	SF 1	German: Sascha Ruefer and Cécile Bähler	
Switzerland	TSI 1	Italian: Sandy Altermatt and Ruggero Sindico	
Ukraine	Pershyi Natsionalnyi	Timur Miroshnychenko and Oleksandra Myshko	
United Kingdom	BBC One	Len Goodman and Bruno Tonioli	

Broadcasters and commentators in non-participating countries
Country	Channel(s)	Commentator(s)	Ref(s)
Albania	RTSH	Leon Menkshi	
Armenia	ARMTV	Felix Khacatryan and Hrachuhi Utmazyan	
Belarus	BTRC	Dmitry Karas and Vladimir Parakhnevich	
Bosnia and Herzegovina	BHT 1	Dejan Kukrić	
Cyprus	CyBC 1	Melina Karageorgiou	
Iceland	RÚV (40 minutes delay)	Eva Maria Jonsdottir	
Israel	Channel 1	No commentary	
Macedonia	MKRTV	Milanka Rašić	

=== Viewing figures ===
Estimated viewership by country (in millions)
Country	Viewership	Ref(s)
Austria	0.68	
Denmark	0.51	
Finland	0.38	
Germany	3.1	
Ireland	0.36	
Israel	0.08	
Lithuania	~0.65	
Netherlands	0.76	
Poland	4	
Portugal	1.4	
Russia	~2.4	
Spain	2.2	
Sweden	1.4	
Switzerland	0.35 (SRF 1)	
Switzerland	~0.02 (TSI 1)	
Ukraine	~0.3	
United Kingdom	3.8	
Total	~23	

== See also ==
- Eurovision Song Contest 2007
- Junior Eurovision Song Contest 2007
