= Aerobic gymnastics at the 2001 World Games =

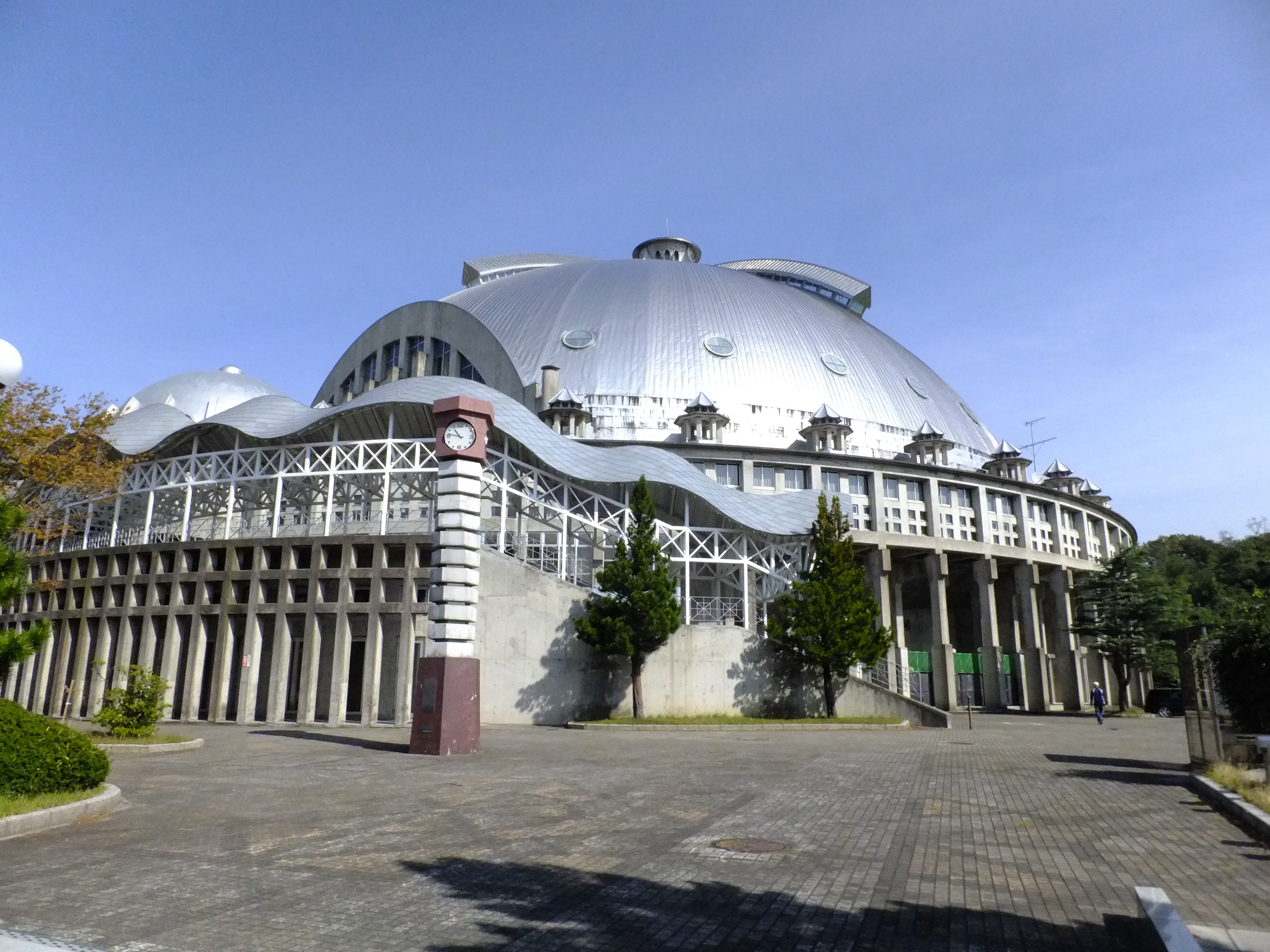
- Akita City Gymnasium
- Venue: Akita City Gymnasium
- Dates: 17–18 August 2001
- Competitors: 46 from 13 nations

The aerobic gymnastics tournaments at the 2001 World Games in Akita was played between 17 and 18 August. 46 acrobatic gymnastics competitors, from 13 nations, participated in the tournament. The aerobic gymnastics competition took place at Akita City Gymnasium.

== Participating nations ==
- Australia (1)
- Bulgaria (4)
- Chile (5)
- France (5)
- Germany (1)
- Iceland (1)
- Italy (1)
- Japan (7)
- New Zealand (3)
- Romania (4)
- Russia (5)
- South Korea (5)
- Spain (4)

== Medal table ==
Rank	Nation	Gold	Silver	Bronze	Total
1	France	1	1	1	3
2	Romania	1	1	0	2
3	Russia	1	0	0	1
3	Spain	1	0	0	1
5	Bulgaria	0	1	2	3
6	South Korea	0	1	0	1
7	Italy	0	0	1	1
Totals (7 entries)		4	4	4	12

== Events ==
Event	Gold	Silver	Bronze
Men's individual	Jonatan Cañada; Spain	Park Kwang-soo; South Korea	Grégory Alcan; France
Women's individual	Izabela Lăcătuș; Romania	Ludmila Kovatcheva; Bulgaria	Giovanna Lecis; Italy
Mixed pair	Russia; Vladislav Oksner; Tatiana Soloviova	France; Stéphane Brecard; Rachel Muller	Bulgaria; Marian Kolev; Galina Lazarova
Trio	France; Grégory Alcan; Xavier Julien; Olivier Salvan	Romania; Remus Nicolai; Claudiu Varlam; Cristian Moldovan	Bulgaria; Ludmila Kovatcheva; Galina Lazarova; Krassimira Dotzeva
