= CNA Arena Akita =

Arena in Akita, Japan

Akita Municipal Gymnasium CNA Arena Akita
- CNA Arena
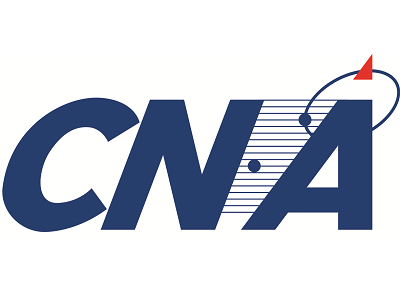

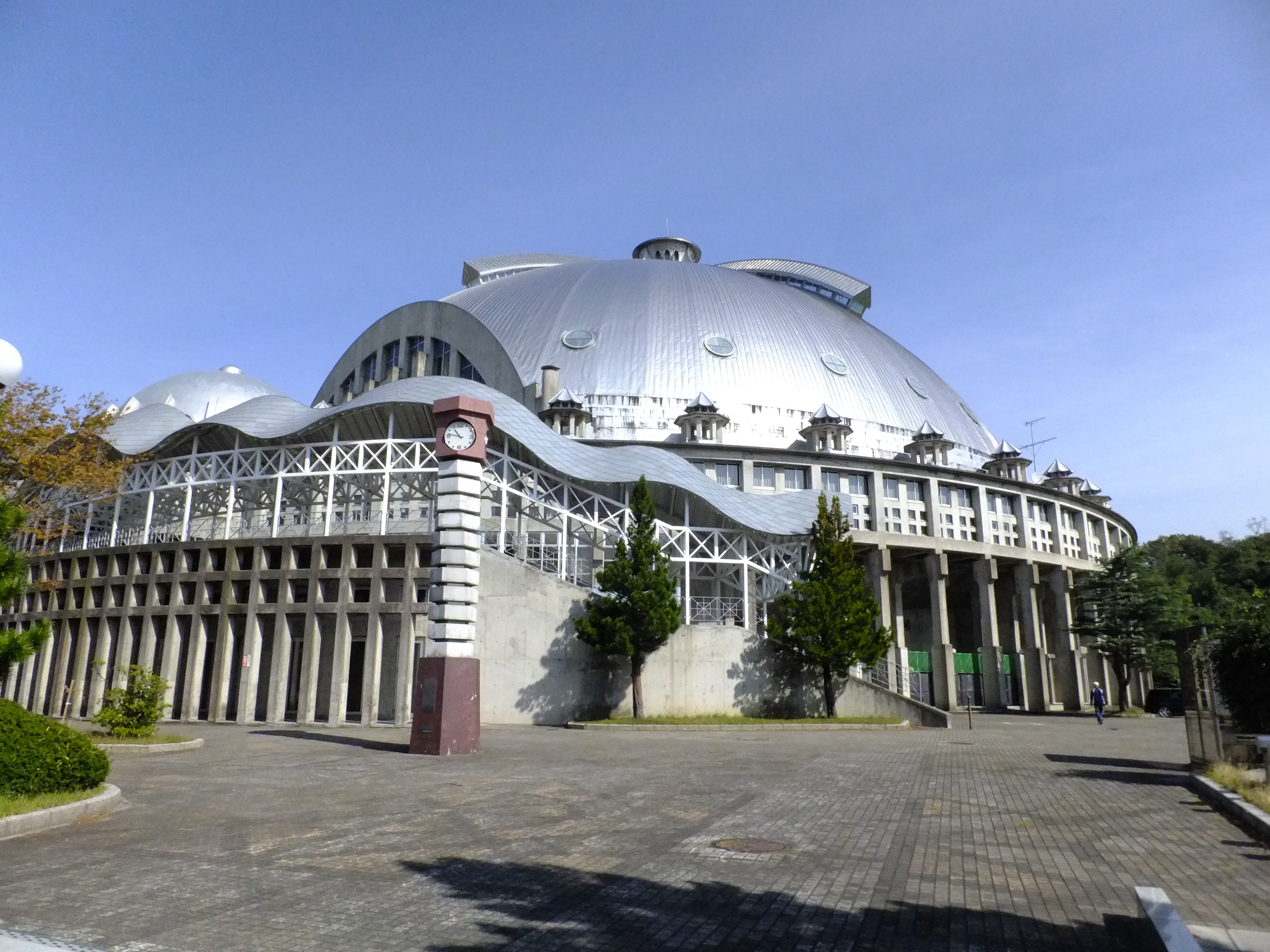

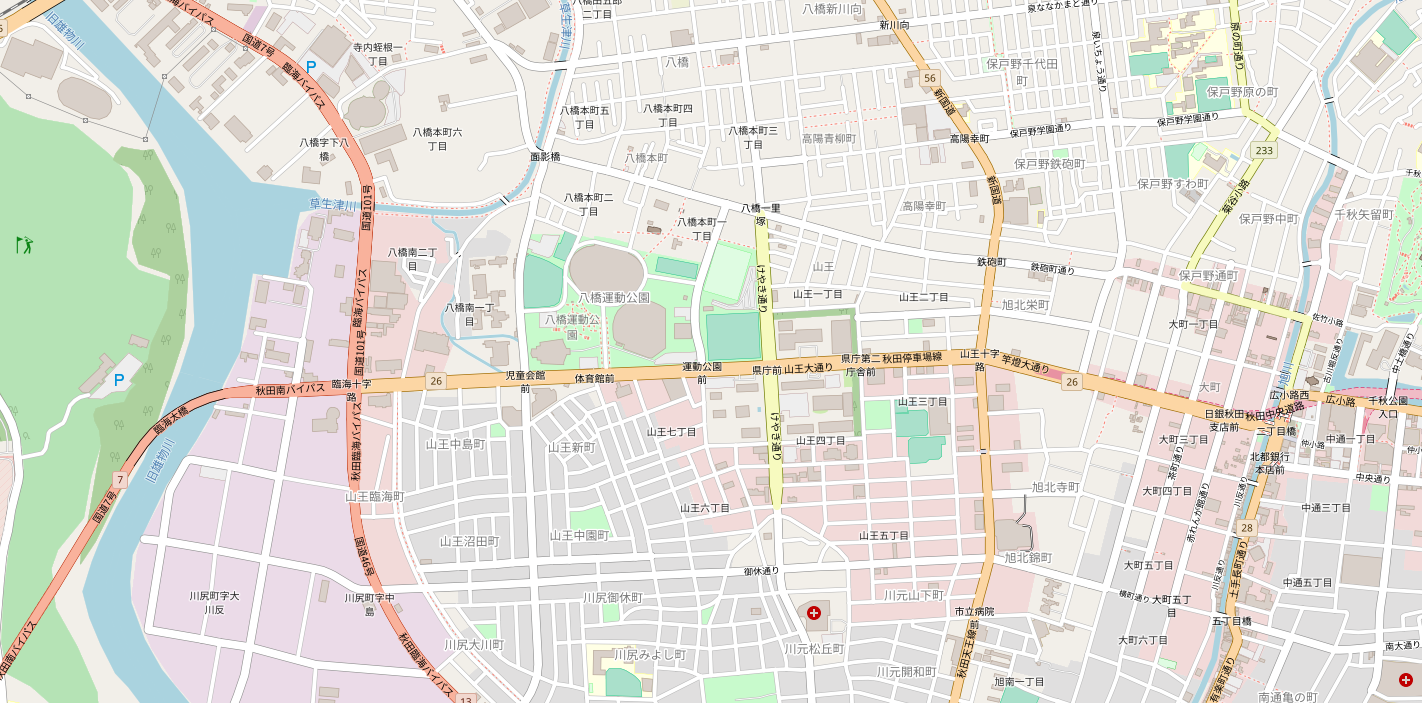
- Location within Akita, Akita Location within Akita Prefecture Location within Japan
- Interactive map of Akita Municipal Gymnasium; CNA Arena Akita
- Location: Akita, Japan
- Owner: Akita city
- Operator: Akita city
- Capacity: 5,000: basketball
- Surface: Birch flooring
- Field size: 24,276.88 m^{2}
- Parking: 382

Construction
- Opened: April, 1994
- Cost: JPY3.8 billion
- Architect: Toyokazu Watanabe
- Structural engineer: Kawasaki Architect Structural Engineers
- Main contractor: Konoike Construction

Tenants
- Akita Northern Happinets (2016-present); Yonex Akita Masters (2018-present)

The Akita Municipal Gymnasium (秋田市立体育館, Akita Shiritsu Taiikukan), currently known as CNA Arena Akita (CNAアリーナ★あきた) for sponsorship reasons, is an arena in Rinkai-area, Akita, Japan. It is owned and run by the city.

Cable Networks Akita (CNA) acquired its naming rights in 2015. The silver-colored building opened in 1994 and holds 5,000 people. The gym has a dome-shaped 154 feet height ceiling, and added 2,088 extra seatings in 2016. It is the home arena of the Akita Northern Happinets of the B.League, Japan's professional basketball league. The biggest basketball court in Akita is Akita Prefectural Gymnasium.

== Facilities ==
- Main arena - 2,540m^{2} （63.5m×40m）
- Sub arena - 863m^{2} （38.0m×22m）
- Table tennis room - 324m^{2}
- Multi-purpose hall - 324m^{2}
- Running course - 810m^{2}

== Sports Events ==
CNA Arena has hosted the following sports events:

- 2001 World Games - Acrobatic gymnastics, Aerobic gymnastics, Rhythmic gymnastics, Dancesport, Trampoline gymnanastics
- National Sports Festival of Japan - Gymnastics (2007)
- bj League All-Star Game (2014)
- Akita Masters

=== Sports events at former municipal gymnasium in Sannoh ===
- All-Japan Artistic Gymnastics Championships 20–23 November 1964, Akita City-born Yukio Endō won gold medals in individual all-around, silver medals in floor exercise, rings, vault, horizontal bar and bronze medal in parallel bars

== Gallery ==
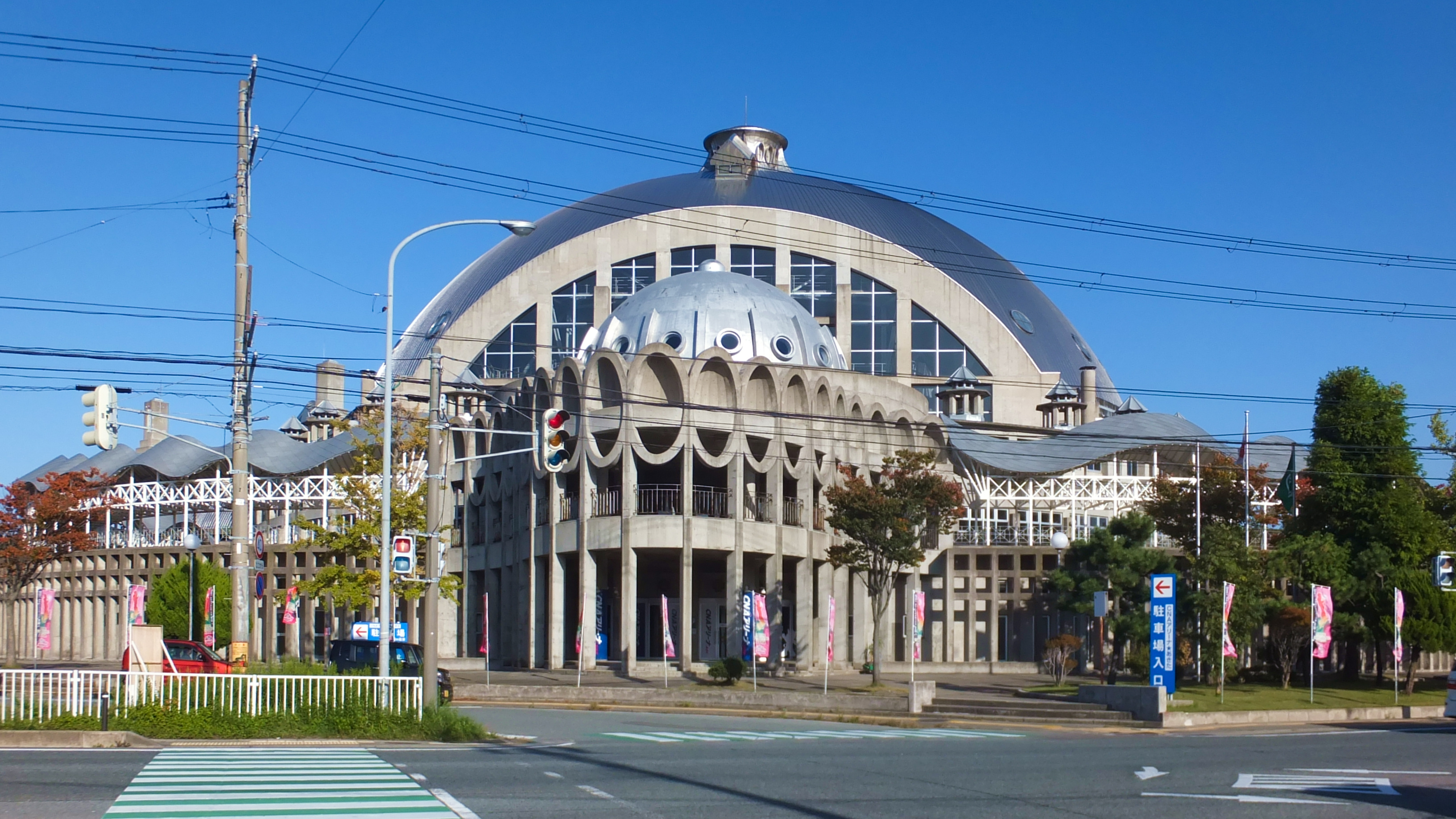
View from Rinkai road

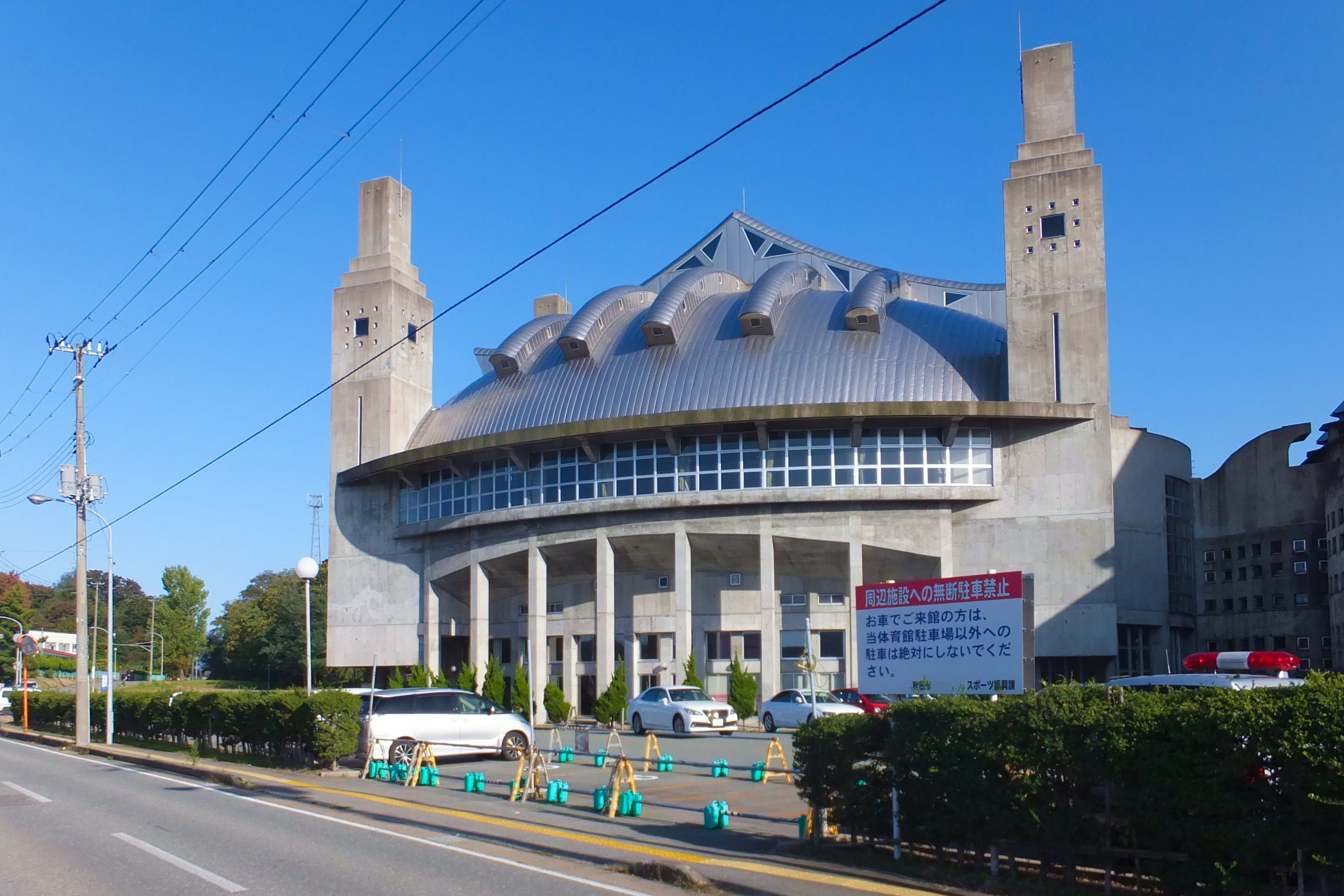
Sub Arena

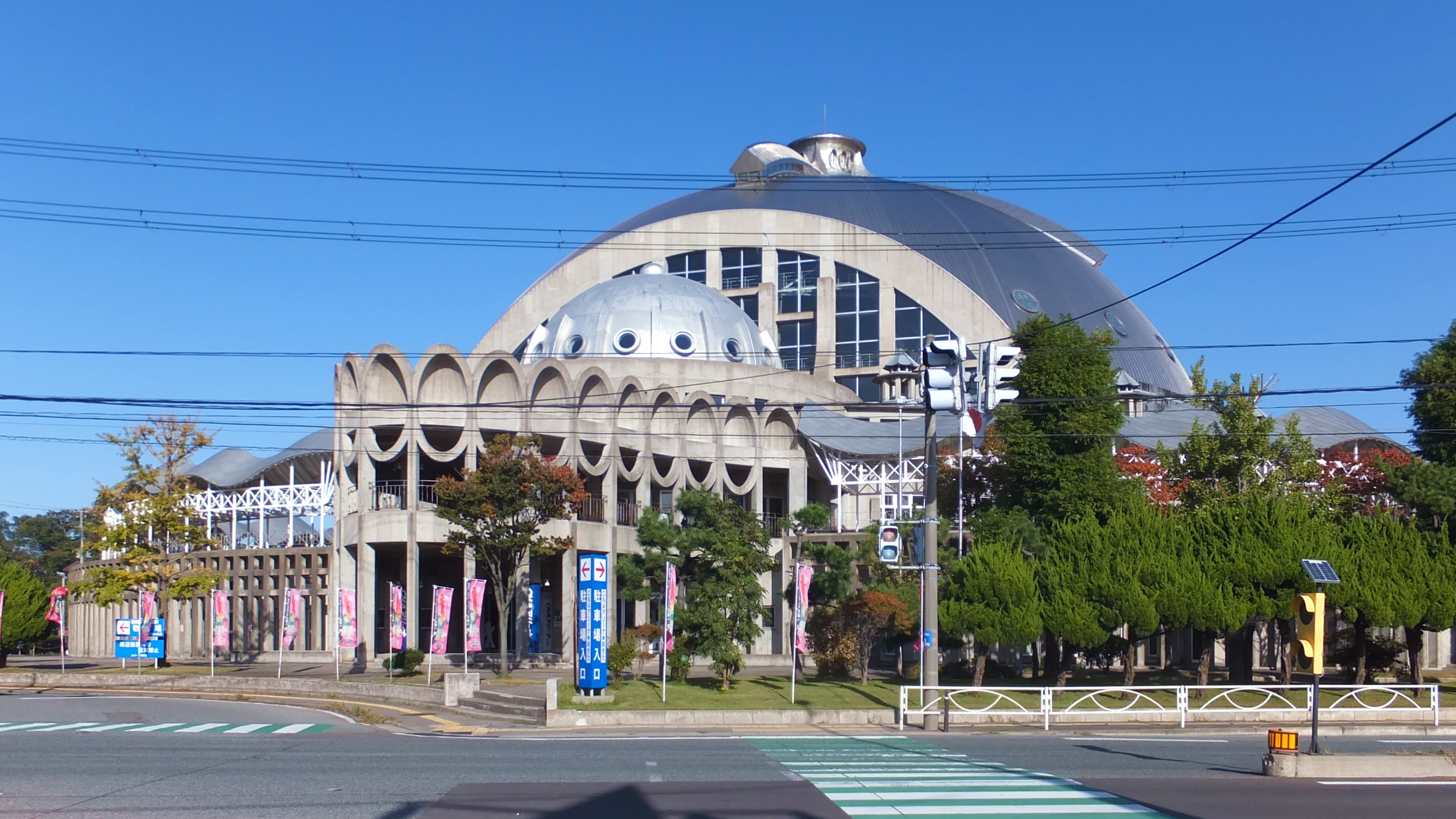

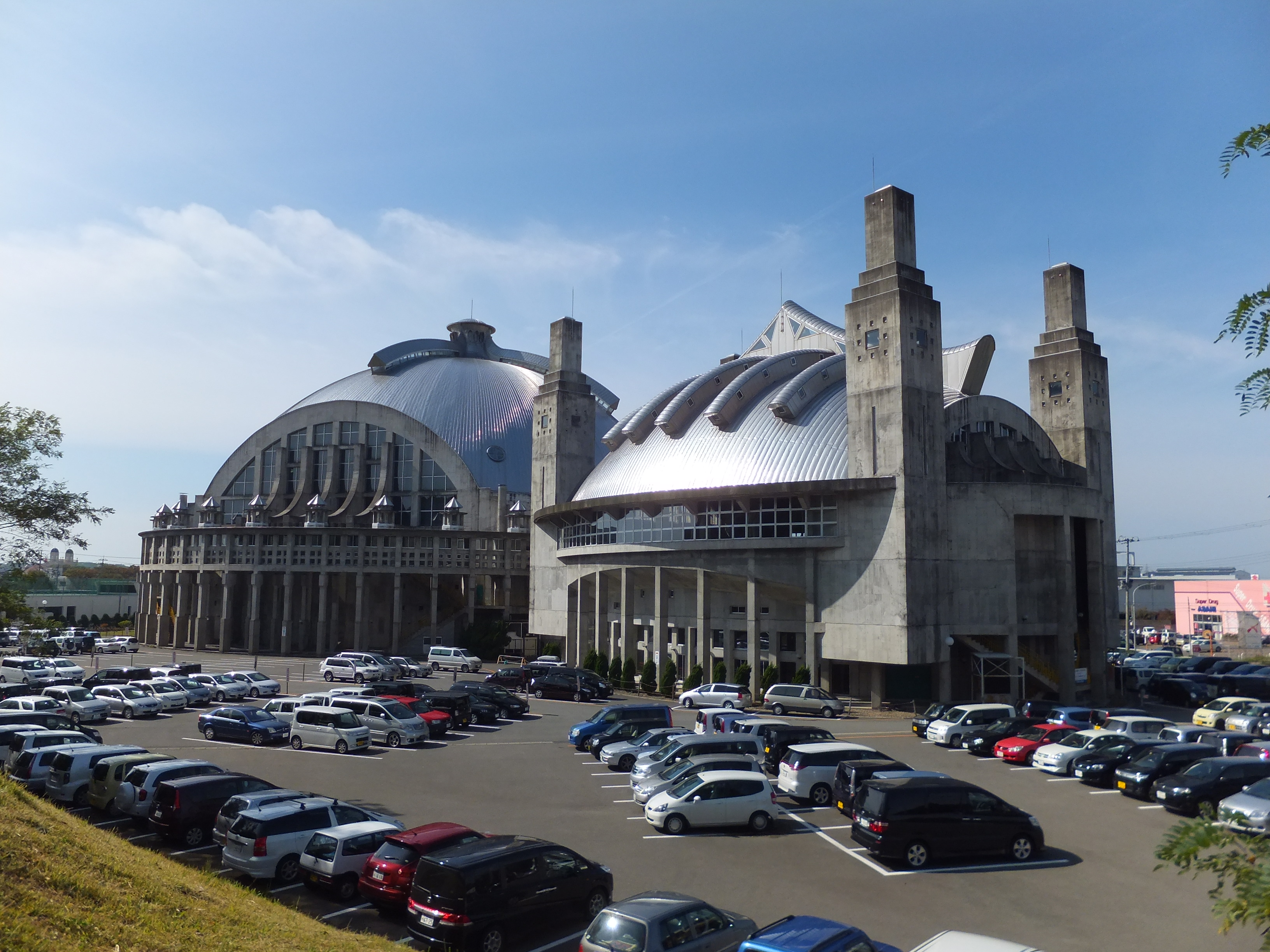
The Happinets Powerhouse

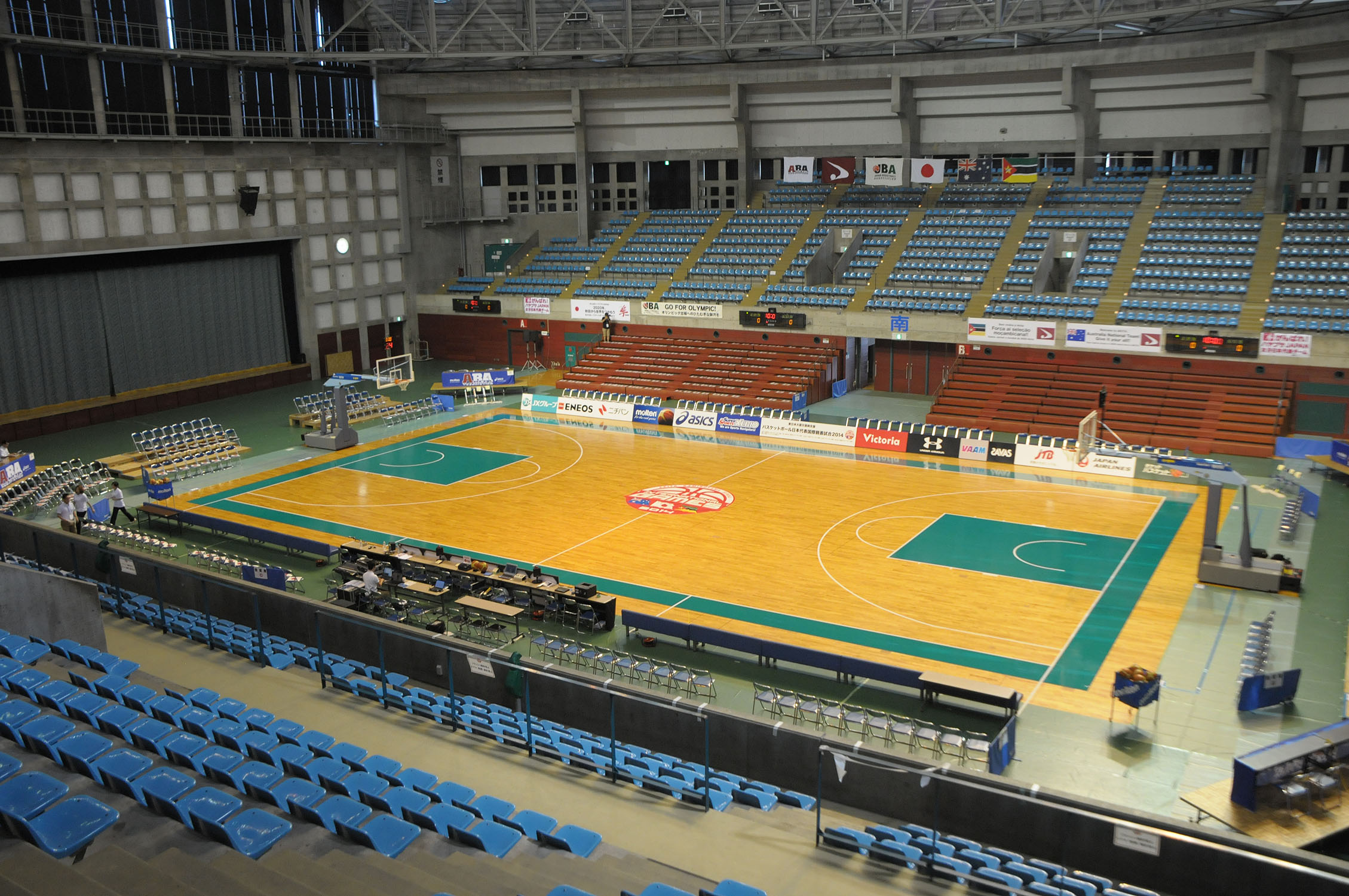
Main Arena

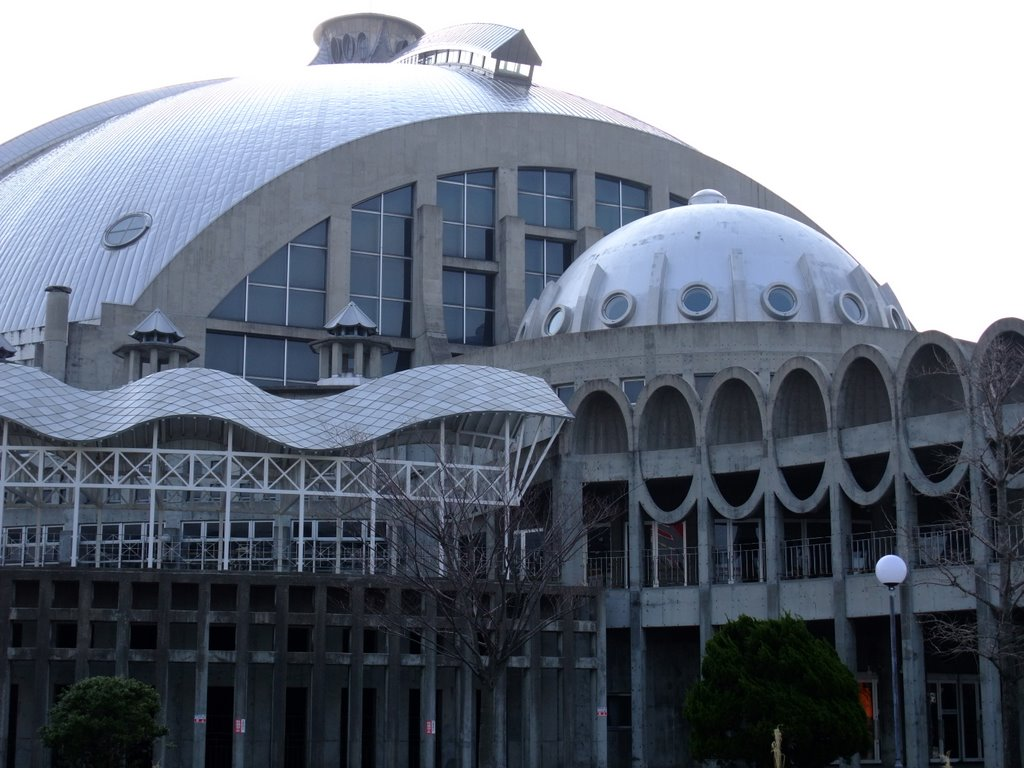
Panoramio photo

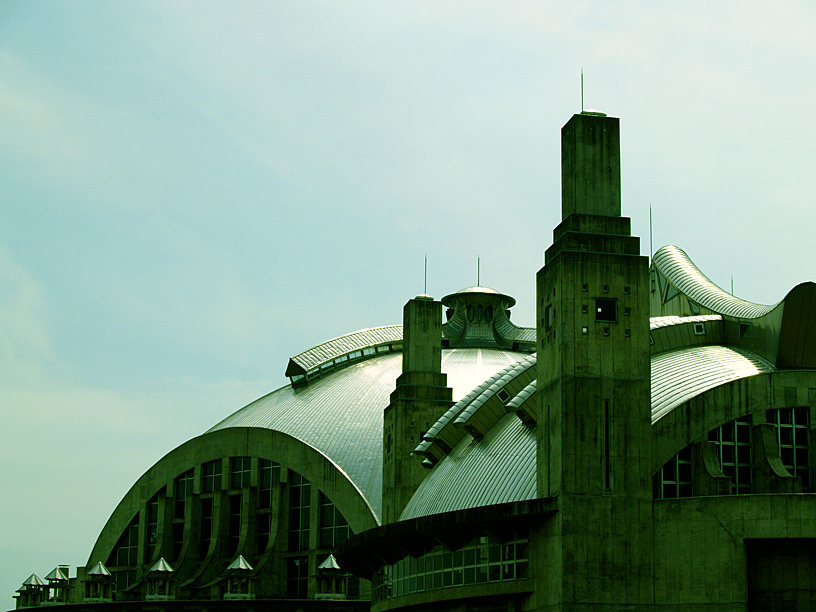

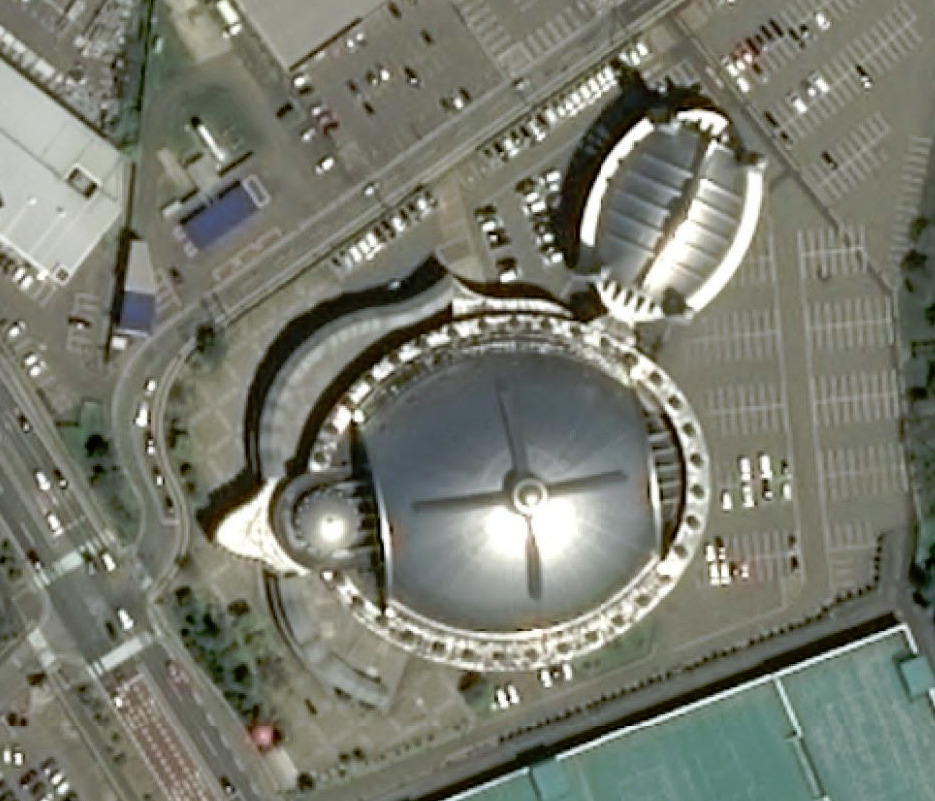
Satellite view

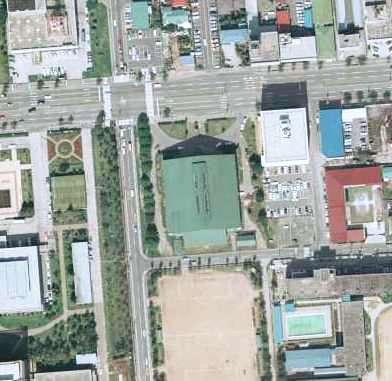
Aerial view of former Akita Municipal Gymnasium in 1975 (39°43′7.9″N 140°06′17.1″E)

== Drops of water ==
On January 9. 2018, it leaked on the court floor, and the basketball game was delayed. Other roof leaks are also reported.

== Attendance records ==
The record for a basketball game is 4,951, set on November 30, 2022, when the Happinets defeated the Alvark Tokyo 83-69.

== Access ==
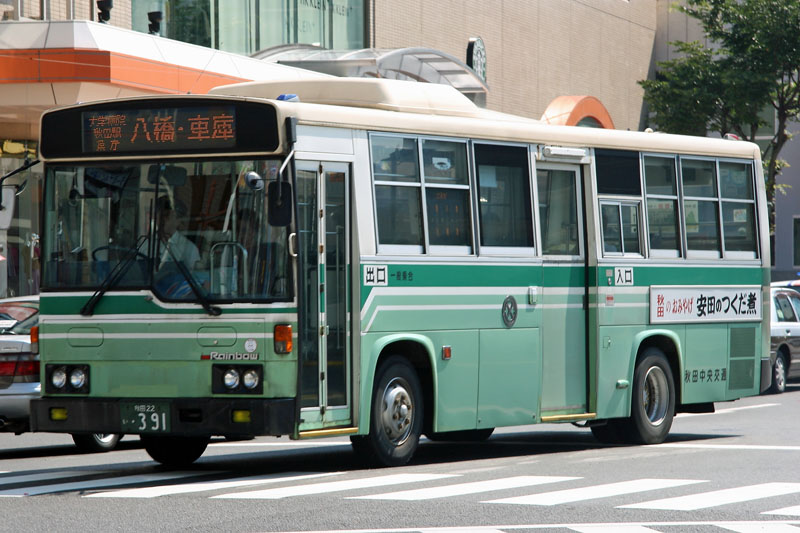
Chuo Kotsu bus

- From Akita Station: Akita Chūō Kōtsū for Rinkai Eigyosho, Kenritsu Pool. Get off at Shiritsu Taiikukan-mae.

== Location map ==
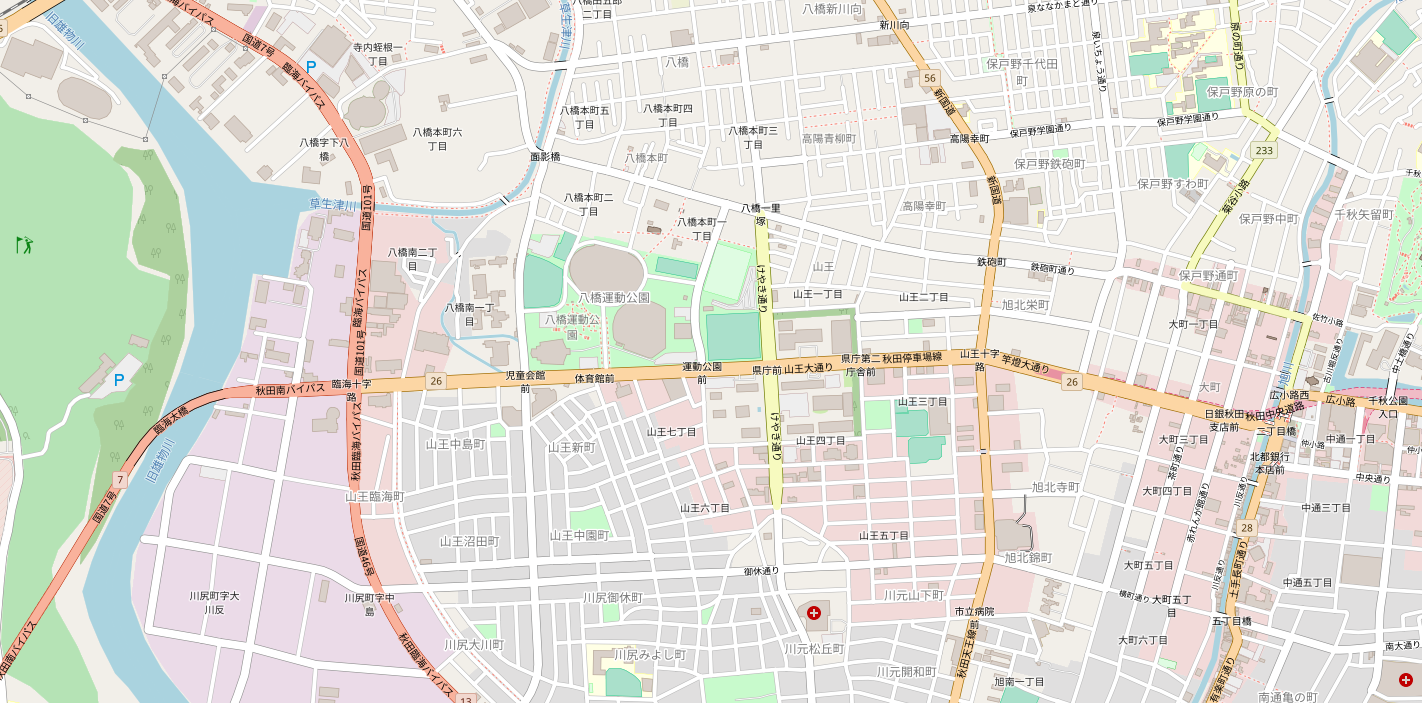
CNA Arena Akita (Akita, Akita)
