= Eurovision Dance Contest =

Former annual dance competition organised by Eurovision

- Genre: Dance competition
- Created by: Richard Bunn
- Based on: Eurovision Song Contest
- Presented by: Graham Norton; Claudia Winkleman
- Country of origin: United Kingdom
- Original languages: English; French
- No. of episodes: 2 contests

Production
- Production locations: London and Glasgow, United Kingdom
- Running time: 2 hours (2007); 2 hours, 15 minutes (2008)
- Production companies: European Broadcasting Union; Splash Media; Sunset + Vine

Original release
- Release: 1 September 2007 – 6 September 2008

The Eurovision Dance Contest was an international ballroom dancing competition organised by the European Broadcasting Union (EBU) and the International DanceSport Federation (IDSF). The IDSF credits the existence of the contest to Richard Bunn of Geneva-based consulting firm RBI Network, and former EBU controller of sport, who convinced the EBU to create the programme.

== Format ==
The competition consisted of pairs of dancers from each participating country, each pair performing one dance, a freestyle dance in which the cultures of the individual countries could be showcased to the rest of Europe. The routines were judged by European audiences who cast their vote for their favourite couple via telephone or text messaging to determine winner of the competition and, for the second edition, were also evaluated by a panel of dance experts. Some participating broadcasters held national selections to choose its representative for the contest. The BBC was "host broadcaster" for the only two contests to date, in 2007 and 2008.

== Contest history ==
=== 2007 ===
Eurovision Dance Contest 2007 was hosted in London, United Kingdom. In EDC 2007 each couple has performed two 1 minute 30 seconds dances: the first dance was a ballroom or Latin dance while the second was a freestyle dance. Professional dance couples were allowed to enter the competition. Finland won the competition.

=== 2008 ===
Several changes were introduced for Eurovision Dance Contest 2008 which was hosted in Glasgow, United Kingdom. Professional dance couples were no longer allowed, all pairs had to include one professional and one celebrity dancer. Only one, 2 minute dance, was performed by each couple. A professional jury was introduced to the competition having approximate weight of 20% of the outcome, while the remaining 80% came from televoting. Poland won the competition.

=== Cancellation ===
The cancelled third Eurovision Dance Contest was originally planned to be organised in Baku, Azerbaijan at the Heydar Aliyev Sports and Exhibition Complex on 26 September 2009. Host broadcaster İctimai Television was planning to increase the number of participating countries as well as inviting a world-famous star to host the contest, listing Jennifer Lopez, Kylie Minogue and Shakira as candidates. An additional extravaganza open-air concert was planned to be held, bringing together ex-participants of the Eurovision, Junior Eurovision and Eurovision Dance contests on one stage.

On 28 May 2009, the EBU announced that the contest was postponed at least until autumn 2010 as "the number of broadcasters that signed up for participation had not reach the desired level". According to a preliminary calculations, at least five countries that were taking part in Eurovision Dance Contest 2008, namely Austria, Finland, Lithuania, Netherlands and Sweden had announced withdrawal from the contest, with only Belarus confirming its participation as a début country. According to contest coordinator on behalf of EBU Tal Barnea, "concrete plans for a 2010 autumn event were being developed, with considerable changes to introduce a new programme proposal". These plans were expected to be unveiled in the autumn of 2009. The EBU also praised "the commendable work on the next Eurovision Dance Contest already completed by our partners Ictimai Television and the Azerbaijani officials" stating that 2010 edition of the contest was planned to take place in Baku, Azerbaijan as well. In January 2010, EBU Eurovision coordinator, Svante Stockselius, announced that contest had been postponed again, and is now unlikely to happen at all, at least within the next couple of years. He explained this decision was because the popularity of televised dance shows had calmed down recently. In October 2020, it was revealed that Polish broadcaster TVP submitted an unsuccessful bid to host the third edition of the contest at their headquarters in Warsaw.

== Participation ==
Countries that participated in the contest: Entered at least once Never entered, although was eligible to do so Entry intended or initially expressed

When the competition was first planned, the aim was to begin with ten to twelve participating countries and expand in subsequent years. However, the response rate was greater than anticipated and it proved difficult to turn away the additional countries interested in participating in the event. For logistical reasons, a limitation on number of participants was established. In order to ensure the event was a success, the EBU invited participating broadcasters from member countries to take part. In several countries, where the EBU had more than one member, two broadcasters expressed interest. The final decision of which broadcaster would represent those countries was decided by either an internal accord by the two broadcasters, or by a draw, conducted by the EBU.

Sixteen countries; Austria, Denmark, Finland, Germany, Greece, Ireland, Lithuania, the Netherlands, Poland, Portugal, Russia, Spain, Sweden, Switzerland, Ukraine and the host country the United Kingdom all débuted in the very first Eurovision Dance Contest in 2007. The Croatian broadcaster HRT had expressed an interest in taking part, but did not appear on the final list of participants. In June 2008, Switzerland announced their withdrawal from the 2008 contest without specifying a reason, while Germany withdrew from the 2008 event the same month, due to comparatively low ratings for the 2007 contest in the country. Spain was originally due to take part in 2008, but withdrew in late August 2008 just days before the event, reportedly due to a scheduling clash with the country competing in a qualifying match for the 2010 FIFA World Cup, which was taking place the same evening. In accordance with the rules, Spanish broadcaster TVE were obliged to broadcast the contest live due to their late withdrawal as an active participant. After Switzerland announced their non-participation, and with the format change meaning each couple would dance one one minute and forty five seconds dance each, new countries became eligible to join the event. Azerbaijan were the only country to join that year, but negotiations had taken place with broadcasters from Belarus and Cyprus.

Belarus intended on competing for the first time in 2009 but the contest was cancelled. Although the 2009 contest never happened, Austria, Finland, Lithuania, Sweden and the Netherlands had confirmed they would not compete in the third contest.

Year	Country making its debut entry	Broadcaster(s)
2007	Austria	ORF
2007	Denmark	DR
2007	Finland	Yle
2007	Germany	WDR (ARD)
2007	Greece	ERT
2007	Ireland	RTÉ
2007	Lithuania	LRT
2007	Netherlands	TROS (NPO)
2007	Poland	TVP
2007	Portugal	RTP
2007	Russia	RTR (2007); C1R (2008)
2007	Spain	TVE
2007	Sweden	TV4
2007	Switzerland	SRG SSR
2007	Ukraine	NTU
2007	United Kingdom	BBC
2008	Azerbaijan	İTV

== Hosting ==
Most of the expense of the contest is covered by commercial sponsors and contributions from the other participating nations. The contest is considered to be a unique opportunity for promoting the host country as a tourist destination. The table below shows a list of cities and venues that have hosted Eurovision Dance Contest, one or more times.

Contests	Country	City	Venue	Years
2	United Kingdom	London	BBC Television Centre	2007
2	United Kingdom	Glasgow	Scottish Exhibition and Conference Centre	2008

== Winners ==
Map showing each country's number of wins

The contest differs from the Eurovision Song Contest in that the winning country does not automatically become host for the next contest. The Eurovision Dance Contest followed the same host selection process as the Junior Eurovision Song Contest.

Year	Date	Host city	No.	Winner	Dancers	Dance style	Points	Margin
2007	1 September	(United Kingdom) London	16	Finland	Katja Koukkula and Jussi Väänänen	Rumba and Paso Doble	132	11
2008	6 September	(United Kingdom) Glasgow	14	Poland	Edyta Herbuś and Marcin Mroczek	Rumba, Cha-cha-cha and Jazz Dance	154	33

=== Top three placings ===
Country	1st place, gold medalist(s)	2nd place, silver medalist(s)	3rd place, bronze medalist(s)	Total	Years won
Finland	1	0	0	1	2007
Poland	1	0	0	1	2008
Ukraine	0	1	1	2	
Russia	0	1	0	1	
Ireland	0	0	1	1	
