= Matthew Rooke =

Matthew Rooke is a musician, composer and performer who also works in producing and directing theatre work. Born in England, he is of Scottish and Gabonese descent. His work spans an eclectic and diverse range of forms and creative partners, spanning the worlds of opera, classical music and contemporary jazz, rock and traditional music. His musical partners and collaborations range from Sir John Tavener, Billy Childish, Nitin Sawhney, Ric Sanders, Fred Thelonious Baker, The James Taylor Quartet and The National Youth Orchestra of Scotland.

In the theatre he has created scores for Theatre Royal Stratford East, Talawa, The Leicester Haymarket and the Royal National Theatre. He has worked as musical director and arranger for directors and authors such as Yvonne Brewster, Tim Supple, Mark Bramble, John Dexter, Philip Hedley, Tim Flavin, Barrie Keeffe and Henry Krieger and with actors such as Paul Barber, Helen McCrory, Miriam Karlin, Donna Croll, Mona Hammond, Gary Shail, Mark McGann, David Harewood, Cathy Tyson, and Bonnie Langford.

== Biography ==
Matthew Rooke's path through music followed two parallel worlds. In classical music, Matthew began as a double-bassist, working up through regional and County Youth Orchestras in Kent. At the same time he began playing electric bass and guitar in rock and jazz bands. At the age of 17 he won a Cleo Laine Award which enabled him to study contemporary jazz with many of the leading practitioners on the scene. As a freelance player and composer, the next few years established a pattern which saw Matthew spanning musical worlds which would appear to have very little in common - one moment backing Jake Thackray, the next acting as amanuensis for Wild Billy Childish, then a concert of Stravinsky and Bartok at the Royal Festival Hall. After completing an MA at St Andrews in 1986, Matthew Rooke was a Robert T Jones graduate fellow at Berklee College of Music in Boston, where he also won the Abe Laboriel Bass Scholarship and a Professional Music Award, and was taught arranging and orchestration by Richard Evans (who started his career as a bass-player for Lionel Hampton and arranged for artists such as Natalie Cole, Minnie Ripperton and Tower of Power).

On returning to the UK, Matthew worked extensively as a session player and orchestrator/composer, before being invited to join the Arts Council as lead officer for establishing the African and Caribbean and Asian music circuits and as producer of the Arts Council recordings programme, managing the Arts Council's investment in recordings by composers of the stature of Nicholas Maw, Anthony Payne and Sir John Tavener, notably The Protecting Veil.

This was followed by a period as music director of the Scottish Arts Council, during which time he made support for Scottish traditional music, jazz and other diverse music forms an equal priority for the council and meanwhile he continued to work in Theatre in England. On leaving the Scottish Arts Council his first assignment was as a featured soloist for Sir John Tavener in the premiere recording of Depart in Peace ('An exceedingly beautiful disc that I have no hesitation in making my record of the year' - Gramophone). Following a period as Co -Director of Scottish Cultural Enterprise, Matthew returned to music as his sole focus on his appointment as the first-ever music fellow at Perth Concert Hall, via Horsecross Arts during 2010 and 2011 where he began work on Flyting, an hour-long work exploring 500 years of Scottish and African interactions for soprano, bass-baritone, chamber orchestra and Scottish folk instruments.

== The Maltings Theatre ==
Rooke was CEO and artistic director of The Maltings Berwick Trust, an organisation which operates a collection of venues comprising a main-house and studio theatre, digital cinema and two separate galleries in Berwick-upon-Tweed from 2012 to 2020.
