= Dancesport at the 2009 World Games =

- Venue: Kaohsiung Arena
- Dates: 24–25 July 2009
- Competitors: 147 from 39 nations

The dancesport competitions at the 2009 World Games in Kaohsiung was held between 24 and 25 July. 147 dancers from 39 nations, participated in the tournament. The dancesport competition took place at Kaohsiung Arena.

== Participating nations ==
- Australia (2)
- Austria (4)
- Belarus (2)
- Bulgaria (2)
- Canada (4)
- Chinese Taipei (4)
- Croatia (4)
- Czech Republic (2)
- Estonia (2)
- Finland (4)
- France (9)
- Germany (8)
- Hong Kong (2)
- Hungary (8)
- Israel (2)
- Italy (6)
- Japan (4)
- Kazakhstan (2)
- Kyrgyzstan (4)
- Latvia (4)
- Lithuania (4)
- Malaysia (2)
- Moldova (2)
- Netherlands (2)
- Norway (2)
- Philippines (4)
- Poland (8)
- Portugal (2)
- Russia (8)
- Slovakia (2)
- Slovenia (6)
- Sweden (2)
- Switzerland (4)
- South Africa (4)
- South Korea (4)
- Spain (4)
- Thailand (2)
- Ukraine (4)
- United States (2)

== Medal table ==
Rank	Nation	Gold	Silver	Bronze	Total
1	Russia	1	1	2	4
2	Italy	1	0	1	2
3	France	1	0	0	1
4	Germany	0	1	0	1
4	Slovenia	0	1	0	1
Totals (5 entries)		3	3	3	9

== Events ==
Event	Gold	Silver	Bronze
Standard	Italy; Paolo Bosco; Silvia Pitton	Germany; Benedetto Ferruggia; Claudia Köhler	Russia; Marat Gimaev; Alina Basyuk
Latin	Russia; Alexey Silde; Anna Firstova	Slovenia; Jurij Batagelj; Jagoda Štrukelj	Italy; Gabriele Goffredo; Antonia Goffredo
Rock'n'Roll	France; Christophe Payan; Kathy Richeta	Russia; Ivan Yudin; Olga Sbitneva	Russia; Ivan Klimov; Katrin Gazazyan
