= Kylie Jones =

British dancer

Medal record

Dancesport

Representing Great Britain

World Games
Gold medal – first place	2001 Akita	Standard

Kylie Jones is a British professional ballroom dancer. She was the 2000 and 2001 World Ballroom Champion, the 2001 European Ballroom Champion, the 2000 and 2001 Open British Ballroom Champion, and the 2000 and 2001 United Kingdom Ballroom Champion.

Jones began dancing as a seven-year-old and by the age of 11 she had become the International and Open British Juvenile Ballroom champion. She became the British Junior Champion in three consecutive years at ages 13, 14 and 15.

Jones won the World Games in 2001 with her then-partner Jonathan Crossley. After winning their second World Ballroom Championship title in 2001, Jones and Crossley turned professional. They competed in a number of professional competitions between 2001 and 2002, including the British National Dance Championships, the 2002 British Open, the 2002 UK Open, the Asian Open Professional Championships, and the 2001 and 2002 Elsa Wells International Championships.

Jones took part in the first series of Strictly Come Dancing, the UK television programme which was exported to 30 other countries as Dancing with the Stars. Jones was partnered with stand-up comedian Jason Wood. They were the first to leave the competition, after being voted out in the second week of the show.

Jones retired from competition in 2002. She now teaches dancing and pilates in Surrey, having obtained a level three diploma in Pilates Technique.
