= Katja Koukkula =

Finnish dancer and dance teacher

Katja Koukkula is a Finnish dancer and dance teacher, who has won several Finnish championships with her dance partner Jussi Väänänen. On August 25, 2007, they were elected to represent Finland in the first Eurovision Dance Contest, which took place on September 1, 2007 in London. They won the competition with 132 points, performing the Rumba and Paso Doble. The couple have won seven national titles as amateurs and came 4th in the European Championships. They've also won the British Open Rising Star contest in 2000.

== History ==
Katja Koukkula married Jussi Väänänen on 2 July 2010 in Suomenlinna.

Koukkula competed on the first series of Tanssii tähtien kanssa, the Finnish version of Strictly Come Dancing, where she partnered celebrity Jone Nikula. The couple finished third in the competition.
