= Direct Line with Vladimir Putin =

Televised political event in Russia

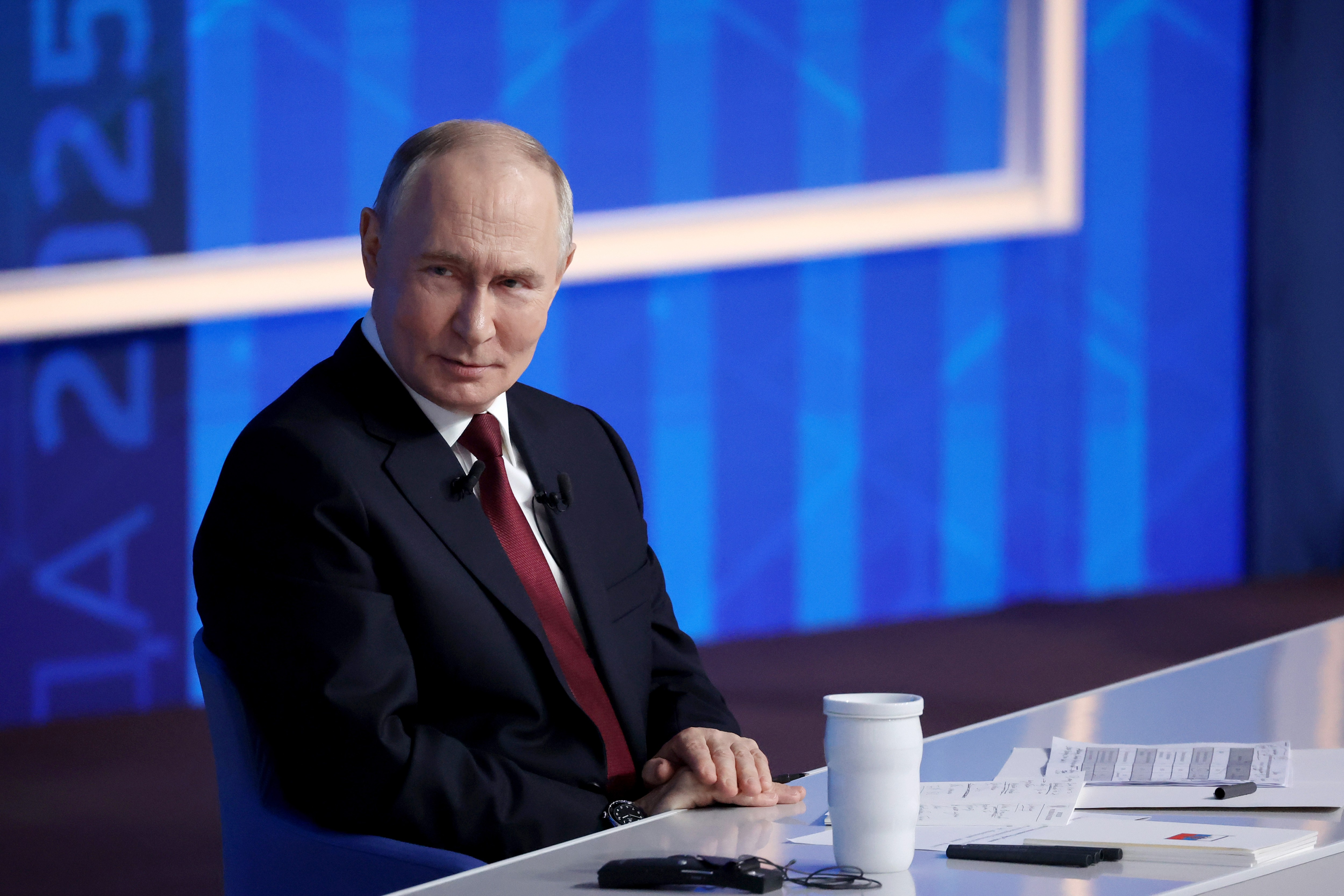
- Putin at the 2025 session
- Status: Active
- Genre: Political event
- Begins: December 24, 2001
- Frequency: Annually
- Locations: Ostankino, Moscow
- Country: Russia
- Most recent: December 19, 2025
- Participants: Vladimir Putin
- Website: http://moskva-putinu.ru

Direct Line with Vladimir Putin (Russian: Прямая линия с Владимиром Путиным, romanized: Pryamaya liniya s Vladimirom Putinym) is an annual televised political event in Russia. As its name implies, it is a question and answer event with Russian President Vladimir Putin. The event is broadcast on television by Russia-1, Russia 24, RT and Channel One, and on radio by Mayak, Vesti FM and Radio of Russia. It is supported and directed by the Kremlin Press Secretary.

During Putin's premiership, the event was called Talk with Vladimir Putin: The Continuation (Russian: Разговор с Владимиром Путиным. Продолжение, romanized: Razgovor s Vladimirom Putinym. Prodolzheniye).

A similar programme existed during the presidency of Dmitry Medvedev, titled Talk with Dmitry Medvedev (Разговор с Дмитрием Медведевым).

== Format ==
Over the course of the event, Putin answers questions from Russian citizens about politics, policy, and current events, asked over telephone, texts, email, and video calls. Through the programme, Putin presents himself as able to address the concerns of Russians himself, without the assistance of other government agencies and assemblies.
