= Jussi Väänänen =

Finnish dancer

Jussi Väänänen is a competitive dancer who won the Eurovision Dance Contest 2007 with his partner Katja Koukkula.

== Career ==
Jussi and Katja started their professional career in 2000 and they are Finnish champions in competitive dance. They got 132 points in Eurovision Dance Contest by dancing the Rumba and Paso Doble. They've also won the British Open Rising Star contest in 2000.

Jussi has also been the professional dancer in the Finnish version of Dancing with the Stars with his partner Katja Kannonlahti. Nowadays he has quit his career and he focuses on teaching and theatre.
