= Edita Daniūtė =

Lithuanian dancer

Personal information
- Born: 1 July 1979 (age 46) Vilnius, Lithuania
- Spouse: Mirko Gozzoli (m. 2019)
Medal record
Dance sport
Representing Lithuania
World Games
Gold medal – first place	2005 Duisburg	Standard
Bronze medal – third place	2001 Akita	Standard
World Championships
Gold medal – first place	2013 Bassano del Grappa	Standard
Gold medal – first place	2014 Nanjing	Standard
Silver medal – second place	2004 Vilnius	Standard
Bronze medal – third place	1996 Paris	Standard
Bronze medal – third place	2003 Vienna	Standard
Bronze medal – third place	2005 Krefeld	Standard
European Championships
Gold medal – first place	2007 Madrid	Standard
Gold medal – first place	2013 Leipzig	Standard
Silver medal – second place	2004 Ljubljana	Standard
Silver medal – second place	2005 St. Peteresbourg	Standard
Silver medal – second place	2006 Calvia	Standard

Edita Daniūtė (born 1 July 1979 in Vilnius), also known as Edita Gozzoli, is a professional Lithuanian ballroom dancer and television presenter.

Until 2007 she was competing with her partner Arūnas Bižokas as a couple; they won the World Games in 2005. In 2007 Bižokas transferred to the IOC non-recognized WDC and started representing the USA. Daniūtė started competing with Italian dancer Mirko Gozzoli in November 2009 under the Lithuanian flag. As a couple they become World and European champions in 2013 & 2014. They were married on June 15, 2019. Edita Daniūtė was television presenter in the dance show "Šok su žvaigždė" that aired on LNK.
