= Arūnas Bižokas =

Lithuanian dancer

Medal record

Dance sport

Representing Lithuania

World Games
Gold medal – first place	2005 Duisburg	Standard
Bronze medal – third place	2001 Akita	Standard

World Championships
Silver medal – second place	2004 Vilnius	Standard
Bronze medal – third place	1996 Paris	Standard
Bronze medal – third place	2003 Vienna	Standard
Bronze medal – third place	2005 Krefeld	Standard

European Championships
Gold medal – first place	2007 Madrid	Standard
Silver medal – second place	2004 Ljubljana	Standard
Silver medal – second place	2005 St. Peteresbourg	Standard
Silver medal – second place	2006 Calvia	Standard

Arūnas Bižokas (born 29 January 1978 in Vilnius, Lithuania) is a professional Lithuanian ballroom dancer, who is represented the United States.

Until 2007 he was competing with his partner Edita Daniūtė under the Lithuanian flag at World DanceSport Federation recognized events, which is recognized as competitive dancing representing federation by the International Olympic Committee. In 2005 the couple won the World Games.

After 2007 Bižokas started to compete in the alternative World Dance Council rules events under the United States flag. His current partner is Katusha Demidova. As a couple they have won the 2009, 2010, 2011, 2012, 2013, 2014, 2015, 2016, 2017, 2018 and 2019 Professional World Ballroom Dance Championships in Standard Ballroom. In 2013, Bižokas and his partner were ranked number one in the World Dance Council world ranking in the Professional Ballroom category.

Arunas and Katusha retired from competitive dancing in 2019.
