= List of compositions by Isaac Albéniz =

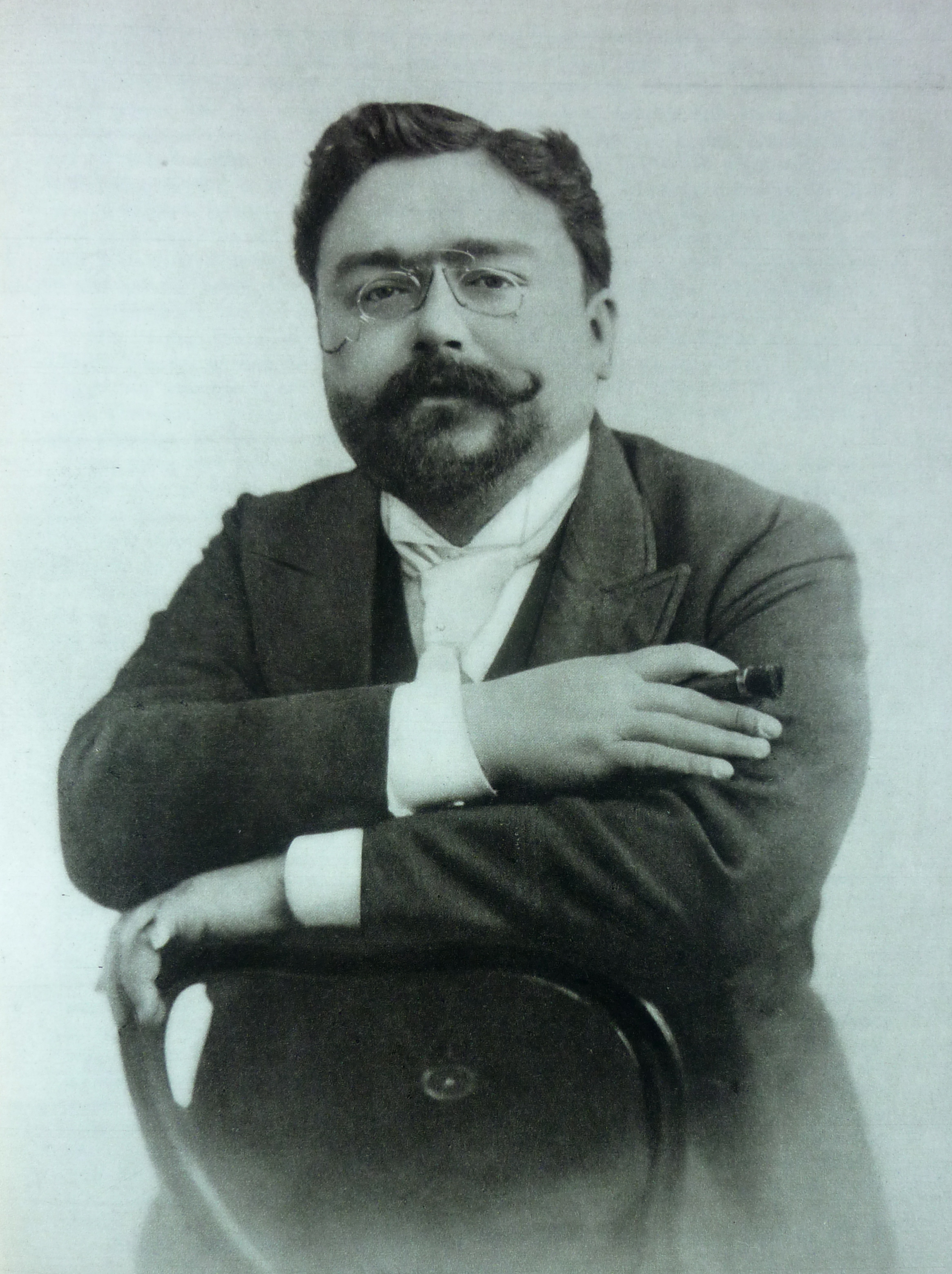
Isaac Albéniz, 1901

This is a list of compositions by Isaac Albéniz (1860–1909).

Albéniz was a prolific composer who composed a vast number of works across a variety of different genres. However, the great majority of his works are now either lost, not publicly accessible, incomplete, or unrealized, as evident by the large number of missing published compositions.

== Works with opus numbers ==
The following is a list of Albéniz's works that have an Opus number.

- Op. 12: Pavana-Capricho for piano (1884)
- Op. 23: Barcarola in D♭ major for piano (1884)
- Op. 25: 6 Pequeños Valses for piano (1884)
  - No. 1 in A♭ major
  - No. 2 in E♭ major
  - No. 3 in A major
  - No. 4 in E♭ major
  - No. 5 in F major
  - No. 6 in A♭ major
- Op. 28: Piano Sonata No. 1 in A♭ major (1884)
  - First movement:
  - Second movement: Scherzo
  - Third movement:
  - Fourth movement (?):
- Op. 37: Danzas Españolas for piano (1887)
  - No. 1 in D major
  - No. 2 in B♭ major
  - No. 3 in E♭ major
  - No. 4 in G major
  - No. 5 in A♭ major
  - No. 6 in D major
- Op. 40: Deseo, Estudio de Concierto in B minor for piano (1885)
- Op. 47: Suite Española No. 1 for piano (1882–89)
  - No. 1: Granada
  - No. 2: Cataluña
  - No. 3: Sevilla
  - No. 4: Cádiz (originally Célèbre Sérénade Espagnole, Op. 181)
  - No. 5: Asturias (originally Prélude from Chants d'Espagne, Op. 232)
  - No. 6: Aragón (originally Jota Aragonesa from Deux Danses Espagnoles, Op. 164)
  - No. 7: Castilla (originally Seguidillas from Chants d'Espagne, Op. 232)
  - No. 8: Cuba
- Op. 54: Suite Ancienne No. 1 for piano (1886)
  - No. 1: Gavotta
  - No. 2: Minueto
- Op. 56: Estudio Impromptu in B minor for piano (1886)
- Op. 60: Piano Sonata No. 2 (lost)
- Op. 64: Suite Ancienne No. 2 for piano (1886)
  - No. 1: Sarabanda
  - No. 2: Chaconne
- Op. 65: 7 estudios en los tonos naturales mayores for piano (1886)
  - No. 1 in C major
  - No. 2 in G major
  - No. 3 in D major
  - No. 4 in A major
  - No. 5 in E major
  - No. 6 in B major
  - No. 7 in F major
- Op. 66:
  - Rapsodia Cubana for piano
  - 6 Mazurkas de salon for piano
- Op. 68: Piano Sonata No. 3 in A♭ major (1886)
  - First Movement: Allegretto
  - Second Movement: Andante
  - Third Movement: Allegro assai
- Op. 70: Rapsodia Española for piano and orchestra (1886)
- Op. 71: Recuerdos de Viaje for piano (1886–87)
  - No. 1: En el mar (barcarola)
  - No. 2: Leyenda (barcarola)
  - No. 3: Alborada
  - No. 4: En la Alhambra
  - No. 5: Puerta de Tierra
  - No. 6: Rumores de la Caleta (malagueña)
  - No. 7: En la playa
- Op. 72: Piano Sonata No. 4 in A major (1887)
  - First Movement: Allegro
  - Second Movement: Scherzo: Allegro
  - Third Movement: Minuetto: Andantino
  - Fourth Movement: Rondo: Allegro
- Op. 78: Concierto Fantástico for piano and orchestra (1887)
  - First Movement: Allegro ma non troppo
  - Second Movement: Rêverie et Scherzo: Andante – Presto
  - Third Movement: Allegro
- Op. 80: Recuerdos, Mazurka in G♭ major for piano
- Op. 81: Mazurka de Salon in E♭ major for piano
- Op. 82: Piano Sonata No. 5 in G♭ major (1887 ca.)
  - First Movement: Allegro non troppo
  - Second Movement: Minuetto del Gallo
  - Third Movement: Rêverie
  - Fourth Movement: Allegro
- Op. 83: Pavana fácil para manos pequeñas for piano (1888)
- Op. 92: 12 Piezas características for piano (1888)
  - No. 1: Gavotte
  - No. 2: Minuetto a Sylvia
  - No. 3: Barcarola (Ciel sans nuages)
  - No. 4: Plegaria
  - No. 5: Conchita (Polka)
  - No. 6: Pilar (Vals)
  - No. 7: Zambra
  - No. 8: Pavana
  - No. 9: Polonesa
  - No. 10: Mazurka
  - No. 11: Staccato (Capricho)
  - No. 12: Torre Bermeja (Serenata)
- Op. 95: Mazurka de Salon in E♭ major ("Amalia") for piano (1888)
- Op. 96: Mazurka de Salon in D minor ("Ricordatti") for piano (1889)
- Op. 97: Suite Española No. 2 for piano (1888)
  - No. 1: Zaragoza
  - No. 2: Sevilla (in spite of the name, this is a different piece from Sevilla featured in Suite Española No. 1)
  - No. 3: Cádiz-gaditana (originally published independently)
  - No. 4: Zambra granadina (originally published independently)
- Op. 101: Rêves for piano (1891)
  - No. 1: Berceuse
  - No. 2: Scherzino
  - No. 3: Canton de amor
- Op. 102: Berceuse for cello/violin and piano
- Op. 111: Piano Sonata No. 7 in E♭ major
  - First movement:
  - Second movement: Minuetto
  - Third movement:
  - Fourth movement (?):
- Op. 164: 2 Danzas Espagñoles for piano (1889 ca.)
  - No. 1: Jota Aragonesa
  - No. 2: Tango
- Op. 165: España for piano (1890)
  - No. 1: Preludio
  - No. 2: Tango
  - No. 3: Malagueña
  - No. 4: Serenata
  - No. 5: Capricho Catalan
  - No. 6: Zortzico
- Op. 170: L'Automne-Valse for piano (1890s)
- Op. 181: Célèbre sérénade Espagnole for piano (1889 ca.)
- Op. 201: Les saisons for piano (1892)
  - No. 1: Le printemps
  - No. 2: L'été
  - No. 3: L'automne
  - No. 4: L'hiver
- Op. 202: Mallorca for piano
- Op. 232: Cantos de España for piano (1892, rev.1898)
  - No. 1: Prelude
  - No. 2: Orientale
  - No. 3: Sous le palmier
  - No. 4: Córdoba
  - No. 5: Seguidillas

== Works without opus number ==
The rest of known works from Albéniz, which also includes ones that are lost, partially lost, incomplete, publicly inaccessible, or unrealized compositions. Some of the works listed in this section have an unknown opus number, however they are not listed in the section above to preserve the accuracy.

=== Works for piano ===
- Angustia: Romanza sin palabras (1886)
- Arbola-pian, zortzico
- Azulejos (incomplete; finished by Enrique Granados) (1909)
- Balbina Valverde
- Cádiz-gaditana
- Champagne
- 6 Danzas españolas
- Diva sin par (1886)
- Iberia in 4 books (1907-1908)
  - Book 1:
    - Evocación
    - El puerto
    - Fête-Dieu à Séville
  - Book 2:
    - Rondeña
    - Almería
    - Triana
  - Book 3:
    - El Albaicín
    - El polo
    - Lavapiés
  - Book 4:
    - Málaga
    - Jerez
    - Eritaña
- 3 Improvisations (Live performances recorded at the home of Ruperto Regordosa Planas on three Wax Cylinders in 1903. Transcribed by pianist Milton Ruben Laufer in 2009.)
- Marcha Militar (1868)
- Minuetto No. 1 (lost)
- Minuetto No. 2 (lost)
- Minuetto No. 3 in A-flat major
- Navarra (incomplete; finished by his pupil Déodat de Séverac)
- Piano Sonata No. 6 (lost)
- Serenata árabe
- 2 Souvenirs: Prelude, Asturias (1899)
- Suite Ancienne No. 3
- La Vega (1897)
- Zambra Granadina
- Zortzico in B minor

=== Works for piano and orchestra ===
- Piano Concerto No. 2 in E (incomplete) (1892)

=== Chamber works ===
- Morceau de lecture for trombone and piano (1906)

=== Orchestral works ===
- Suite Catalonia (part 1 completed, part 2 and 3 unrealized)
- Suite característica (1889)
- Escenas Sinfonicas (1888)

=== Vocal works ===
==== Songs for solo voice and piano ====
- 6 baladas Marquesa de Boloños
- The Catepillar
- Chanson de Barberine
- Conseil tenu par les rats (incomplete)
- The gifts of God
- Il en est de l'amour
- Laughing at Love (incomplete)
- 2 morceaux en Prose
- Rimas de Bécquer (6 songs)
- 4 Songs
- 6 Songs (all but Nos. 2 and 3 are lost)
- To Nellie (6 songs)

==== For chorus ====
- Domine, ne in furore tuo funeral music from Psalm 6

=== Stage works ===
==== Zarzuelas ====
- Cuanto más viejo (1881–1882, lost)
- Catalanes de gracia (1882, lost)
- San Antonio de la Florida (1894)
- La real Hambra (1902, incomplete)

==== Operas ====
- The Magic Opal (1892–1893)
- Pepita Giménez (January 1895)
- Henry Clifford (May 1895)
- Merlin (1897–1902)
- Lancelot (1902–1903, incomplete)
- Guinevere (unrealized)
