= Granada (Albéniz) =

Granada is a piano composition by Isaac Albéniz, the opening piece from his 1886 work Suite Española No.1 Opus 47. It was premiered by the composer on 24 January 1886..

Originally written for piano, since being transcribed for guitar by Miguel Llobet, it has become one of the most important works of the classical guitar repertoire. It has been played and recorded by guitarists such as Julian Bream, Andrés Segovia and John Williams and many others. Walter Aaron Clark said, "Albeniz poured forth his emotions in works from the Romantic repertoire, and concluded with improvisations that might well have contained the thematic seeds that later sprouted into his Granada- inspired compositions."
