= Op. 232 =

In music, Op. 232 stands for Opus number 232. Compositions that are assigned this number include:

- Albéniz – Chants d'Espagne
- Albéniz – Córdoba
- Albéniz – Oriental
