= Rumores de la Caleta =

Rumores de la Caleta (Murmurs of the Cove), Op. 71, No. 6, is a composition by Isaac Albéniz. The piece is subtitled "Malagueña".

It is a "sensual and emotional courting dance from Málaga, although the piece was actually named after La Caleta beach in Cadiz.

Since it has been transcribed for guitar duet by Miguel Llobet it has become a well-known piece for classical guitar. It has been played and recorded by guitarists such as Julian Bream duet with John Williams and many others. Susan Miller said of it, "the soulfulness of Sevilla slid imperceptibly into Rumores de la Caleta. The slow, measured beats took on a life of their own, gathering the shadows, the passions, the cries of lovers and of hunted, wounded animals on moonlit night."

The italian violist Marco Misciagna has arranged this piece for solo viola.
