= Oriental (Albéniz) =

Composition by Isaac Albéniz

Oriental, Op. 232, No. 2, is a composition by Isaac Albéniz.

It was written for piano, in the key of D minor, as part of the suite Chants d'Espagne. Since it was transcribed for classical guitar by Miguel Llobet, it has become a notable piece for classical guitar, although not as popular as many of his other pieces. Andrés Segovia also recorded his version of Oriental in the 1950s, which was also performed by Stefano Grondona. It was played by the VCU Guitar Ensemble at the VCU Flamenco Festival in 2009.
