= Domingo Prat =

Argentine guitarist (1886–1944)

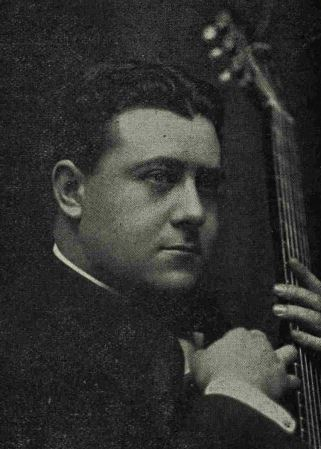
- Domingo Prat
- Born: Domingo Prat Marsal; 17 March 1886; Barcelona, Spain
- Died: 22 November 1944 (aged 58); Haedo, Argentina
- Occupation: Guitarist

Domingo Prat (17 March 1886 – 22 November 1944) was an Argentine guitarist, composer, and music educator of Spanish origin, considered one of the most important guitarists in Buenos Aires in the early 20th century.

== Life ==
Born in Barcelona, Spain, Prat was the son of amateur guitarist Tomás Prat Puig. He received his initial musical training at the Municipal School of Music in Barcelona. He studied guitar with Miguel Llobet and Francisco Tárrega from 1898 to 1904.

In 1904, he moved to Argentina and established himself as a guitar teacher in Buenos Aires in 1907. There, he spread the Tárrega school. Domingo Prat married guitarist Carmen Farré Ors, daughter of León Farré Duro, who worked with him, in 1909.

In 1934, he published the Diccionario de Guitarristas (Dictionary of Guitarists) in a limited-edition of 1605 copies, which is still used today as a reference work.

Thanks to his work, he became one of the most important guitarists in Buenos Aires in the early 20th century, alongside Julio Salvador Sagreras. Prat founded a conservatory in Haedo and taught many renowned guitarists, such as María Luisa Anido (from 1914).

Prat died in Haedo, Buenos Aires Province, Argentina, aged 58.

== Works ==
- Andante
- Bajo el sauce, milonga
- Danza española 1
- Estudio
- Güeya
- Jota
- Mazurka
- Pasionarias
- Recuerdo de Santiago del Estero
- Recuerdos de Saldungaray
- Variaciones sobre la Huella
