= Cataluña (Albéniz) =

1899 composition by Isaac Albéniz

Cataluña, Op. 47, No. 2, is a composition by Isaac Albéniz. It premiered as a piano performance in Paris in January 1899. Since it has been transcribed for classical guitar by Miguel Llobet, it has become one of the staples of classical guitar music. It has been performed and recorded by guitarists such as Julian Bream, John Williams, Milos Janjic, Charles Mokotoff and many others. It is usually played in the key of G minor.
