= El testament d'Amèlia =

Catalan folk song

El testament d'Amèlia is a popular Catalan folk song. It tells the story of a young lady in her deathbed who knowingly drank the poisoned drink given to her by her stepmother, whom she knows had been sleeping with her husband.

The song featured in a number of song books in the early twentieth century, including Joan Gay's 1901 Cançons populars de Catalunya and Enric Morera's 1910 Cançons populars catalanes. Miguel Llobet arranged the song for solo guitar in 1900. It is commonly known as the first part of Miguel Llobet's Canciones Populares Catalanas. Llobet's D minor arrangement has become the accepted classic version for this piece. It has been recorded by Llobet, Andrés Segovia, John Williams, Julian Bream, Pepe Romero, David Russell, Guy Bacon, Chet Atkins, Stefano Grondona and many others.

Roberto Gerhard quoted a fragment of the song in his L'Etranger (1954).

== Lyrics ==
The lyrics are written in ten stanzas of four verses which build the narrative until the completion of the ballad, with repetition of a two verse refrain which repeats several times throughout the song. For example, the third stanza states the dramatic shift in the narrative where Amelia realizes her fate singing the four verses of the stanza followed by the two verse refrain intoned as:

'Mother, oh my mother:
You know very well the reason!
You have given me poisons
That cause my heart to become twisted.'

Oh, my heart is becoming knotted
Like a bouquet of carnations!

== See also ==
- Seny
