= Cádiz (Albéniz) =

Music composition by Isaac Albéniz

Cádiz is a composition by Isaac Albéniz, originally written for piano. After the composer's death, his publisher included it in an enlarged edition of the Suite española. The suite comprises pieces with geographical titles; in this case the title refers to the Spanish city of Cádiz or its province. This piece does not correlate with the music of Cádiz nor traditional Saetas but however it does exemplify traditional Spanish folk song. Albéniz’s own oeuvre of this esteemed piece is Célèbre Sérénade Espagnol, Op. 181.

== Version for guitar ==
Since it has been transcribed for classical guitar by Miguel Llobet, it has become one of the most important works of the classical guitar repertoire. It has been played and recorded by guitarists such as Julian Bream and John Williams and many others. It is a patriotic, bright sounding piece, generally played in the key of A major.
