= Op. 165 =

In music, Op. 165 stands for Opus number 165. Compositions that are assigned this number include:

- Albéniz – Tango in D
- Reinecke – Ein Märchen ohne Worte
- Saint-Saëns – Le printemps
