= Asturias (Leyenda) =

Musical work by Isaac Albéniz

Asturias (Leyenda), named simply Prelude by its composer, is a musical work by the Spanish composer and pianist Isaac Albéniz (1860–1909).

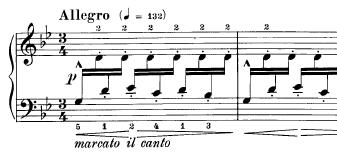
The opening is shown here in piano score. The repeated D is an example of the use of a pedal note.

The piece, which lasts around six minutes in performance, was originally written for the piano and set in the key of G minor. It was first published in Barcelona, by Juan Bta. Pujol & Co., in 1892 as the prelude of a three-movement set entitled Chants d'Espagne.

The name Asturias (Leyenda) was given to it posthumously by the German publisher Hofmeister, who included it in the 1911 "complete version" of the Suite española, although Albéniz never intended the piece for this suite. Despite the new name, this music is not considered suggestive of the folk music of the northern Spanish region of Asturias, but rather of Andalusian flamenco traditions (although the drama of the music is congruent with the landscape of the region of Asturias). The origin of the presumably misattributed name was that in fact Albéniz did compose a piano work actually called (by himself) 'Asturias', which made part of a set of pieces of folk music from all over Spain for the then Queen of Spain, but this piece is lost, and maybe its name was passed on the now so called one. Leyenda, Hofmeister's subtitle, means legend. The piece is noted for the delicate, intricate melody of its middle section and abrupt dynamic changes.

Albéniz's biographer, Walter Aaron Clark, describes the piece as "pure Andalusian flamenco". In the main theme the piano mimics the guitar technique of alternating the thumb and fingers of the right hand, playing a pedal-note open string with the index finger and a melody with the thumb. The theme itself suggests the rhythm of the bulería—a fast flamenco form. The "marcato"/"staccato" markings suggest both guitar sounds and the footwork of a flamenco dancer. The piece sounds as though it is written in the Phrygian mode which is typical of bulerías. The second section is reminiscent of a copla—a sung verse following a specific form. Clark states that it is written in typical Albéniz form as it is "presented monophonically but doubled at the fifteenth for more fullness of sound." The music alters between a solo and accompaniment that is typical of flamenco. The short middle section of the piece is written in the style of a malagueña—another flamenco style piece. The malagueña borrows two motives from the previous copla and builds on them. The piece returns to its first theme until a slow "hymn-like" passage ends the piece.

== Guitar versions ==
Asturias performed at the White House by Sharon Isbin (2009; the centennial year of the composer's death).

Although originally written to imitate guitar playing, the piece cannot be transcribed note for note for guitar. The original version makes uses of the piano keyboard's wider range compared to the tessitura of the guitar, and the key of G minor is not suitable for the guitar. For example, in the standard guitar tuning, the pedal note D4 is not an open string.

Many have attributed the first transcription for guitar to Francisco Tárrega, who put it in its most recognizable key, E minor, putting the pedal note on the open B string.

According to the guitarist and guitar scholar Stanley Yates, the first guitar transcription of the piece was probably by Severino García Fortea, although Andrés Segovia's transcription is the most famous and most influential.

The piece has become one of the most important works of the classical guitar repertoire.

== Influences ==
Legend (Leyenda)
Arrangement for castanets, bass and guitar, performed in 2001 by Michael Laucke (6:53)

Suite Española, Op. 47 – 5. Asturias (Leyenda)
Performed on a guitar by Gordon Rowland.

- Robbie Krieger, guitarist of The Doors, uses a reworking of the melody from this classical piece in song "Spanish Caravan" from their 1968 album Waiting for the Sun.
- Iron Maiden quoted Asturias in their songs "Mother Russia" and "To Tame A Land".
- Children of Bodom attributed their "Angels Don't Kill" song to Asturias.
- Italian violist Marco Misciagna arranged this piece for solo viola.
- Rammstein's song "Deutschland" was inspired by the song.
- Anne Clark's "Our Darkness" was inspired by Asturias.
- Elley Duhé's song "Middle of the Night" is based on Asturias.
- Jam & Spoon's song "Right in the Night (Fall in Love with Music)" was inspired by Asturias.
- The Chantays sample the middle chord progression in their 1962 song "Pipeline (instrumental)"
