= Nocturnal after John Dowland =

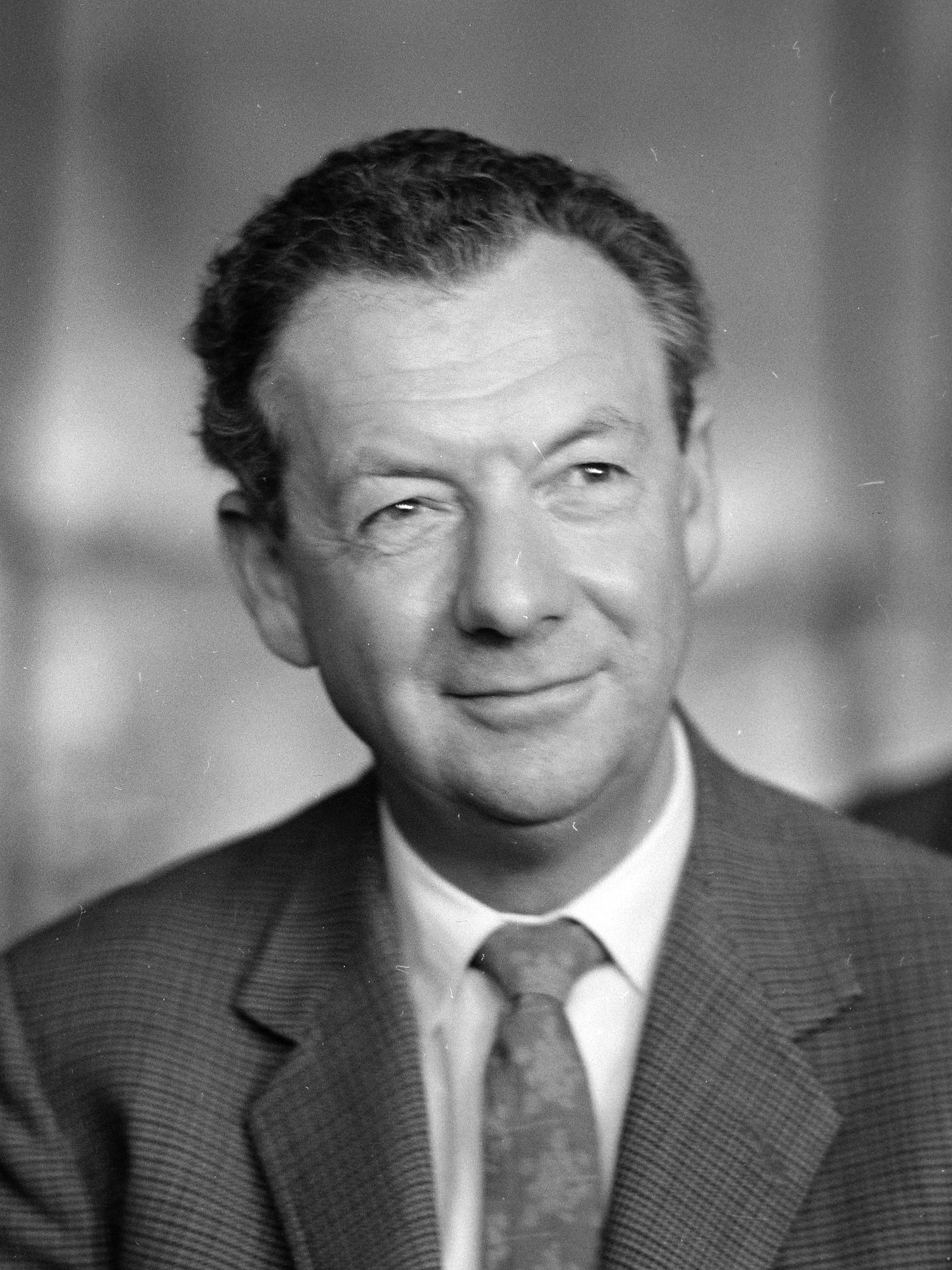
Benjamin Britten in 1965

Nocturnal After John Dowland, Op. 70 is a classical guitar piece composed in 1963 by English composer Benjamin Britten for guitarist Julian Bream. It is considered one of the most influential works written in the twentieth century for the classical guitar.

Julian Bream premiered the piece on 12 June 1964.

== Form ==
The piece is a sort of reverse theme & variations (it is called "Reflections") on Come Heavy Sleepe from John Dowland's First Book of Songs (1597). Rather than begin the piece with the main theme followed by its variations, the theme does not appear in its original form until the very end. Each variation contains fragments of Dowland's theme, most notably the use of the perfect fourth interval. The variations move progressively closer to the Dowland song concluding the piece.

The nine movements are as follows:

1. Musingly
2. Very Agitated
3. Restless
4. Uneasy
5. March-like
6. Dreaming
7. Gently Rocking
8. Passacaglia
9. Slow and Quiet (Dowland's theme)
