= Guillermo Morphy =

Spanish Noble and music critic

Guillermo Morphy Count
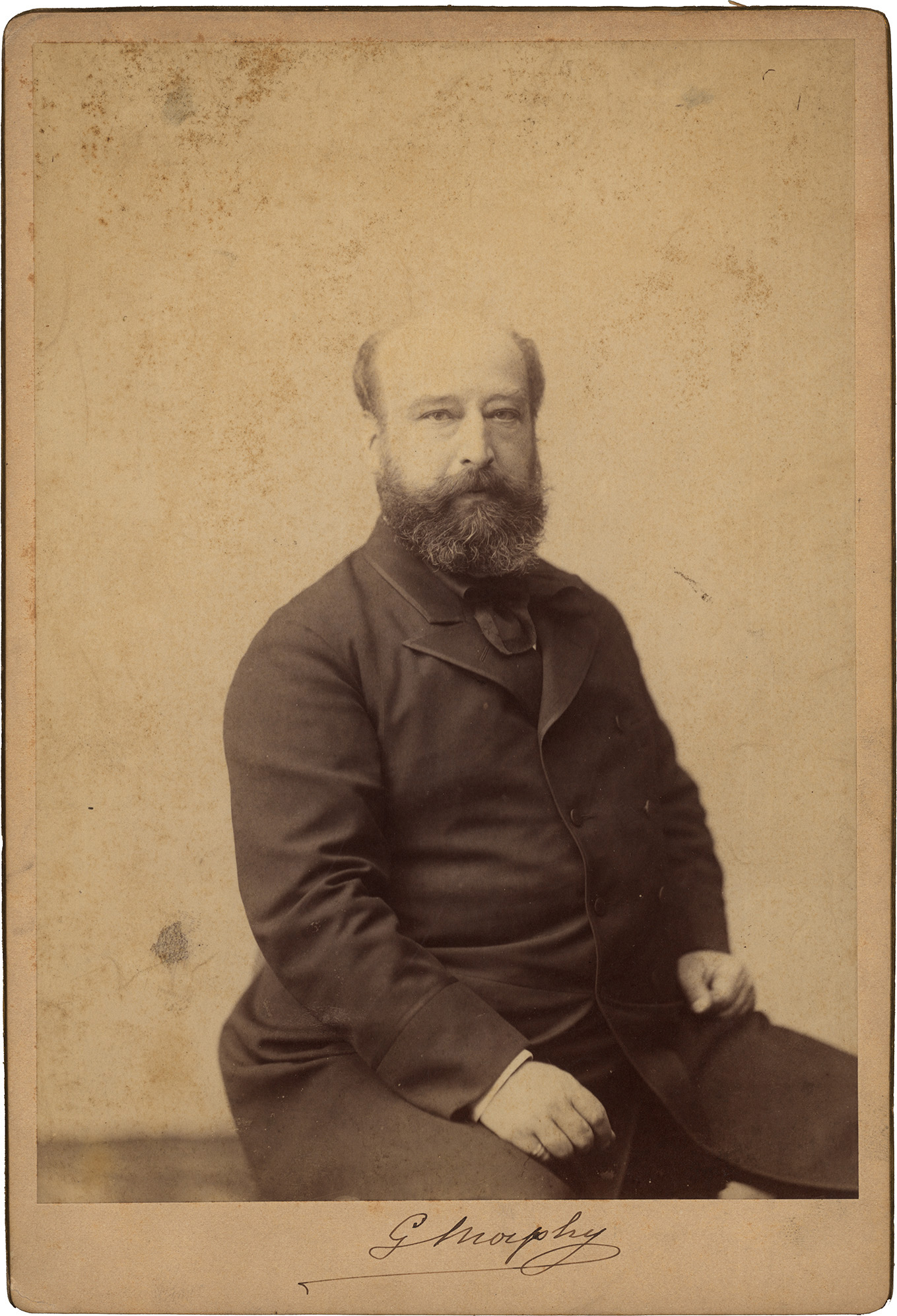
- Born: Guillermo Morphy y Ferríz de Guzmán; February 29, 1836; Madrid, Spain
- Died: August 28, 1899 (aged 63); Baden, Switzerland
- Other name: Conde Morphy or Count Morphy
- Education: Royal Academy of Fine Arts of San Fernando
- Occupations: Spanish aristocrat, music critic, musicologist, historian, educator, composer and politician

Guillermo Morphy y Ferríz de Guzmán, best known as Conde de Morphy or Count Morphy (February 29, 1836, in Madrid – August 28, 1899, in Baden, Switzerland) was a Spanish aristocrat, music critic, musicologist, historian, educator, composer and politician. He became personal secretary to King Alfonso XII of Spain in 1875. He became a highly admired figure in artistic circles of the late nineteenth century Madrid, and for his service to the Crown of Spain. He was a friend of Isaac Albéniz, for whom he arranged a grant to study at the Royal Conservatory of Brussels. He served as director of the Royal Concert Society at the Teatro Real in Madrid until 1891.

== Biography ==
Born in Madrid on February 29, 1836, he was of Irish descent, son of Joseph Morphy. He spent his childhood traveling through France, Italy and Germany, among other countries, where he had a European renaissance education becoming a lover of art and literature. He lived for two years in Germany between 1846 and 1848. In 1858, he took over his father's law firm. In 1863 he took classes under the composer François-Joseph Fétis in Brussels. When he returned he entered the Royal Palace of Madrid on November 28, 1863, as a gentleman of the then Prince of Asturias and future King Alfonso XII of Spain, a position he held until the Revolution in 1868 that overthrew Isabel II.

He moved to France to engage in musicology, and during the Franco-Prussian War he traveled to Vienna to be with Prince Alfonso. There he composed the opera Lizzie and other orchestral parts. On the Bourbon Restoration, he returned to Spain with the King, who appointed him his personal secretary on January 18, 1875, and granted him the title Count Morphy on May 3, 1882. He published several studies and translated into Spanish a biography of Beethoven, and in 1892 entered the Royal Academy of Fine Arts of San Fernando. He also served as director of the Royal Concert Society at the Teatro Real in Madrid until 1891.

Morphy was also an acquaintance and benefactor of several notable musicians of the time, such as Tomás Bretón, Pablo Casals and Isaac Albéniz. The count was a close friend of Albéniz in particular and was highly enthusiastic towards his talent, and it was Morphy who arranged for a grant for him to study at the Royal Conservatory of Brussels. Morphy also arranged for violinist Enrique Fernández Arbós to study under Henri Vieuxtemps in Brussels. Albéniz dedicated his composition Sevilla to Count Morphy's wife when he premiered in a piano performance in Paris on January 24, 1886. In late 1883, a number of musicians, led by Count Morphy, sharing the same concerns regarding the regeneration of Spanish art, gathered together in a society in Madrid to found the Philharmonic Institute with the aim of offering musical training at the same level as other European centres. The regenerative nature of their educational project, compared to the teachings of the Conservatory of Madrid, is highlighted. In particular, the bel canto school run by Napoleón Verger helped to improve the standard of singing in Spain and to endow opera stages with renowned figures, thus paving the way for the establishment of Spanish lyric drama. From 1886 to 1895, the Count of Morphy assumed a leading role as president of the Fine Arts section, he engaged with the activities of the society by giving lectures and by introducing the Ateneo to his own aesthetic principles, including his regenerationist agenda and his musical nationalism. He also extended invitations to some of the most relevant international figures and to a young generation of Spanish artists, with the intention of bringing the public closer to the European cultural scene. The Ateneo experienced a period of splendor with a new impulse in vocal, instrumental and chamber music, and a renewed repertoire with contemporary works by Spanish and Central European composers.

== Bibliography ==
Notes

References

- boileau-music.com (2012). "PIANO VOL. 1". boileau-music.com.
- Clark, Walter Aaron (1998). Isaac Albéniz: A Guide to Research (1998 ed.). Routledge. ISBN 9780815320951. - Total pages: 256
- Clark, Walter Aaron (2002). Isaac Albéniz: Portrait of a Romantic (2002 ed.). Oxford University Press. ISBN 9780199250523. - Total pages: 360
- Ruvigny, Melville H.; Massue, Melville Henry; Ruvigny, marquis de (2000). The Nobilities of Europe (2000 ed.). Elibron.com. ISBN 9781402185618. - Total pages: 488
