= Tango in D =

Tango in D major, Op.165 Nº2
Arranged for saxophone and piano, performed by Wasei Dúo at Museum of Romanticism (Madrid) on November 3, 2015. Duration is 2:25.

Tango in D, Op. 165, No. 2, is a composition by Isaac Albéniz. It was originally written for piano, as part of the suite España, Op. 165 (1890).

A slow, romantic piece, it is played in the key of D major. Norman Lloyd says of the piece, "The most famous tango in concert music is Isaac Albeniz' little Tango in D." Carl Van Vechten has said, "The Tango in D is striking, and crosses some pretty stiles, despite its brevity."

Since it has been transcribed for classical guitar by Miguel Llobet, it has become one of the most important works of the classical guitar repertoire. It has been played and recorded by guitarists such as Julian Bream and John Williams and many others.

It has also been arranged by Leopold Godowsky and others.
