= María Luisa Anido =

Argentine guitarist and composer

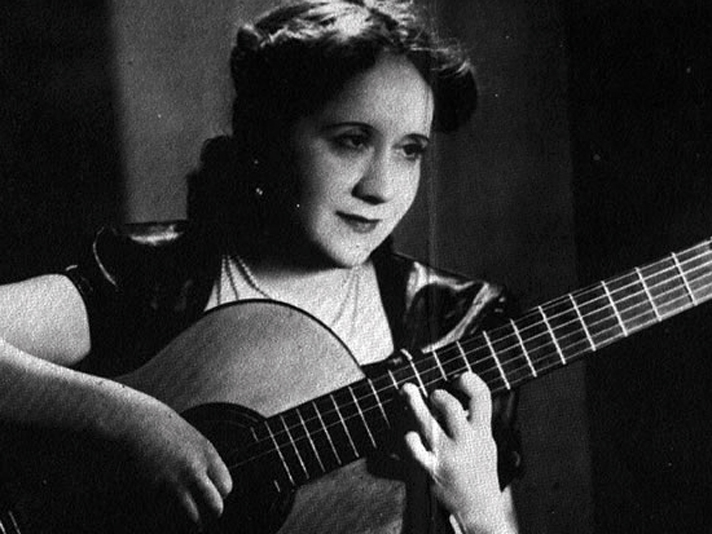
María Luisa Anido

María Luisa Anido (Isabel María Luisa Anido González) (26 January 1907 – 4 June 1996) was an Argentine classical guitarist and composer.

== Biography ==
She was born 26 January 1907 in Morón, in the province of Buenos Aires, Argentina. She was the fourth daughter of Juan Carlos Anido and Betilda González Rigaud. Her family moved to Buenos Aires when she was very young. She studied with Domingo Prat in Argentina and Miguel Llobet in Spain. From 1925, she frequently performed in Argentina together with Llobet. Her first London appearance was in 1952 at the Wigmore Hall, and she spent several years in the 1960s performing and teaching in Russia. Later, she became professor at the conservatory of Buenos Aires. By the mid-1980s she lived again near Barcelona and died in Tarragona.

== María Luisa Anido's compositions for guitar ==
"Composing is a wonderful task because of the sincerity it carries within, because of the act of creation […] because it reveals the greatest depths of the human soul." — María Luisa Anido

María Luisa Anido was one of the few female composer-performers of her time. Her compositions are mainly miniatures that reflect several aspects of her personality. Aire Norteño, her most popular piece, is a 'Bailecito', a little dance present in all festivities in north-western Argentina, which is generally accompanied by charangos, quenas and cajas. Anido emphasizes the juxtaposition of 3/4 time in the bass and 6/8 in the melody, a characteristic that is frequently found in Argentine folk music.

In 1927, Anido composed her first piece, Barcarola. Miguel Llobet, the Catalan guitarist, wrote to her shortly after that: "I have read and played your Barcarola; the voices are carried magnificently with admirable taste of their natural characteristics; the tone colours are perfect. Bravo, very well done. I think you should continue writing your excellent inspirations."

In Canción del Yucatán, Anido alternates the characteristic Habanera rhythm with triples and rubatos that mark the sweet and feminine character of the piece. Following Llobet's example, she recreates, through glissandi and exquisite legato, the intimate atmosphere of the Mexican song 'Adiós ... Adiós ...'.

Much of her music is inspired by Argentine folklore. Preludio campero illustrates the attitude of the gaucho as he improvises chords on his guitar until a small melody appears, without any hurry, with the tranquillity and liberty that the immensity of the pampas imparts. A pedal in De mi Tierra rocks in a continuous movement. She is not afraid of the high positions on the guitar, so she plays with melodies in the higher notes, contrasting with that ostinato bass.

In 1952, she travelled through Europe for the first time, and Bèrben in Italy published her Aire de Vidalita. This piece was inspired by one of the most popular lyric songs of Argentine folklore. The musicologist Carlos Vega said: "The 'vidalitas' are little songs of various characters and tempos. Sometimes they are tender love songs, sometimes cheerful, lively carnival songs. They became especially popular in Buenos Aires by the end of the 19th century. Their poetic form is not uniform, but generally it is a quatrain where the word 'vidalita' appears between the first and second and between the third and the fourth lines as follows:

los días mas bellos, vidalita
tienen su hora amarga
y hasta en la agonía, vidalita
luce la esperanza.

María Luisa Anido prepares the theme with four bars of guitaristic arpeggios. The melody of the piece respects its characteristic rhythm, but instead of flowing in a homophone way or through parallel thirds, sixths or tenths, it is built as a chorale in four voices, which gives it a special depth. The Gato that concludes this group is one of the most popular dances. Its choreography can vary according to the region where it is danced, but it always keeps a picaresque character, and, like most Argentine dances, is repeated twice. After an introduction of 8 bars (generally accompanied by the dancers and audience clapping hands) the melody flows wittily and freely over a very simple harmonic ground.

Departing from folkloric influences, Anido composed Canción de Cuna, which was published in Italy in 1953. The triplet figure that serves as upbeat to each bar reflects the rocking movement of a cradle or a mother's arms. This impressionist miniature once again reveals her acute sensitivity.

Impressiones Argentinas was published in Argentina in 1953. This is a set of nine pieces that embrace almost all the nuances of Argentine folklore. In Boceto indígena, dedicated to Lalyta Almirón (a child prodigy born in 1914 who was the first Argentine guitarist to play in Europe), Anido alternates a Baguala rhythm with a tempo de danza and uses one of her favourite and original effects: harmonic tones in the basses of a two-voice melody. Damped basses or notes plucked with the tip of the thumb (Anido did not use her thumbnail) add a special colour to the accompaniment. In Preludio Pampeano, a melody that is carried in thirds, gives way to a tempo de Vidalita. Variaciones camperas, whose rhythmical alternation between 3/4 and 6/8, represents an invitation to dance, belong to the same geographical region.

Santiagueña' (dedicated to her agent Omar Buschiazzo) is a characteristic Chacarera from Santiago del Estero, and Catamarqueña, based on the Vidala that is typical of Catamarca. The Vidala is a song cried to the winds and to the echoes of the ravines, singing of love, forgiveness, landscapes, and religion. After an instrumental introduction, Anido presents the theme of the 'Catamarqueña' the way a Vidala is usually sung, in parallel thirds. Some ornaments in the melody imitate the typical kenko (melodic ornamentation). The pizzicato basses remind us of the caja, whose percussion generally accompanies the melody. Returning to the Pampas area, the "Alegremente" of Preludio Criollo contrasts with the mainly obscure tones of Canto a la Llanura.

El Misachico (also called by Anido "Procesión Coya") is dedicated to her mother. In the northwest of Argentina, Misachico is the name given to small processions, carrying the profusely ornamented image of a saint that belongs to a family, not to the church. Some musicians accompany them playing erkes, violins and cajas or bombos.

The Preludios Nostálgicos reflect the periods in which Anido lived far away from her country. Lejanía, dedicated to her pupil Omar Atreo, was composed in 1962 and published in 1971 in Buenos Aires. Mar and Gris were published in Spain in 1977. An impressionistic atmosphere imbues their arpeggiated chordal structure. Lejanía shows its melancholy through slow arpeggios, Mar flows in continuous movement and transformation and Gris reflects a feeling of peace and plenitude.

== Discography ==
- 1955: A Spanish Guitar Recital (Capitol Records P18014)
- 1971: Maria Luisa Anido (Victor SMK-7705)
- 1972: Grande Dame De La Guitare (Erato STU 70722)

== Bibliography ==
- Maria Luisa Anido: Una Vida a Contramano by Aldo Rodríguez Delgado
