= Jean-Marc Zvellenreuther =

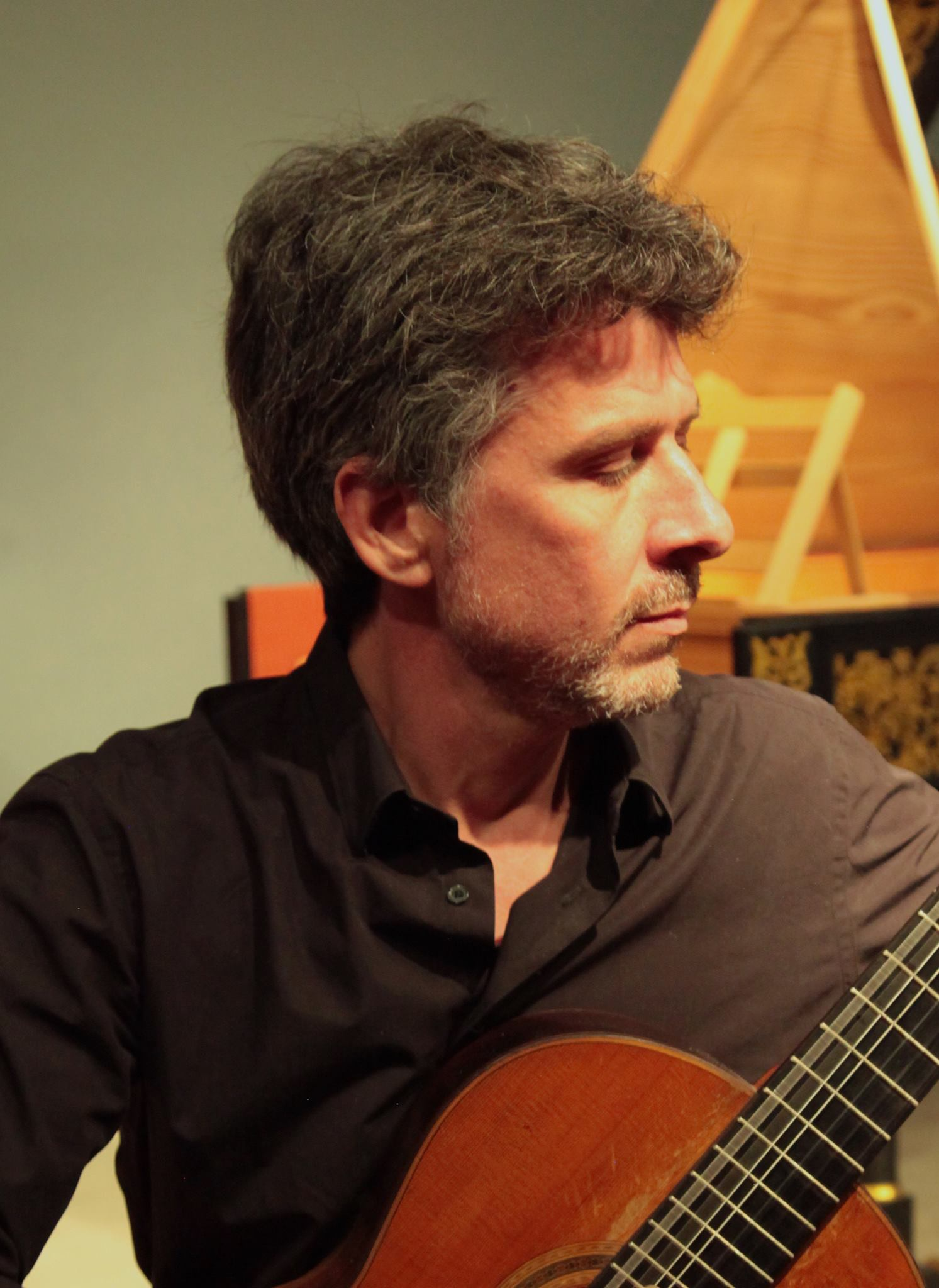

Background information
- Born: October 26, 1967 (age 58)
- Genres: Classical
- Instrument: Guitar

Jean-Marc Zvellenreuther (born 26 October 1967) is a French classical guitarist.

== Life ==
Guitarist, teacher, and conductor, Zvellenreuther followed Alberto Ponce's teaching at the École Normale de Musique de Paris, before becoming his assistant at the Conservatoire de Paris. The Spanish master passed on the secrets of his art to him, perpetuating the tradition of Francisco Tárrega and Emilio Pujol.

1st prize in the 1988 Carpentras International Guitar Competition, he is the winner of the international competitions in San Rémo (Italy), Printemps de la guitare (Belgium) and Ségovia (Spain), among others.

A founding member, with Florentino Calvo, of the Polycord Trio, Zvellenreuther regularly performs at the Paris Opera, with the orchestras of Radio France, with the Ensemble Intercontemporain, etc.

== Discography ==
- Isaac Albeniz' Iberia (LFM)
- Novecento pianist by A. Baricco, music by Alexandros Markeas
- Folias for guitar (LFM)
- Impressions d’Espagne (Triton)
- Trio Polycordes volume 1 (LFM)
- Trio Polycordes volume 2 (LFM)
- Trio Polycordes volume 3 (LFM)
- In memoriam Frédérick Martin, Trio Polycordes (LFM)
- Complete Emilio Pujol's work (collective work)
- Petite géographie sentimentale de la banquise (improvised music, LFM)
- Berlioz's Sérénade de Méphistophélès, with Roberto Alagna (EMI)
- Magdalena Kozena's French Arias (DGG)
- Florentino Calvo's Portraits en forme de miroir (LFM)
