= Córdoba (Albéniz) =

1898 composition by Isaac Albéniz

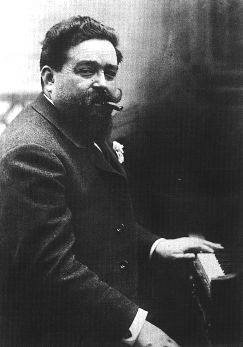
Isaac Albéniz in 1901

Córdoba, Op. 232, No. 4, is a composition by Isaac Albéniz. It was originally written for piano as part of Chants d'Espagne and was published in 1898.

Since it has been transcribed for guitar by Miguel Llobet, it has become one of the staples of classical guitar music. John Williams describes the piece as "real guitar music" and which he believes to be partly inspired by the Great Mosque of Córdoba in Córdoba, Andalusia. One author said "The beauty and romance, which is the particular charm of the city of Cordoba, inspired this composition."
