= Mallorca (Albéniz) =

Composition by Isaac Albéniz

Mallorca, Op 202 or Majorca is a composition by Isaac Albéniz. Since it has been transcribed for classical guitar it has become an important work for the classical guitar repertoire. It has been played and recorded by guitarists such as Andres Segovia, Julian Bream and John Williams and many others. Although the original key as written for piano is F# minor, Mallorca is almost always transposed and played in the key of D minor for guitar. John Williams once said "I'd like to play Mallorca, a piece depicting a mysterious, beautiful island with a Moorish influence."
