= Sevilla (Albéniz) =

Sevilla is a composition by Isaac Albéniz from his Suite Española No. 1, Op. 47. Albeniz premiered Sevilla himself in a piano performance on 24 January 1886 and dedicated it to the wife of Count Morphy. Since it has been transcribed for classical guitar it has become one of the most important works of the classical guitar repertoire. It has been played and recorded by guitarists such as Julian Bream and John Williams and many others. It is generally played in the key of G major.

Albéniz wrote an entirely different composition also named Sevilla as the second movement for his Suite Española No. 2, Op. 97. It is in D major and dedicated to Theophile Benard.
