= Walter Aaron Clark =

American musicologist

- Education: University of North Carolina School of the Arts (BM); University of California, San Diego (MA); University of California, Los Angeles (PhD in musicology)
- Occupation: Musicologist

Walter Aaron Clark is an American musicologist. He is a distinguished professor in the department of music at the University of California, Riverside.
