= Iberia (Albéniz) =

Suite for piano composed by Isaac Albéniz

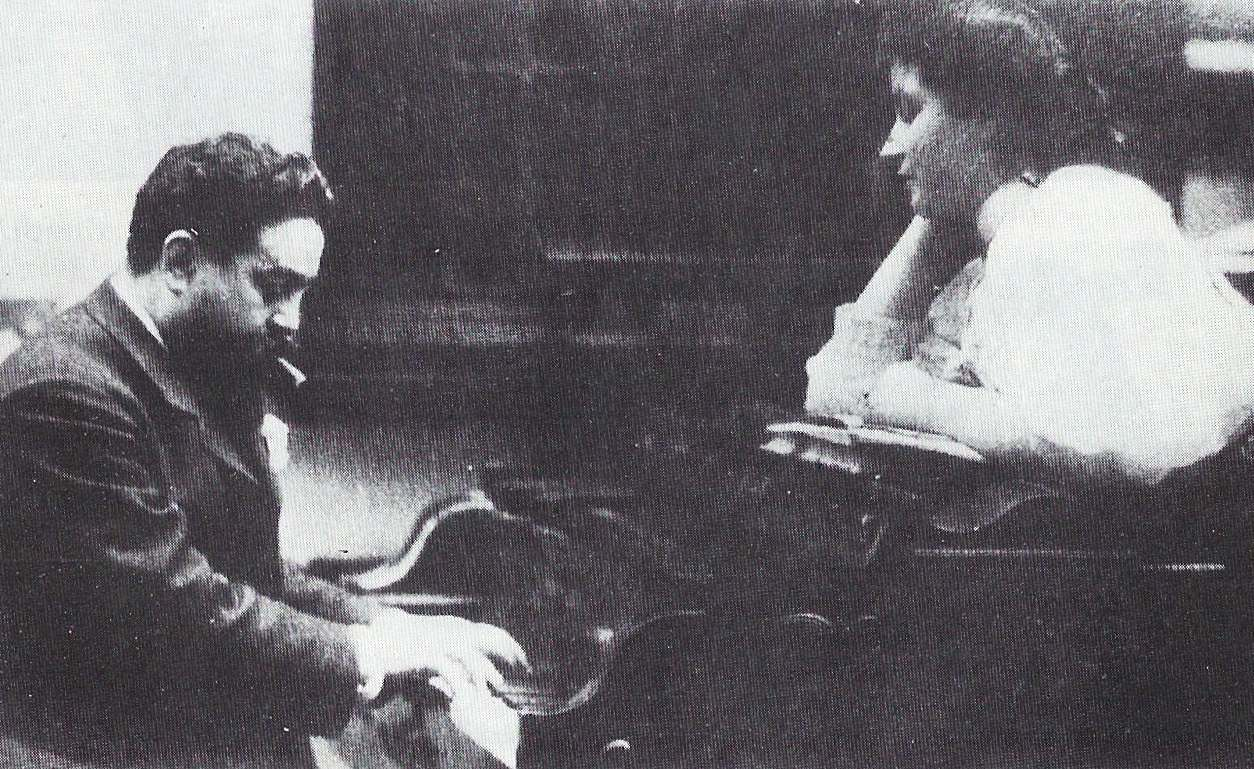
Isaac Albéniz with his daughter Laura, 1905

Iberia is a suite for piano composed between 1905 and 1909 by the Spanish composer Isaac Albéniz. It is composed of four books of three pieces each; a complete performance lasts about 90 minutes.

It is Albéniz's best-known work and considered his masterpiece. It was highly praised by Claude Debussy and Olivier Messiaen, who said: "Iberia is the wonder for the piano; it is perhaps on the highest place among the more brilliant pieces for the king of instruments". Stylistically, this suite falls squarely in the school of Impressionism, especially in its musical evocations of Spain.

It is considered one of the most challenging works for the piano: "There is really nothing in Isaac Albeniz's Iberia that a good three-handed pianist could not master, given unlimited years of practice and permission to play at half tempo. But there are few pianists thus endowed."

== Composition ==
=== Book 1 ===
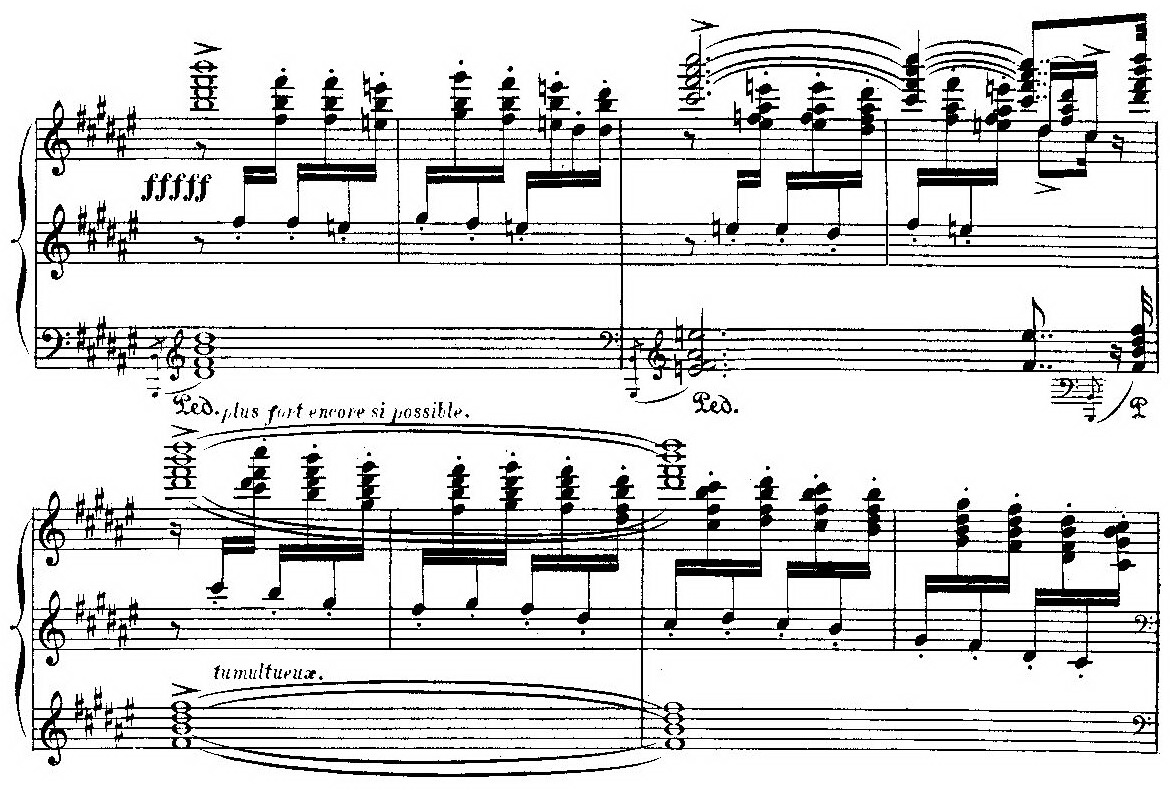
Score of an excerpt from El Corpus Christi en Sevilla, which gives an idea of the complexity of the writing for piano.

Dedicated to Ernest Chausson's wife.

- Evocación ("Evocation", A♭ minor and A♭ major), an impressionist reminiscence of Albéniz's native country, combining elements of the southern Spanish fandango and the northern Spanish jota song forms. It includes the rarely seen key signature of seven flats.
- El Puerto (D♭ major), a zapateado inspired by El Puerto de Santa María, in Cádiz.
- Fête-dieu à Séville (F♯ minor and F♯ major) (alternative titles sometimes found: Corpus Christi; El Corpus en Sevilla), describing the Corpus Christi Day procession in Seville, during which the Corpus Christi is carried through the streets accompanied by marching bands. Musically, this piece consists of a processional march that eventually becomes overwhelmed by a mournful saeta, the melody evoking Andalusian cante jondo and the accompaniment evoking flamenco guitars. The march and saeta alternate ever more loudly until the main march theme is restated as a lively tarantella that ends abruptly with a flamboyant ffff climactic chord; the piece concludes with a gentle coda again evoking flamenco guitars along with distant church bell sounds.

=== Book 2 ===
Rondeña, from Book II.

- Rondeña (D major), after the Andalusian town of Ronda. A variant of the fandango, it is characterized by the alternation of measures of 6/8 and 3/4.
- Almería (G major), relating to the Andalusian seaport of Almería, is loosely based on tarantas, a flamenco form characteristic of the region of Almería.
- Triana (F♯ minor), after the Gypsy quarter of Seville.

=== Book 3 ===
- El Albaicín (B♭ minor and B♭ major) after the Albaicín, district of Granada.
- El Polo (F minor) after the Polo (flamenco palo) .
- Lavapiés (D♭ major), after the district of Madrid.

=== Book 4 ===
- Málaga (B♭ minor and B♭ major)
- Jerez (A minor – arguably E Phrygian – and E major)
- Eritaña (E♭ major) from La Venta de Eritaña, a popular inn outside Seville where Flamenco dance was performed

== Premiere performance ==
The twelve pieces were first performed by the French pianist Blanche Selva, but each book was premiered in a different place and on a different date. Three of the performances were in Paris, the other being in a small town in the south of France.

- Book I: May 9, 1906, Salle Pleyel, Paris
- Book II: September 11, 1907, Saint-Jean-de-Luz
- Book III: January 2, 1908, Palace of Princess de Polignac, Paris
- Book IV: February 9, 1909, Société Nationale de Musique, Paris.

== Recordings ==
Among notable early recordings, pieces from Iberia were recorded by Arthur Rubinstein. Alicia de Larrocha is widely believed to have been the first pianist to record the complete cycle in 1958-9 (Hispavox / Erato DUE 20236/37, [EMI 64504?]), however this is incorrect. The first complete recorded Iberia cycle appears to be Leopoldo Querol's, published in 1954 by Ducretet-Thomson as a 2 LP set LPG 8557-8558. It was followed in 1955 by José Falgarona on VOX – PL-9212. Alicia de Larrocha recorded it three more times, in 1961 or 1962 again for Hispavox in stereo (Hispavox HH 10-89/90), in 1972 (London 448191 and 433926), and 1986 (London 417887). The suite was also recorded by Luis Fernando Pérez, which has been highly acclaimed and earned him the Albéniz Medal. It has also been recorded by Claudio Arrau (Books 1 and 2 only). Gustavo Díaz-Jerez, whose 2009 CD recording also won him the 2010 Albéniz Medal, is the first pianist to record Iberia in DVD and High Definition Video. Other pianists that have audio recordings of Iberia include Miguel Baselga, Ricardo Requejo, Michel Block, Guillermo González (according to his own critical edition of the score), Marc-André Hamelin, Yvonne Loriod, Marek Jablonski, Artur Pizarro, Jean-François Heisser, Esteban Sánchez, Kotaro Fukuma, and Ángel Sanzo, Daniel del Pino, among many others.

== Arrangements ==
In 1920 Ballets Suédois used a specially commissioned orchestration of three pieces from Iberia, made by the French conductor and composer Désiré-Émile Inghelbrecht. This is often overlooked in favour of the better-known arrangements by Enrique Fernández Arbós. Carlos Surinach also arranged pieces from Iberia for full orchestra. There is an orchestral arrangement of the Fête-dieu à Seville by Leopold Stokowski, from the mid-1920s, which he recorded with the Philadelphia Orchestra in 1928.

More recently, Peter Breiner arranged the whole work for full orchestra. The composer Francisco Guerrero Marín, calling Iberia "the greatest Spanish work in the last hundred years", also made an arrangement of six pieces before his death in 1997. A version for three guitars was made by Christophe Dejour and recorded by Trio Campanella. A two-guitar overdubbing version has been released by French guitarist Jean-Marc Zvellenreuther.

An invitation to Ravel to orchestrate six pieces from Iberia was the genesis of his Boléro. He would begin to orchestrate the piece before learning that Iberia's arrangement copyright was held by Árbos. Only an incomplete unpublished transcription of Rodeña exists.
