= Isaac Albéniz =

Spanish composer (1860–1909)

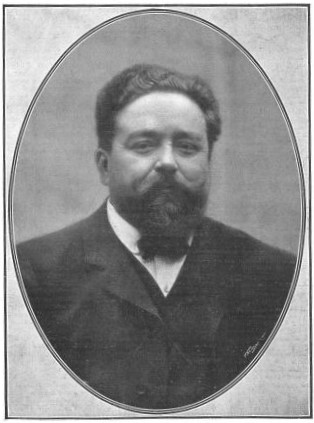
- Born: Isaac Manuel Francisco Albéniz y Pascual; 29 May 1860; Camprodon, Catalonia, Spain
- Died: 18 May 1909 (aged 48); Cambo-les-Bains, France
- Resting place: Montjuïc Cemetery, Barcelona
- Occupations: Composer, conductor, pianist
- Years active: 1864−1909

Isaac Manuel Francisco Albéniz y Pascual (Spanish: [iˈsak alˈβeniθ]; 29 May 1860 – 18 May 1909) was a Spanish virtuoso composer, conductor, and pianist. He is one of the foremost composers of the post-romantic era who also exerted a significant influence on his contemporaries and younger composers. He is best known for his piano works that incorporate Spanish folk music idioms and elements. His compositions, particularly his suite Iberia (1905–1908), are considered masterpieces and have influenced both European classical music and Spanish nationalism. Isaac Albéniz was close to the Generation of '98.

Transcriptions of many of his pieces, such as Asturias (Leyenda), Granada, Sevilla, Cadiz, Córdoba, Cataluña, Mallorca, and Tango in D, are important pieces for classical guitar, though he never composed for the guitar.

Some of Albéniz's personal papers are held in the Library of Catalonia.

== Biography ==
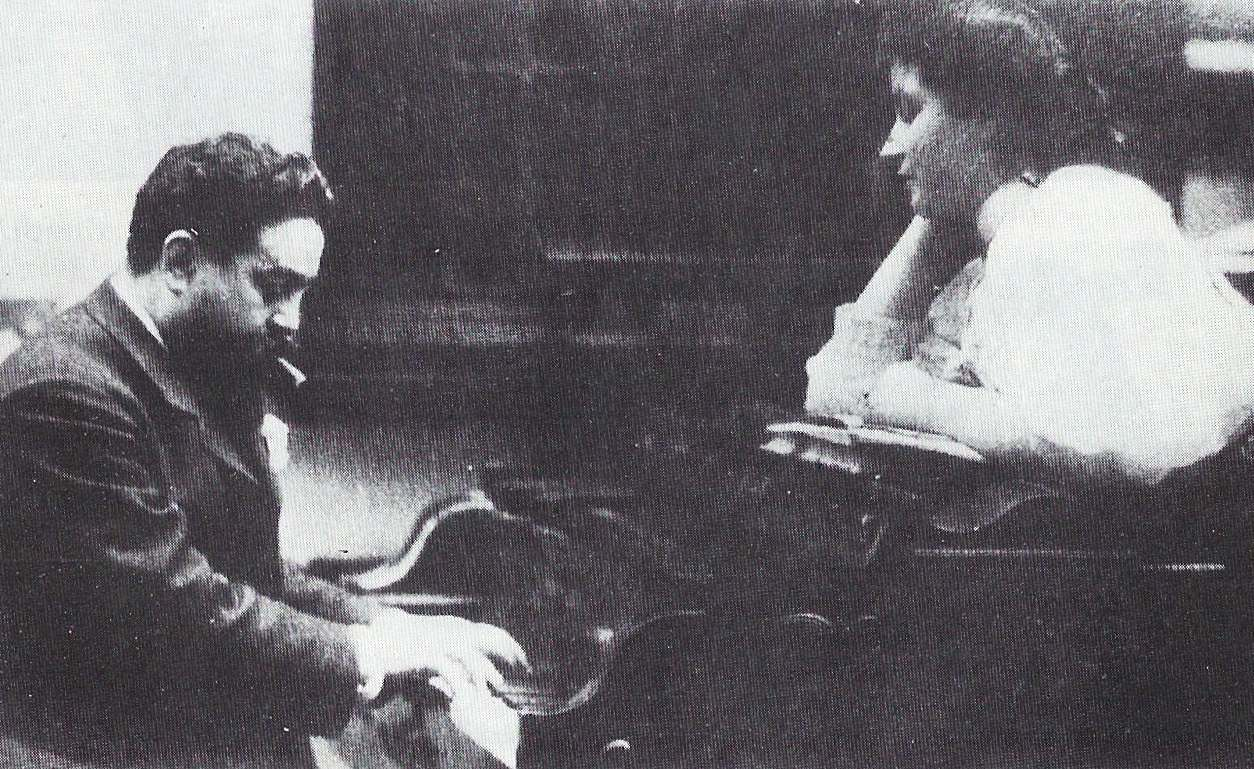
Albéniz (age 45) with his daughter, Laura (age 15)

In 1860, Albéniz was born in Camprodon, province of Girona, to Ángel Albéniz (a customs official) and his wife, Maria de los Dolores Pascual. He was a child prodigy, first performing at the age of 4.

His sister claimed that by the age of three Albéniz knew "his scales and arpeggios, and would play full of expression". The sister and brother duo appeared together on stage at the Teatre Romea in Barcelona when Isaac was just four years old. A "small mountain of pillows was placed on the piano bench so that he could reach the keyboard", not letting his small stature hinder his playing. After their four-hands performance had concluded, the "public threw toys onto the stage, mostly colored balls, and the young pianist immediately started playing with them.”

In 1867, at age 7, after apparently taking lessons from Antoine François Marmontel, Albéniz passed the entrance examination for piano at the Conservatoire de Paris, but he was refused admission because he was believed to be too young.

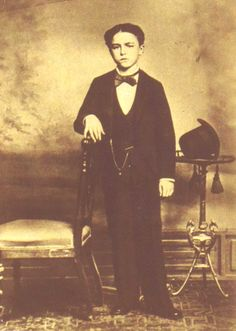
Isaac Albéniz (1872, 12 years old)

Albéniz's concert career began at the age of nine when his father toured both Isaac and his sister, Clementina, throughout northern Spain. A popular myth is that at the age of 12, in 1872, Albéniz stowed away in a ship bound for Buenos Aires. He then found himself in Cuba, then in the United States, giving concerts in New York and San Francisco and then travelled to Liverpool, London and Leipzig.

By age 15, in 1875, Albéniz had already given concerts worldwide. This story is not entirely false, Albéniz did travel the world as a performer; however, he was accompanied by his father, who as a customs agent was required to travel frequently. This can be attested by comparing Isaac's concert dates with his father's travel itinerary.

In 1876, after a short stay at the Leipzig Conservatory, Albéniz went to study at the Royal Conservatory of Brussels after King Alfonso's personal secretary, Guillermo Morphy, obtained him a royal grant. Count Morphy thought highly of Albéniz, who would later dedicate Sevilla to Morphy's wife when it premiered in Paris in January 1886.

In 1880, Albéniz went to Budapest, Hungary, to study with Franz Liszt, only to find out that Liszt was in Weimar, Germany.

In 1883, Albéniz met the teacher and composer Felip Pedrell, who inspired him to write Spanish music such as the Chants d'Espagne. The first movement (Prelude) of that suite, later retitled after the composer's death as Asturias (Leyenda), is now part of the classical guitar repertoire, even though it was originally composed for piano. Many of Albéniz's other compositions were also transcribed for guitar by Francisco Tárrega. At the 1888 Barcelona Universal Exposition, the piano manufacturer Érard sponsored a series of 20 concerts featuring Albéniz's music.

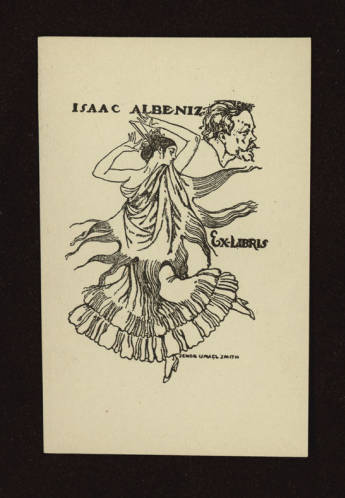
Ex libris Isaac Albéniz by Ismael Smith (around 1921)

Also in 1883, the composer married Rosina Jordana Lagarriga, daughter of the former mayor of the Gràcia district and a former student of Isaac. They had two children who lived into adulthood: Alfonso (1885–1941), who played for FC Barcelona in the early 1900s before embarking on a career as a diplomat, and Laura (1890–1944), who went on to become a renowned illustrator in the arts of drawing and painting. Another child, Enriqueta, died in infancy in 1886. His great-granddaughter is Cécilia Attias, former wife of Nicolas Sarkozy.

The apex of Albéniz's concert career is considered to be 1889 to 1892 when he had concert tours throughout Europe. During the 1890s Albéniz lived in London and Paris. For London he wrote some musical comedies which brought him to the attention of the wealthy Francis Money-Coutts, 5th Baron Latymer. Money-Coutts commissioned and provided him with librettos for the opera Henry Clifford and for a projected trilogy of Arthurian operas. The first of these, Merlin (1898–1902), was thought to have been lost but has recently been reconstructed and performed. Albéniz never completed Lancelot (only the first act is finished, as a vocal and piano score), and he never began Guinevere, the final part.

In 1900, Albéniz started to suffer from Bright's disease and returned to writing piano music.

Between 1905 and 1908, Albéniz composed his final masterpiece, Iberia (1908), a suite of twelve piano "impressions".

On 18 May 1909, at age 48, Albéniz died from his kidney disease in Cambo-les-Bains, in Labourd, south-western France. Only a few weeks before his death, the French Government had bestowed upon Albéniz the Legion of Honour, its highest honour. He is buried at the Montjuïc Cemetery, Barcelona.

== Music ==
=== Early works ===
Albéniz's early works were mostly "salon style" music. His first published composition, Marcha Militar, appeared in 1868. A number of works written before this are now lost. He continued composing in traditional styles ranging from Jean-Philippe Rameau, Johann Sebastian Bach, Ludwig van Beethoven, Frédéric Chopin and Franz Liszt until the mid-1880s. He also wrote at least five zarzuelas, of which all but two are now lost.

Perhaps the best source on the works is Albéniz himself. He is quoted as commenting on his earlier period works as:

There are among them a few things that are not completely worthless. The music is a bit infantile, plain, spirited; but in the end, the people, our Spanish people, are something of all that. I believe that the people are right when they continue to be moved by Córdoba, Mallorca, by the copla of the Sevillanas, by the Serenata, and Granada. In all of them I now note that there is less musical science, less of the grand idea, but more colour, sunlight, flavour of olives. That music of youth, with its little sins and absurdities that almost point out the sentimental affectation ... appears to me like the carvings in the Alhambra, those peculiar arabesques that say nothing with their turns and shapes, but which are like the air, like the sun, like the blackbirds or like the nightingales of its gardens. They are more valuable than all else of Moorish Spain, which though we may not like it, is the true Spain.

=== Middle period ===
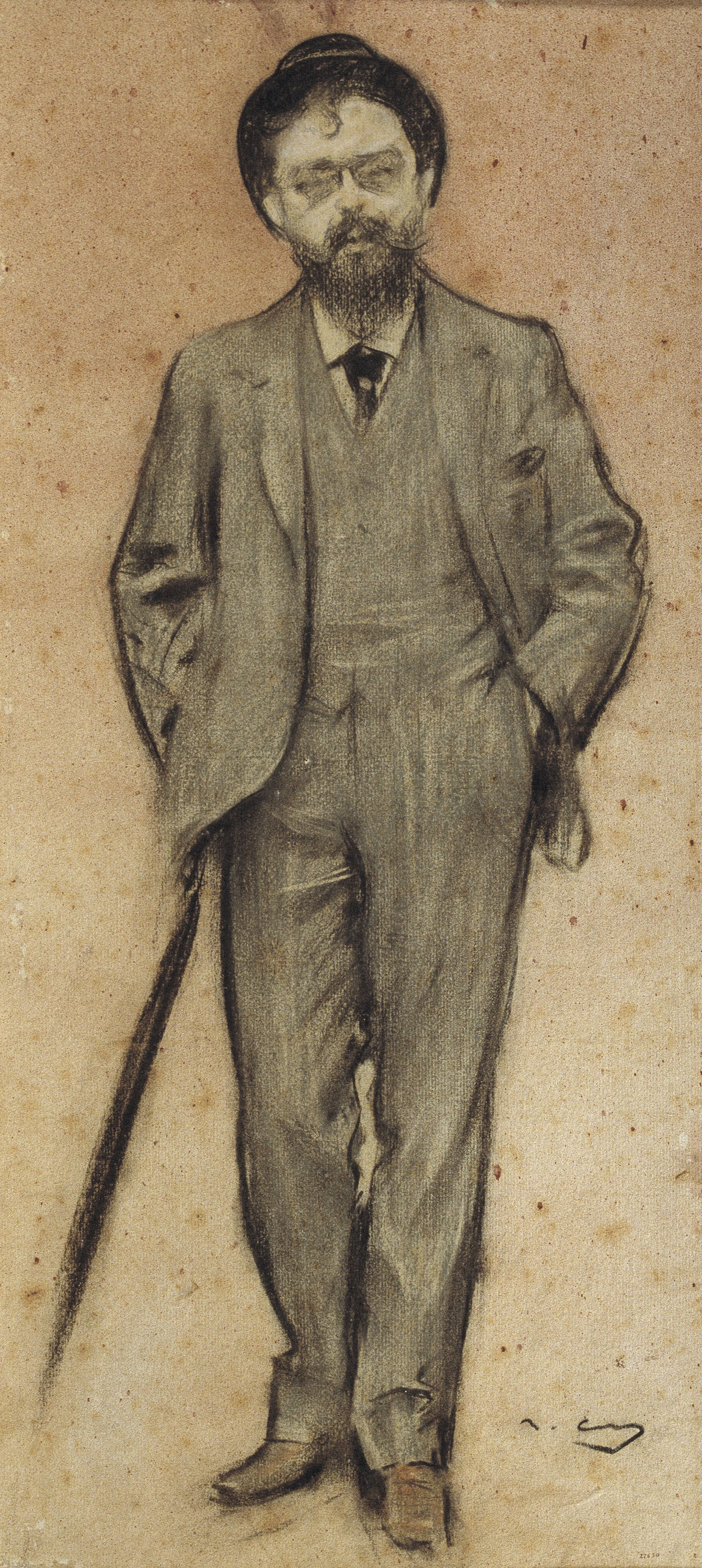
Albéniz, a drawing by Ramon Casas (MNAC)

During the late 1880s, the strong influence of Spanish style is evident in Albéniz's music. In 1883 Albéniz met the teacher and composer Felipe Pedrell. Pedrell was a leading figure in the development of nationalist Spanish music. In his book The Music of Spain, Gilbert Chase describes Pedrell's influence on Albéniz: "What Albéniz derived from Pedrell was above all a spiritual orientation, the realization of the wonderful values inherent in Spanish music." Felipe Pedrell inspired Albéniz to write Spanish music such as the Suite española, Op. 47, noted for its delicate, intricate melody and abrupt dynamic changes.

In addition to the Spanish spirit infused in Albéniz's music, he incorporated other qualities as well. In her biography of Albéniz, Pola Baytelman discerns four characteristics of the music from the middle period as follows:

1. The dance rhythms of Spain, of which there are a wide variety. 2. The use of cante jondo, which means deep or profound singing. It is the most serious and moving variety of flamenco or Spanish gypsy song, often dealing with themes of death, anguish, or religion. 3. The use of exotic scales also associated with flamenco music. The Phrygian mode is the most prominent in Albéniz's music, although he also used the Aeolian and Mixolydian modes as well as the whole-tone scale. 4. The transfer of guitar idioms into piano writing.

Following his marriage, Albéniz settled in Madrid, Spain, and produced a substantial quantity of music in a relatively short period. By 1886 he had written over 50 piano pieces. Albéniz biographer Walter A. Clark says that pieces from this period received enthusiastic reception in the composer's many concerts. Chase describes music from this period,

Taking the guitar as his instrumental model, and drawing his inspiration largely from the peculiar traits of Andalusian folk music—but without using actual folk themes—Albéniz achieves a stylization of Spanish traditional idioms that while thoroughly artistic, gives a captivating impression of spontaneous improvisation... Córdoba is the piece that best represents the style of Albéniz in this period, with its hauntingly beautiful melody, set against the acrid dissonances of the plucked accompaniment imitating the notes of the Moorish guzlas. Here is the heady scent of jasmines amid the swaying palm trees, the dream fantasy of an Andalusian "Arabian Nights" in which Albéniz loved to let his imagination dwell.

=== Later period ===
While Albéniz's crowning achievement, Iberia, was written in the last years of his life in France, many of its preceding works are well-known and of great interest. The five pieces in Chants d'Espagne (Songs of Spain, published in 1892) are a solid example of the compositional ideas he was exploring in the "middle period" of his life. The suite shows what Albéniz biographer Walter Aaron Clark describes as the "first flowering of his unique creative genius", and the beginnings of compositional exploration that became the hallmark of his later works. This period also includes his operatic works—Merlin, Henry Clifford, and Pepita Jiménez. His orchestral works of this period include Spanish Rhapsody (1887) and Catalonia (1899), dedicated to Ramon Casas, who had painted his full-length portrait in 1894.

=== Operas ===
- The Magic Opal (1892–1893)
- Pepita Jiménez (January 1895)
- Henry Clifford (May 1895)
- Merlin (1897–1902)
- Lancelot (1902–1903, incomplete)
- Guinevere (unrealized)

== Impact and legacy ==
As one of the leading composers of his era, Albéniz's influences on both contemporary composers and on the future of Spanish music are profound. His death was a great loss for Spanish music. As a result of his extended stay in France and the friendship he formed with numerous composers there, his composition technique and harmonic language influenced aspiring younger composers such as Claude Debussy, Maria Luisa Ponsa, and Maurice Ravel. Debussy had stated that in the twelve Piano pieces of Iberia, it was the best he had to offer. His activities as conductor, performer and composer significantly raised the profile of Spanish music abroad and encouraged Spanish music and musicians in his own country.

Albéniz's works have become an important part of the repertoire of the classical guitar, many of which have been transcribed by Francisco Tárrega, Miguel Llobet and others. Asturias (Leyenda) in particular is heard most often on the guitar, as are Granada, Sevilla, Cadiz, Cataluña, Córdoba, Mallorca, and Tango in D. Gordon Crosskey and Cuban-born guitarist Manuel Barrueco have both made solo guitar arrangements of all the eight movements in Suite española. Selections from Iberia have rarely been attempted on solo guitar but have been very effectively performed by guitar ensembles, such as the performance by John Williams and Julian Bream of Iberia's opening "Evocation". The Doors incorporated "Asturias" into their song "Spanish Caravan"; also, Iron Maiden's "To Tame a Land" uses the introduction of the piece for the song bridge. More recently, a guitar version of Granada functions as something of a love theme in Woody Allen's 2008 film Vicky Cristina Barcelona.

A film about his life, Albéniz, was made in 1947. It was produced in Argentina.

The theme from Asturias was incorporated or adapted in several soundtracks including the 2008 horror film Mirrors, composed by Javier Navarrete, and the Netflix TV show Godless, composed by Carlos Rafael Rivera.

In 1997 the Fundación Isaac Albéniz was founded to promote Spanish music and musicians and to act as a research centre for Albéniz and Spanish music in general.

== References and sources ==
Sources

- Barulich, Frances (2001). "Albéniz, Isaac". Grove Music Online. Oxford Music Online. doi:10.1093/gmo/9781561592630.article.00421. ISBN 9781561592630.
- Baytelman, Pola (1993). Isaac Albéniz: Chronological List and Thematic Catalog of His Piano Works. Detroit Studies in Music Bibliography, No. 72. Harmonie Park Press. ISBN 978-0-89990-067-4 – via Internet Archive.
- Chase, Gilbert (1959). The Music of Spain. New York: Dover Publications. ISBN 0-486-20549-5 – via Internet Archive.
- Clark, Walter Aaron (2002). Isaac Albéniz: Portrait of a Romantic (revised ed.). New York: Oxford University Press. ISBN 978-0-19-925052-3.
- Montoya, Leydy (17 April 2019). "Isaac Albéniz". historia-biografia.com.
