= Suite Española No. 1 =

1887 piano suite by Isaac Albéniz

Suite española Op. 47 – 1. Granada (Serenata)
Performed on a piano by Guillermo Gonzalez
Courtesy of NAXOS

Suite Española, Op. 47 – 5. Asturias (Leyenda)
Performed on a guitar by Gordon Rowland.

Isaac Albéniz’s Suite española, Op. 47, is a suite for solo piano. It is mainly composed of works written in 1886 which were grouped together in 1887, in honour of the Queen of Spain. Like many of Albeniz's works for the piano, these pieces depict different regions and musical styles in Spain.

== Origins of the suite ==
The work originally consisted of four pieces: Granada, Cataluña, Sevilla and Cuba and was published in Madrid by Zozaya. The remaining four movements, Cádiz, Asturias, Aragón and Castilla, had been published in other editions and were added to the original four. The first appearance of the eight movement suite was in 1901 published by Dotesio. The editor Hofmeister republished the Suite española in 1912, after Albéniz's death, with the four extra movements.

In fact, Asturias and Castilla were originally published as part of Chants D'Espagne, Op. 232, under the names "Prélude" and "Seguidillas", respectively. Cádiz, in turn, was originally Célèbre Sérénade Espagnole, Op. 181. Finally, Aragón was the Jota Aragonesa from Deux Danses Espagnoles, Op. 164.

As such, the four additional pieces do not exactly reflect the geographical region to which they refer. A clear example of this is Asturias (Leyenda), whose Andalusian Flamenco rhythms have little to do with the Atlantic region of Asturias. Opus 47, the number assigned by Hofmeister, does not have any chronological relation to any of Albéniz's other works, since the opus numbers of Albéniz's compositions were randomly assigned by publishers and Albéniz himself. Despite the spurious nature of the Suite española, however, it has become one of the most performed of Albéniz's piano works, a favorite of both pianists and audiences.

== The music ==
In these works, the first title refers to the geographical region portrayed, and the title in parentheses is the musical form or dance from that region. From Granada in Andalusia there is a Serenata, from Catalonia a Curranda or Courante, from Sevilla a Sevillanas, from Cuba (which was still part of Spain in the 1880s) a Notturno in the style of a habanera, from Cádiz a Canción, from Asturias a Leyenda, from Aragon a Fantasia in the style of a jota, and from Castile a seguidillas. Cádiz (Canción) and Asturias (Leyenda) are both geographically inaccurate.

== Pieces ==
In the works constituting the Suite española, the first title makes reference to the region that each piece represents, and the subtitle in brackets indicates the musical form of the dance of the region.

1. Granada (Serenade)
2. Cataluña (Courante)
3. Sevilla (Sevillanas)
4. Cádiz (Canción)
5. Asturias (Leyenda)
6. Aragón (Fantasía)
7. Castilla (Seguidillas)
8. Cuba (Nocturno)

The suite has been orchestrated by other hands, including a well-known version by Rafael Frühbeck de Burgos. Arrangements of individual works and indeed the entire suite are often played in concert by classical guitarists. In fact, "Granada", "Sevilla", "Cádiz" and "Asturias" are more often heard on guitar than in their original piano versions; all four have been staples of the guitar literature since the early 20th century. "Cataluña" and "Cuba" became solo guitar staples in the 1980s. The remaining pieces, "Aragón" and "Castilla," have been transcribed for guitar solo but are more often heard in multiple-guitar transcriptions.
