= Chants d'Espagne =

Suite of piano pieces by Isaac Albéniz

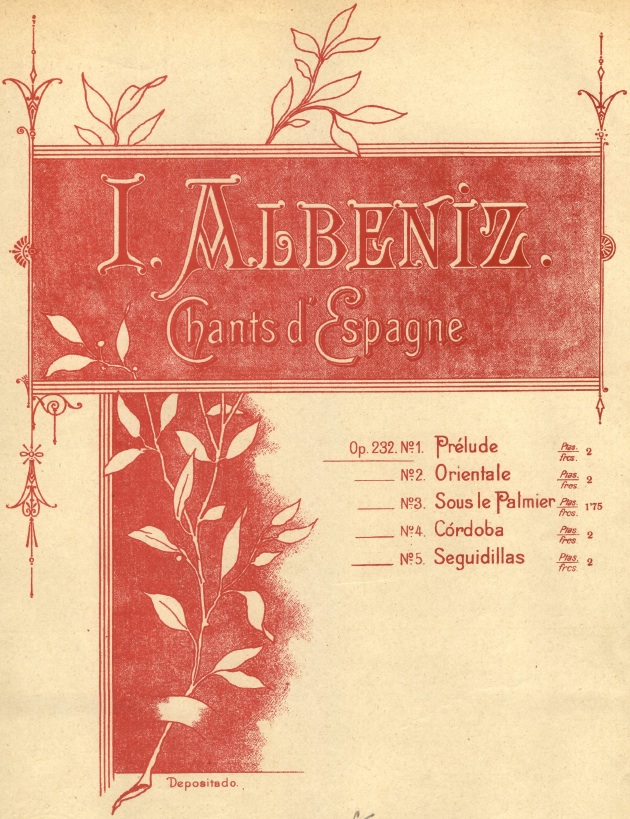
Cover of the score of Chants d'Espagne (1898)

Chants d'Espagne, Op. 232, (Spanish: Cantos de España, English: Songs of Spain) is a suite of originally three, later five pieces for the piano by Isaac Albéniz. Prélude (later known as Asturias (Leyenda)), Orientale and Sous le palmier were published in 1892, and Córdoba and Seguidillas were added in the 1898 edition. According to Günter Schulze, "Many...[of the works] have the flavor of the flamenco so beloved of Albéniz."[1]

Historically this suite, and the first three pieces, are usually referred to by their French names, but some recordings give the titles in Spanish.

== Premières and impact ==
The suite was premiered in Paris on March 28, 1892, by Albéniz in a private concert for piano and cello, accompanied by members of the Opéra National de Paris orchestra. Several days later the first publication of the work in the repertoire was announced by the composer's publisher.

== The music ==
=== 1. Prélude ===
Guitar version of "Asturias" performed by Sharon Isbin.

The Prélude (Spanish: Preludio) is also known under the titles Asturias (Leyenda), titles given to it when it was incorporated into an extended version of Albéniz's Suite española, two years after the composer's death. Francisco Tárrega arranged the piece for guitar in its most recognizable key, E minor; it was subsequently made popular by Andrés Segovia. The theme, or versions of it, is often used in film music and popular music.

Albéniz's biographer, Walter Aaron Clark, describes the piece as "pure Andalusian flamenco" with a main theme that mimics the guitar technique of alternating the thumb and fingers of the right hand, playing a pedal-note open string with the index finger and a bass melody with the thumb. The theme itself suggests the rhythm of the bulería — a song from the flamenco repertoire. The ‘marcato’/'staccato’ markings suggest both guitar sounds and the footwork of a flamenco dancer. The piece sounds as though it is written in the Phrygian mode which is typical of bulerías. The second section is a reminiscent of a copla — a sung verse following a specific form. Clark states that it is written in typical Albéniz form as it is "presented monophonically but doubled at the fifteenth for more fullness of sound. The music alters between a solo and accompaniment that is typical of flamenco. The short middle section of the piece is written in the style of a malagueña — another flamenco style piece. The malagueña borrows two motives from the previous copla and builds on them. The piece returns to its first theme until a slow "hymn-like" passage ends the piece.

=== 2. Orientale ===
This piece (Spanish: Oriental) too is based on the songs and dances of Andalusia in spite of its Asian name. Opening with a dissonant clash of chords, the Phrygian mode is established quickly. It is melancholic and reflective. The main theme is also based on an octosyllabic copla.

=== 3. Sous le palmier ===
Sous le palmier (Spanish: Bajo la palmera = Under the Palm Tree), also known as Danse espagnole (Spanish Dance). As the piece has two names, it also has two feelings as it progresses. The gentle swaying of the palm trees coincides with the swaying of the Gypsy tango. When Ericourt describes how the rhythm should be played in these pieces, he writes,

"First, the rhythm is to be steady, with even beats throughout, but at the same time, give a supple and relaxed, even languid or voluptuous impression. The 'marcato' indication at the beginning means exactness, rather than a rigidity of rhythm. The music must flow uninterruptedly."

Ericourt also emphasizes the importance of moderation in expression: "Any exaggeration, tonal or otherwise, could easily bring vulgarity to this composition."

At measure 17, the music moves to the parallel minor, a move seen in other pieces by Albéniz. Clark describes the power the shift creates when he writes, "(it) expresses a sadness that we can fully understand only if we recall the depression that underlay his outward sanguinity." This sadness is touched on sparingly in the biographical works on Albéniz.

=== 4. Córdoba ===
Córdoba celebrates one of Albéniz's favorite cities. In the heart of Andalusia, the city of Córdoba is home to Spain's famous "great Mosque". The city is rich in history, both Christian and Moorish, and Albéniz captures the mood and feel of both in Córdoba. Clark states that the name of the piece may have been inspired by Albéniz's namesake, St. Isaac of Córdoba, who died defending his faith in this southern Andalusian city.

The piece begins with the sound of tolling church bells. The sound of a hymn in dorian mode plays in a faux bourdon style, rhythmically ambiguous so as to resemble liturgical singing. The first section ends in contrasting character, reminiscent of a gusla playing a serenade with a Moorish sound. The second section sounds of flamenco dancers and Spanish folk song rhythms as it mounts to a moving climax. There is a repeat of the first section and then a brief coda. Ericourt states, "In view of the multifaceted nature of this piece, it would not be improper to consider this evocative composition a tone poem for the piano."

=== 5. Seguidillas ===
The final piece of the collection is Seguidillas. A seguidilla is a popular song or dance form composed from four to seven verses. The form is explained as,

"based on strong flamenco rhythms. Its seven "verses" are tied together by the similarity of the first three verses, the fact that the 4th and 5th verses begin in the same way as the first three, and that the 6th is based on their endings; the 7th verse is a free mixture of the beginning and ending materials just mentioned. The seven verses are enclosed by a four-bar introduction, which set the rhythm, and a 13-bar Coda which provides a brilliant ending."

Exact rhythm is paramount in the performance of this piece to be true to the typical Spanish dance form.

This movement was posthumously added to the Suite Española Nº 1, Op. 47 under the name Castilla, just as Prélude became Asturias in the same suite.

== Summary ==
Chants d'Espagne demonstrates new forms and new harmonies that Albéniz had not shown previously. Clark writes, "The suite represents the furthest advance in Albéniz's Spanish style to date in its seriousness, harmonic richness, and formal variety." It was after the composing this suite that Albéniz redirected his compositional energy toward musical drama, opera and theatre.

== Bibliography ==
- Walter Aaron Clark, Isaac Albéniz: A Guide to Research, Garland Publishing Inc. New York & London, 1998.
- Walter Aaron Clark, Isaac Albéniz: Portrait of a Romantic, Oxford University Press, New York 1999.
- Daniel Ericourt and Robert. P. Erickson, MasterClasses in Spanish Piano Music, Hinshaw Music, Chapel Hill North Carolina, 1984.
