= Miguel Llobet =

Spanish guitarist (1878–1938)

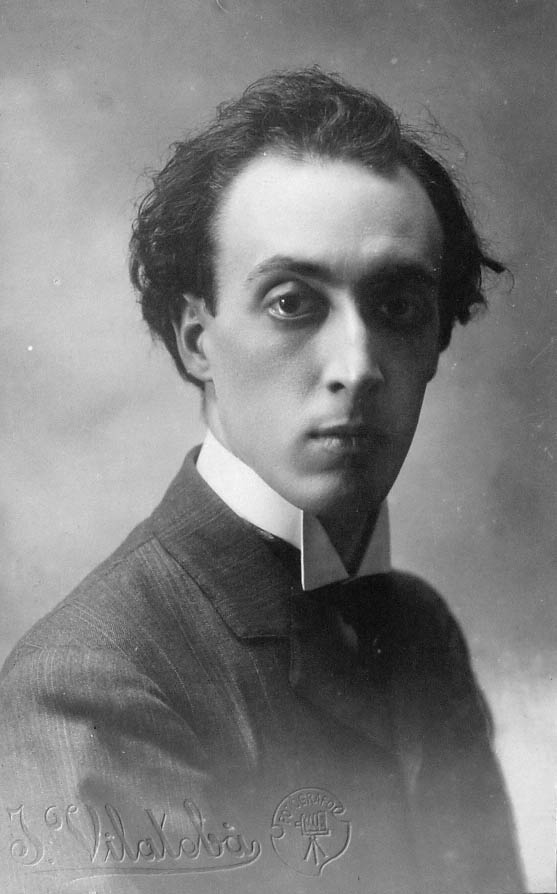
- Portrait of Llobet in 1916

Background information
- Born: 18 October 1878; Barcelona, Spain
- Died: 22 February 1938 (aged 59) Barcelona, Spain
- Genre: Classical music
- Instrument: Classical Guitar
- Labels: Chanterelle Verlag, Odeon-Parlophone, Decca

Miguel Llobet Solés (18 October 1878 – 22 February 1938) was a Spanish classical guitarist, born in Barcelona, Spain. Llobet was a renowned virtuoso who toured Europe and America extensively. He made well known arrangements of Catalan folk songs for the solo guitar, made famous arrangements for the guitar of the piano compositions of Isaac Albéniz, arrangements immortalized by Andrés Segovia, and was also the composer of original works.

== Biography ==
Some details of Llobet's biography are confused and contradictory. The son of a gilder, he was baptized in the month of his birth in the church of Sant Just i Pastor on the Carrer de la Palma de Sant Just, the street where he spent his boyhood, just a few streets from the Carrer Gignàs, which (from 1884 through 1885) was the residence of his eventual teacher Francisco Tárrega. He was trained as an artist, revealing a talent for painting, and continued to paint throughout his life. His earliest musical training was on the violin and the piano. Later he received a guitar as a gift from an uncle. In December 1889, Llobet heard Antonio Jiménez Manjón (1866–1919) give a guitar recital at the Teatre Catalunya in Barcelona, and was inspired to seek instruction on the guitar from Magí Alegre.

Llobet first met, and played for, the great guitar pedagogue Francisco Tárrega in October 1892. Two years later he began to study with him at the Municipal Conservatory of Music in Barcelona. By his own account, his studies with Tárrega do not seem to have been based on any particular method, rather Llobet would observe Tárrega play and then experiment with his techniques at home. "Così, più che impararla, io sperimentavo la mia tecnica sulla chitarra". ("In this way, more than by learning it, I experimented with my guitar technique.")

He began giving private concerts for intimate gatherings in 1898. Around that time he met Concepción Gómez de Jacoby, Tárrega’s patron, who also became his own patron, helping him to launch an international career. Prat, 1934, p. 184-5, recounts that after meeting Llobet, Concepción took him to Málaga, and in 1900 to Paris, bringing him out of the Barcelona area for the first time and allowing him to begin an international concert career. His first public concert took place in 1901 at the Conservatory of València. During that same year, he also performed at conservatories in Seville and Málaga, where he was awarded the honorary title of Professor. He played at the Teatro de la Comedia in 1902 and before the Spanish royal family in Madrid in 1903.

In 1904 in Paris Llobet's first concert outside Spain was presented by Ricardo Viñes, the noted pianist. It was at this time that he first came into contact with the avant garde. Paris was apparently kind to Llobet, as he returned to live there in 1905, performing at such prestigious venues as the Schola Cantorum, La Trompette and the Société Nationale de Musique. According to Ronald Purcell, he resided there until 1910. In the biographical sketch given by Bruno Tonazzi, Llobet returned to Paris in 1910 but according to Purcell he probably temporarily relocated to Buenos Aires in that year. From there he performed throughout South and Central America and the Caribbean in a series of tours largely arranged by Domingo Prat, (author of the Diccionario de Guitarristas 1933), Juan Anido (father of María Luisa Anido) and Ruiz Romero of the publishing house Romero y Fernandez. In 1912, Llobet gave his first concerts in the United States, performing in Boston, Philadelphia and New York City. He then returned to Paris.

In the following years, he continued to perform throughout Europe, particularly in Belgium and the Netherlands. During 1913 and 1914 he performed throughout Germany. According to Purcell, "At the outbreak of World War I, Llobet returned to Buenos Aires," and continued to make trips throughout the Americas. while Tonazzi states that at the outbreak of the First World War he returned to his native land. Llobet's concert itinerary seems to have been dominated by performances in the Americas at that time, lending some support to Purcell's claims, however Purcell also implies that Llobet was in Spain about 1915, where he taught his most important pupil, Andrés Segovia.

Segovia's autobiography, written at the height of his career, depicts himself as being self-taught - there are admissions of his seeking out Llobet's advice for a short time, but Segovia is quite clear about the lack of any real influence on his playing. At the age of 22, Segovia was still youthful enough to have received valuable instruction. Purcell states that "At the age of twenty-two (Segovia) pursued what he considered the only direct contact to Tárrega, Llobet, for refinement of his technique and especially for the music that both he and Tárrega had written and transcribed for the guitar..." and that "Segovia, whose performance style and technique reveals [sic] the principles of Tárrega, was basically influenced by Llobet....This stylistic influence can be heard when comparing Llobet's Parlophone Electric recordings (Chanterelle Historical Recordings CHR 001) with Segovia's Angel recordings, ZB 3896".

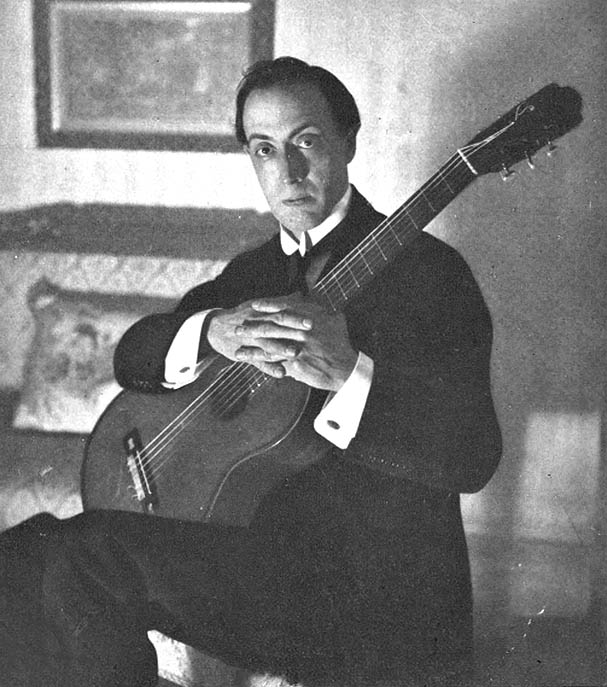
Llobet photographed in 1918

In 1915, Llobet made one attempt at recording at the Victor studios in New York, but the two sides he recorded, Manuelito and Sueño, were rejected. The prominent guitarist Vahdah Olcott-Bickford, who was living in New York at the time, writes that "he tried to make a recording at the Bell Lab in New Brunswick, New Jersey, but was dissatisfied with the sound." It is also known that he toured the East Coast of the United States in 1912, 1914 and 1917.

In 1920-1921, Llobet played in Spain and toured throughout Germany, performing in Munich, Leipzig, Dresden, Cologne and Stuttgart. In 1922 he was in Vienna for the first time. When in Vienna, Llobet was frequently a guest in the house of Luise Walker's parents. In 1924, he again toured throughout Germany and Austria, and he concertized in the Americas in 1925. He returned again to the Americas in 1930 to perform for the Spanish Arts Festival, under the auspices of the Library of Congress. The violinist Antonio Bossa had recommended him, and he was contracted to play six solos, and to arrange and perform Manuel de Falla's Siete Canciones Españolas with soprano Nina Kochitz.

In 1923, he began to teach María Luisa Anido (1907–1997) in Buenos Aires. By 1925, the two were performing duets and, according to Purcell, about 1930 recorded some of Llobet's duet arrangements on the Odeon-Parlophone label distributed by Decca. These recordings followed a solo series recorded by Llobet on the Parlophon/Electric series out of Barcelona". The solo recordings, among the first released of the classical guitar, are supposed to have been recorded around 1925, but are from two different sources: Argentina/Odeon recording sessions as well as the earlier Barcelona/Parlophon recording. In response to an inquiry, Purcell stated that "Llobet did not care for the acoustic recording results in 1915 and only recorded electronically.... His recordings were recorded in 1925 and later with Maria Anido". It may be noted that electronic recording was developed by Bell Labs under its Western Electrical branch, and was leased to recording companies under the name of "Westrex Electrical Recording System" beginning in 1925. Initially only Victor and Columbia records leased it, with an up-front payment of $50,000 each. Under the general management of Louis Sterling, Columbia acquired a number of European, Asian, and U.S. recording companies in 1925. Sterling soon after arranged for a holding company to combine Columbia and the Carl Lindstrom group, which included Parlphone and Odeon, the companies that seem to be the ones under which Llobet's recordings were released.

Llobet toured Europe again in 1930-1931, performing in London, Berlin, Hamburg, Munich, Vienna, Budapest and Bologna among others. On hearing him in Berlin Paul Hindemith declared an intent to compose for the guitar, but did not follow this through - Hindemith's only work for guitar, the Rondo for Three Guitars, had been written in 1925.

From 1932 to 1934, Llobet taught the young Cuban virtuoso José Rey de la Torre at his home in Barcelona. He does not appear to have performed much at this time, but maintained his artistic contacts. Rey writes: "At the time I arrived in Barcelona in 1932, he had almost retired from the concert stage. During the three years that I spent there he left town only once for a month's tour of Scandinavia."

Llobet seems to have enjoyed a somewhat reclusive retirement from the concert stage, Rey de la Torre who, as Llobet's pupil, may well have been his most frequent visitor, writes that "Llobet did not have many visitors..." He did seem to go out to concerts frequently, walking with his wife, to the Palau close to his home, and met a few influential artists at his large apartment at Via Layetana No. 46 in Barcelona: Emilio Pujol was a frequent guest and Manuel de Falla is known to have visited whenever in that city.

The statement by Philip J. Bone in The Guitar and Mandolin that Llobet "was killed in 1937, in an air raid in Barcelona during the Spanish Civil War" (Bone 1954) has been tacitly contradicted by all reliable sources. However, the emotional devastation over the siege of Barcelona may have begun his downward spiral of health. On 22 February 1938, Llobet died of pleurisy in Barcelona.

His complete works, edited by Professor Ron Purcell, were published by Chanterelle Verlag. Chanterelle, now under the ownership of Musicverlag Zimmermann, is in the process of publishing new Urtext editions of the complete catalog under the editorship of Stefano Grondona. These new and more definitive editions are based on autograph manuscripts found in the Miguel Llobet Collection of the Museu de la Música in Barcelona.

== Llobet's guitars ==
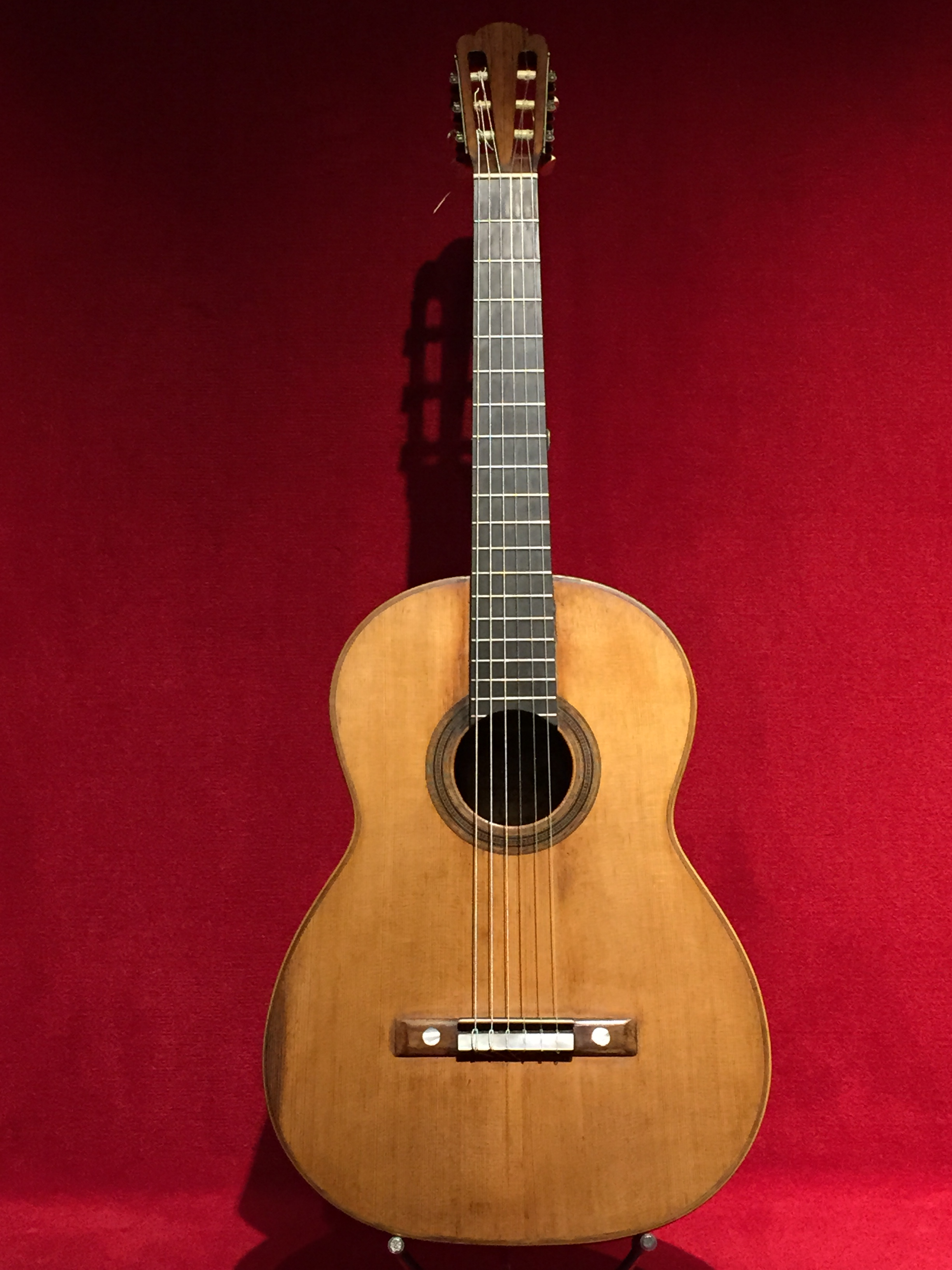
1859 guitar "MDMB 626" made by Antonio de Torres, played by Miguel Llobet, exhibited at the Museu de la Música de Barcelona

Llobet's favorite guitar was an Antonio de Torres made in 1859; he refused to have a split in the back repaired for fear that it would affect the exquisite tone. Llobet is known to have toured with Torres guitars FE 09 and FE 13.

Other guitars played by Llobet were a 1880 Julian Llorente, repaired by Manuel Ramírez, and a Hermann Hauser I guitar from 1913.

== List of works ==
=== Original compositions ===
- Romanza
- Estudio en mi mayor
- Estudio Capricho en re mayor
- Mazurka
- Variaciones sobre un Tema de Sor
- Scherzo-Vals
- Prélude Original
- Preludio en re mayor
- Respuesta-Impromptu
- Preludio en la mayor
- Preludio en mi mayor
- Estilo

=== Arrangements of folksongs ===
These pieces are often referred to as Llobet's "Canciones populares Catalanas". Probably the two most famous of them are 'El testament d'Amèlia' and 'El Noi de la Mare'.

- Plany (Lament)
- La filla del marxant (The Merchant's Daughter)
- El testament d'Amèlia (Amèlia's Will)
- Cançó del lladre (Song of the Thief)
- Lo rossinyol (The Nightingale)
- Lo fill del rei (The King's Son)
- L'hereu Riera (Heir Riera)
- El mestre (The Teacher)
- La filadora (The Spinner Woman)
- La presó de Lleida (Lleida Prison)
- La Nit de Nadal (Christmas Eve)
- La pastoreta (The Little Shepherd Girl)
- El noi de la Mare (The Mother's Child (Our Lady's Child))
- Leonesa (From Leon)
- Estilos populares Argentinos nos. 1 & 2.

==== Guitar solos ====
- Isaac Albéniz: Cádiz, Oriental, Sevilla, Torre Bermeja y Córdoba (1929)
- Enrique Granados: Danzas Españolas Nos. 5, 7 & 10, Dedicatoria, La Maja de Goya.
- Joaquín "Quinito" Valverde: Clavelitos.

==== Guitar duets ====
- Isaac Albéniz: Rumores de la Caleta, Castilla, Bajo la Palmera, Evocación
- Louis-Claude Daquin: "Le Cou Cou"
- Enrique Granados: Danzas Españolas Nos. 6 & 11
- Eduardo López-Chávarri: Leyenda del Castillo Moro
- Felix Mendelssohn: Songs Without Words Nos. 20 & 25
- Wolfgang Amadeus Mozart: Synphony No. 39: Minuet
- Pyotr Ilyich Tchaikovsky: Humoresque, Op. 10, No. 2

=== Pieces composed for Miguel Llobet ===
- Manuel de Falla: Homenaje pour le tombeau de Claude Debussy
- Eduardo López-Chávarri: Sonata I.

== Discography ==
- Miguel Llobet - Historical Recordings 1925-1929 (Chanterelle Verlag, CHR001)

Track Listing
- Julián Aguirre: Huella*
- Isaac Albéniz: Evocación*
- Johann Sebastian Bach: Sarabande [2 takes].
- Napoléon Coste: Etude op.38 no.23 [2 takes].
- Miguel Llobet: El Testament d'Amelia, La Filla del Marxant, Plany, El Mestre.
- Felix Mendelssohn: May Breezes*.
- Manuel M. Ponce: 2 Canciones Mejicanas.
- Pedro M. Quijano;: Estilo Popular Criollo.
- Fernando Sor : Andantino op.2 no.3, Estudio op.35 no.2, Minueto op.11, no.12.
- Rogelio del Villar: Canción Popular Leonesa [Canción del Ladrón]
(* Duetts with María Luisa Anido).

== Sources ==
- Appleby, Wilfrid M.: "Guitar Music. The Artistry of Miguel Llobet (1878–1938)", Guitar News 67 (September – October 1962), p. 14-15.
- "Bell Laboratories and the Development of Electrical Recording", http://www.stokowski.org/Development_of_Electrical_Recording.htm
- Bone, Philip James: The Guitar and Mandolin. Biographies of Celebrated Players and Composers (London: Schott & Co., 1914; 2nd edition 1954; reprint 1972).
- Delcamp, Jean-François (ed.): Miguel Lllobet Solés (1878–1938), Biography and Work for Guitar. www.delcamp.net (2009)
- "Francisco Tárrega Segun …", in: Guitarra (Havana) 2, no. 3 (December 1941), p. 16-17.
- García, Héctor: Letter from Miami to Robert Phillips, Lakeland, 9 February 2002
- "La Musica per Chitarra nel Secolo XX. IX: I Chitarristi-Compositori.", in: Il Fronimo no. 46 (January 1984), p. 28-33.
- "La Rinascita della Chitarra", in: Il Fronimo, no. 1 (October 1972), p. 10-12.
- Hermann Hauser Official Website: "Miguel Llobet 1878-1938", http://www.hauserguitars.de/english/docs/geschichte/geschichte_llobet.htm, 2004.
- Herrera, F.: "Du nouveau du côte de jeux interdits: Quelques documents qui parlent d'eux-mêmes”, in: Guitarre, no. 38 (1991), p. 20.
- Jones, Allen Clive: "The Judgement of Paris: Part 5 – Pujol's Article in Lavignac's Encyclopedia", in: Classical Guitar 17, no. 4 (December 1998), p. 24, 26-28.
- "Licensing the Western Electric Electrical Recording System to Victor and Columbia", http://www.stokowski.org/Licensing_Westrex_System_to_Victor_Columbia.htm
- Llobet, Miguel: "Francisco Tárrega", in: Revista Musical Catalana 7, no. 73 (1910), p. 9-10.
- Llobet, Miguel. Guitar Works, vol. 1: 11 Original Compositions, edited by Ronald Purcell (Heidelberg: Chanterelle Verlag, 1989).
- Llobet, Miguel. Guitar Works, vol. 2: 16 Folksong Settings, edited by Ronald Purcell (Heidelberg: Chanterelle Verlag, 1989).
- Llobet, Miguel. Guitar Works, vol. 3: 10 Famous Transcriptions, edited by Ronald Purcell (Heidelberg: Chanterelle Verlag, 1989).
- Llobet, Miguel. Guitar Works, vol. 4: 12 Famous Guitar Duos, edited by Ronald Purcell (Heidelberg: Chanterelle Verlag, 1989).
- Mangado Artigas, Josep Maria: La Guitarra en Cataluña, 1769-1939 (Edición del Autor, 2004) (in Spanish).
- Marsh, William Sewall: "Some Spanish and Spanish-American Guitarists", in: Crescendo 24, no. 6 (February 1932), p. 3-4.
- "Miguel Soles Llobet", in: Guitarra 1, no. 2 (May–June 1963), p. 13-15.
- Ophee, Matanya: "The Promotion of Francisco Tárrega – a Case History", in: Soundboard 8, no. 3 (August 1981), p. 152-158.
- "The Promotion of Francisco Tárrega – a Case History", in: Soundboard 8, no. 4 (November 1981), p. 256-261.
- Pahissa, Jaime: Vida y obra de Manuel de Falla (Buenos Aires: Ricordi Americana, 1947).
- Phillips, Robert: "Barcelona, Cradle of the Modern Classical Guitar: The Llobet Archive Rediscovered", in: Soundboard 28, no. 4 (Spring 2002), p. 39-41.
- Phillips, Robert: "Barcelona Redux", in: Soundboard 34, no. 1 (2008), p. 23-24.
- Phillips, Robert: The Influence of Miguel Llobet on the Pedagogy, Repertoire and Stature of the Guitar in the Twentieth Century (doctoral dissertation, 2002), OCLC 51796355.
- Picciano, Stefano: Miguel Llobet. La biografia (Bologna: Ut Orpheus, 2015) (in Italian); ISBN 978-88-8109-493-6.
- Prat, Domingo: Diccionario biográfico–bibliográfico—histórico: crítico de guitarras (instrumentos afines), guitarristas (profesores–compositores–concertistas–lahudistas–amateurs), guitarreros (luthiers). Danzas y cantos—terminología (Buenos Aires: Romero y Fernández [1934].
- Pujol, Emilio: Tárrega: Ensayo Biográfico (Valencia: Artes Graf, Soler, 1978).
- Purcell, Ronald: liner notes for Miguel Llobet, the Guitar Recordings 1925-1929 (Chanterelle Historical Recordings CHR 001, 1993).
- Riera, Juan: Miguel Llobet, Composer and Guitarist (1878-1938) (translated by Mrs. A. Korwin-Rodziszewski), in: Guitar News, 27 (October–November 1955), p. 7-8.
- Rey de la Torre, José: "Miguel Llobet, El Mestre", in: Guitar Review, no. 60 (Winter 1985), p. 22-32.
- Roberts, John: "Miguel Llobet", in: Guitar 1, no. 5 (December 1972).
- "Some Spanish and Spanish-American Guitarists", in: Crescendo 24 (September 1932), p. 3-4.
- Spalding, Walter: "Falla's 'Homenaje pour le Tombeau de Claude Debussy'. A Master Lesson with Rey de la Torre, Taped in the Form of a Conversation with Walter Spalding, September '76", in: Chelys 1, no. 5 (1977)p. 37-41.
- Spalding, Walter: "Reminiscences of Llobet. A Conversational Fragment with Rey de la Torre", in: Chelys 1, no. 5 (1977), p. 44.
- Summerfield, Maurice J.: The Classical Guitar. Its Evolution and Players Since 1800 (Newcastle-upon-Tyne: Ashley Mark, 1996).
- Tocatimbal, vol. 4 (Barcelona: Eufònic, 1986).
- Tonazzi, Bruno: Miguel Llobet, Chitarrista dell’Impressionismo (Ancona: Edizioni Bèrben, 1966) (in Italian), OCLC 12560728.
- Trasi, Rino: "La chitarra di Llobet", in: Seicorde no. 44 (March–April 1994), p. 20-27.
- Turnbull, Harvey: The Guitar from the Renaissance to the Present Day (London: Charles Scribner's Sons, 1991).
- Vechten, Carl van: "A Critic's View of Llobet, in: Chelys 1, no. 5 (1977), p. 42 (reprinted from [Chase, Gilbert] The Music of Spain (New York: Alfred A. Knopf, 1918), p. 39-41.
- Weller, Anthony: "Jose Rey de la Torre", in: Guitar Review (Autumn 1994), p. 1-7.
