= Julian Bream =

English classical guitarist and lutenist (1933–2020)

Julian Bream CBE
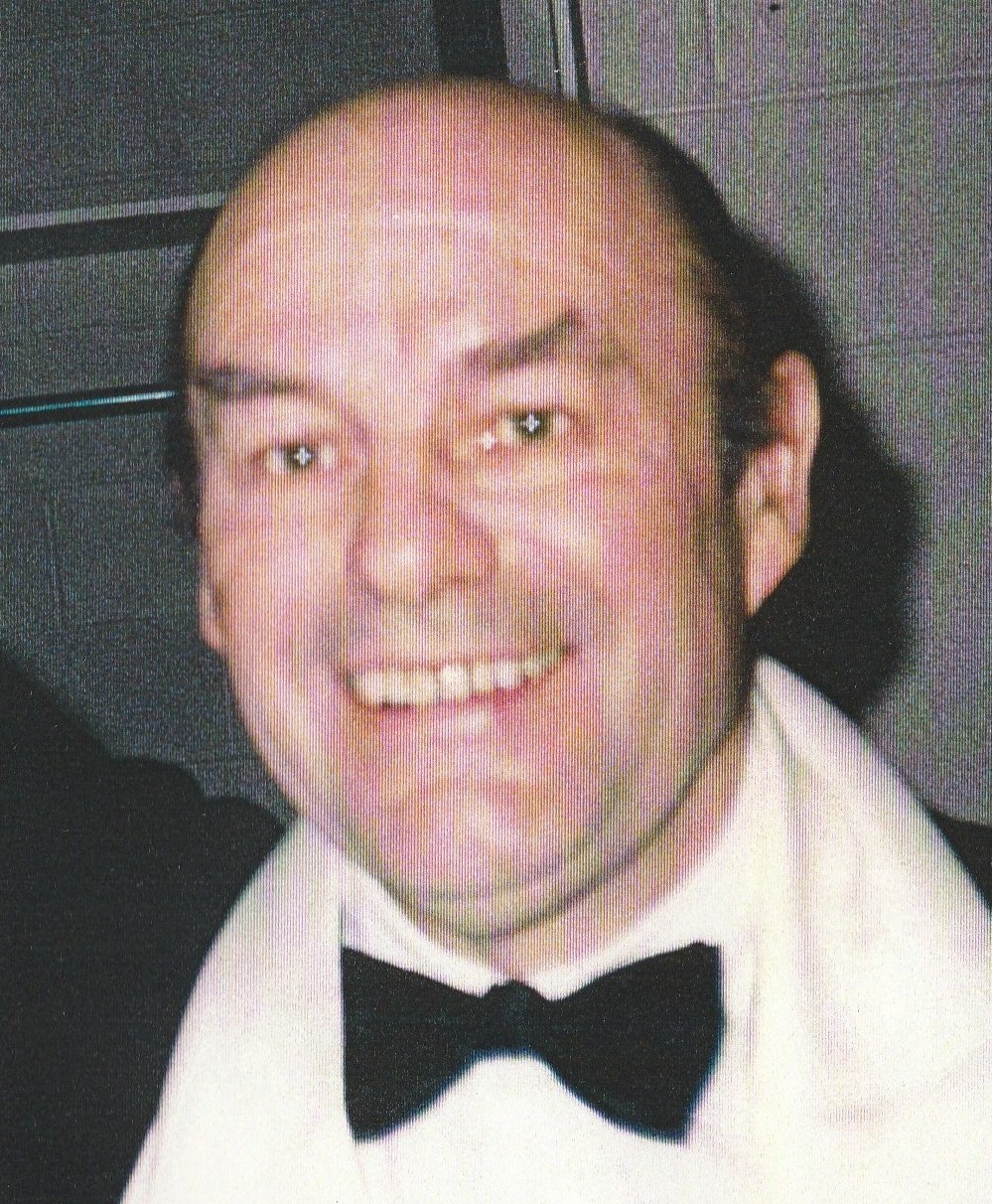
- Bream in 1989
- Born: 15 July 1933; Battersea, London, England
- Died: 14 August 2020 (aged 87); Donhead St Andrew, Wiltshire, England
- Occupations: Classical guitarist; Lutenist
- Organizations: The Julian Bream Consort
- Website: www.julianbreamguitar.com

Julian Alexander Bream CBE (15 July 1933 – 14 August 2020) was an English classical guitarist and lutenist. Regarded as one of the most distinguished classical guitarists of the 20th century, he played a significant role in improving the public perception of the classical guitar as a respectable instrument. Over the course of a career that spanned more than half a century, Bream also helped revive interest in the lute.

== Early years ==
Bream was born in Battersea, London, to Henry and Violet Jessie (née Wright) Bream. At the age of two he moved with his family to Hampton in London, where he was brought up in a musical environment. His father was a commercial artist and an amateur jazz guitarist, who was unable to read music but had a finely attuned ear and could play a lot of popular music. His mother, of Scottish descent, had a warm and loving personality, but no interest in music. His parents divorced when he was 14. His grandmother owned a pub in Battersea, and Bream spent much time there during his youth. The young Bream was impressed by the playing of Django Reinhardt; he later named his dog "Django". Bream played the piano and cello as a child and Reinhardt inspired Bream to take up guitar.

Bream began his lifelong association with the guitar by strumming along on his father's jazz guitar at an early age to dance music on the radio. He became frustrated with his lack of knowledge of jazz harmony, so read instruction books by Eddie Lang to teach himself. His father taught him the basics. The president of the Philharmonic Society of Guitarists, Boris Perott, gave Bream further lessons, while his father became the society librarian, giving young Bream access to a large collection of rare music.

On his 11th birthday, Bream was given a small gut-strung Spanish guitar by his father. He became something of a child prodigy, at 12 winning a junior exhibition award for his piano playing, enabling him to study piano and composition at the Royal College of Music. He made his debut guitar recital at Cheltenham on 17 February 1947, aged 13; in 1951, he debuted at Wigmore Hall.

Bream's father had reservations about Julian pursuing classical guitar. He claimed Bream would find it difficult to earn a living unless he played jazz or something similarly modern. His father's remarks made Bream more persistent and committed to becoming a professional classical guitarist. Bream played the guitar first, then the piano for his audition at the Royal College of Music, even though the guitar was not taught at the institution at the time. When the college accepted Bream, he was advised not to bring his guitar. Bream brought along his guitar regardless as he played for late-night performances. When the school's director discovered he was playing the guitar in one of the school's practice rooms, Bream was asked again to leave his guitar at home. Bream's response to the request was to leave the college.

Leaving the RCM in 1952, Bream was called up into the army for national service. He was originally drafted into the Pay Corps, but managed to sign up for the Royal Artillery Band after six months. This required him to be stationed in Woolwich, which allowed him to moonlight regularly in London with the guitar.

== Career ==
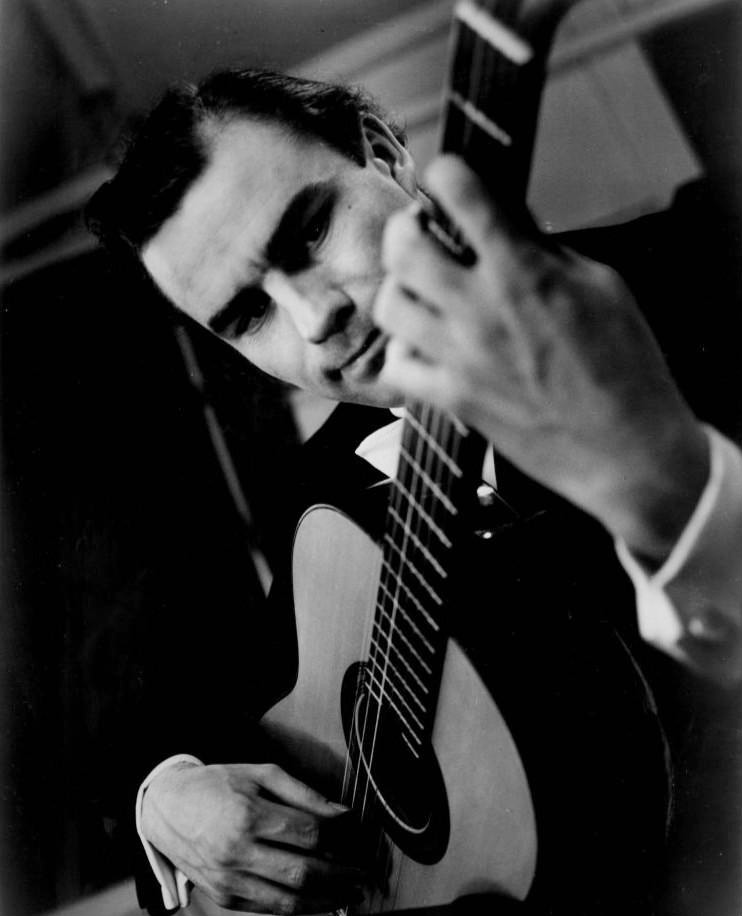
Bream in 1964

After three and half years in the army, he took any musical jobs that came his way, including background music for radio plays and films. Recording sessions and work for the BBC were important to Bream throughout the 1950s and the early 1960s. He played part of a recital at the Wigmore Hall on the lute in 1952. Bream pursued a busy career playing around the world. His first European tours took place in 1954 and 1955, followed (beginning in 1958) by extensive touring in the Far East, India, Australia, the Pacific Islands and many other parts of the world. His first North America tour was in 1959. 1960 saw the formation of the Julian Bream Consort, a period-instrument ensemble with Bream as lutenist. The consort led a great revival of interest in the music of the Elizabethan era. In 1963, Bream performed for the Peabody Mason Concert series in Boston with the US debut of his Consort.

In addition to master classes, Bream was a tutor of the music summer school at Dartington.

== Later career ==
In 1984, Bream seriously injured his right arm in a car accident.

In 1991, BBC Radio and TV broadcast Bream's BBC Prom performance of Malcolm Arnold's Guitar Concerto. He also participated in a recital and concerto performances of works by Tōru Takemitsu at the Japan Festival in London with the London Symphony Orchestra.

During the 1992–93 season he performed on two occasions at the Wigmore Hall – at their Gala Re-opening Festival, and at a special concert celebrating his 60th birthday. In the same period, he toured the Far East, visiting Hong Kong, Taiwan, Korea and Japan, and performed the premiere of Leo Brouwer's arrangement for guitar and orchestra of Albéniz's Iberia at the Proms. In 1994 Bream made debuts in both Turkey and Israel to great acclaim, and the following year played for the soundtrack to the Hollywood film Don Juan DeMarco.

In 1997, in celebration of the 50th anniversary of his debut, he performed a recital at Cheltenham Town Hall. A few weeks later, the BBC dedicated a television tribute This Is Your Life programme to Bream, filmed after a commemorative concert at the Queen Elizabeth Hall, London.

Other engagements around that time included a gala solo performance at the Philharmonic Hall, Liverpool; a Kosovo Aid concert at St. John's, Smith Square, London, with the Academy of St. Martin in the Fields; recitals at the Snape Proms, Aldeburgh, and at the Norfolk and Norwich Festival; and a tour of National Trust properties in summer and autumn 2000.

In November 2001 he gave an anniversary recital at Wigmore Hall, celebrating 50 years since his debut there in 1951. His final recital was at Maddermarket Theatre, Norwich, on 6 May 2002.

== Style and influences ==
Bream's recitals were wide-ranging, including transcriptions from the 17th century, many pieces by Bach arranged for guitar, popular Spanish pieces, and contemporary music, for much of which he was the inspiration. He stated that he was influenced by the styles of Andrés Segovia and Francisco Tárrega. Bream had some "sessions" with Segovia but did not actually study with him. Segovia provided a personal endorsement and scholarship request to assist Bream in taking further formal music studies. Bream's work showed that the guitar could be capably utilized in English, French, and German music.

Bream's playing can be characterised as virtuosic and highly expressive, with an eye for details, and with strong use of contrasting timbres. He did not consistently hold his right-hand fingers at right angles to the strings, but used a less rigid hand position for tonal variety.

Bream met Igor Stravinsky in Toronto, Canada, in 1965. He tried unsuccessfully to persuade the composer to write a composition for the lute and played a pavane by Dowland for him. The meeting between Bream and Stravinsky, including Bream's impromptu playing, was filmed by the National Film Board of Canada in making a documentary about the composer.

== Recordings ==
Bream recorded extensively for RCA Victor and EMI Classics. These recordings won him several awards, including four Grammy Awards, two for Best Chamber Music Performance and two for Best Classical Performance. RCA also released The Ultimate Guitar Collection, a multi-CD set commemorating his birthday in 1993.

Despite his importance as a classical guitarist, many of his RCA recordings (including the series of 20th-century guitar music) were out of print for several years. In 2011, RCA released My Favorite Albums, a 10-CD set of albums chosen by Julian Bream himself. In 2013, RCA issued Julian Bream: The Complete RCA Album Collection, a 40-CD set which also includes two DVDs with The Lively Arts – Julian Bream: A Life in the Country, the 1976 BBC film; and four BBC shows: Omnibus: Anniversary of Sir William Walton [1982], The Julian Bream Consort (1961), Monitor – Film Profile of Julian Bream [1962], and The Julian Bream Consort (1964).

== Television and video ==
A film, A Life in the Country, was first shown on BBC TV in 1976. In it, the narrator and Bream discuss his beginnings and his life as a concert guitarist. Bream also presented a series of four master-classes for guitarists on BBC TV.

In 1984 he made eight film segments on location in Spain for Channel 4. The collection of segments ¡Guitarra! A Musical Journey Through Spain explored historical perspectives of Spanish guitar music.

The 2003 DVD video profile Julian Bream: My Life in Music contains three hours of interviews and performances. It has been declared by Graham Wade "the finest film contribution ever to the classic guitar" and it became "Gramophone DVD of the year".

== Dedications and collaborations ==
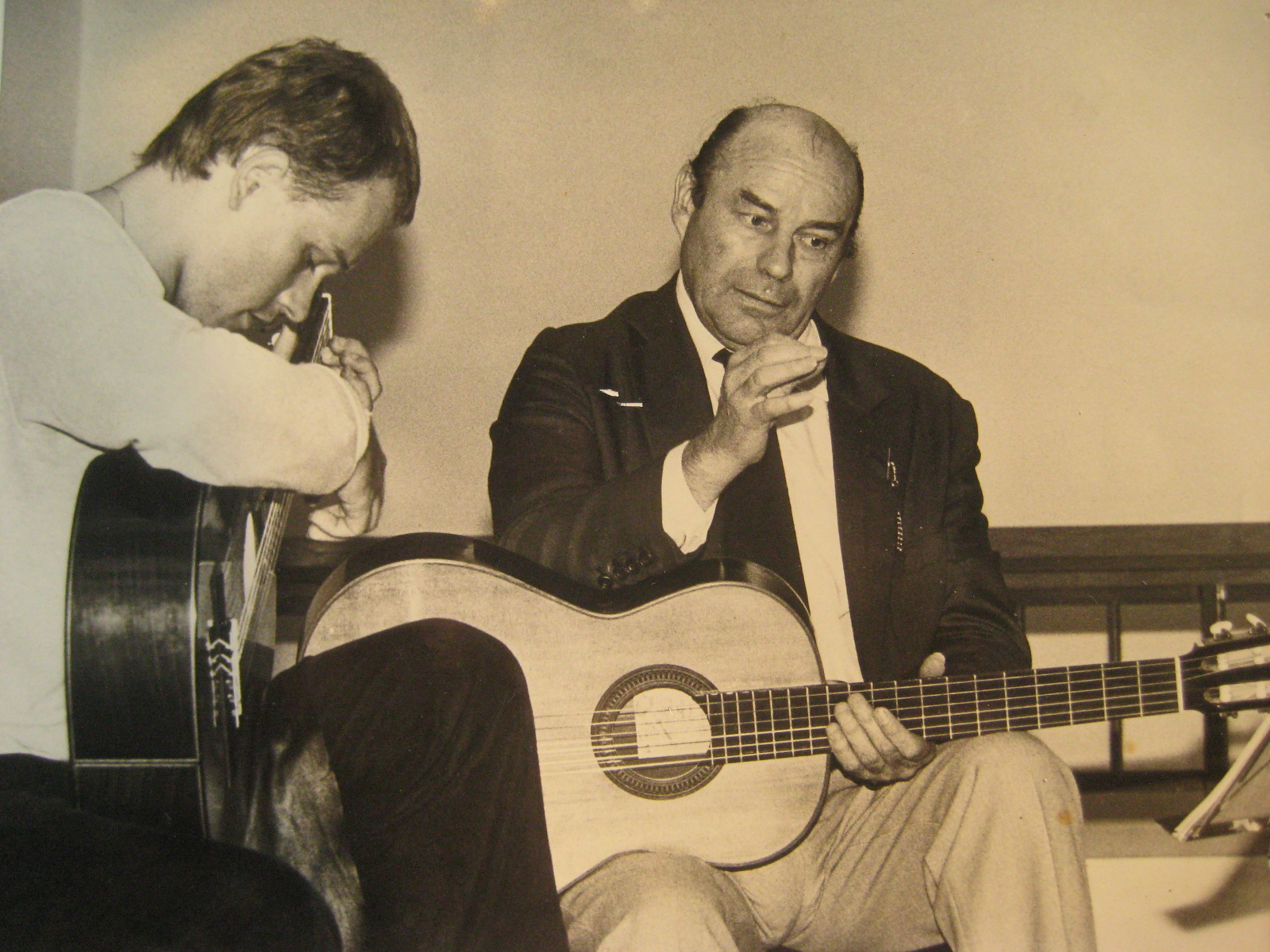
Bream (right) in Liechtenstein, 1985

Many composers worked with Bream, and among those who dedicated pieces to him were Malcolm Arnold, Richard Rodney Bennett, Benjamin Britten, Leo Brouwer, Peter Racine Fricker, Hans Werner Henze, Humphrey Searle, Tōru Takemitsu, Michael Tippett, William Walton and Peter Maxwell Davies. Britten's Nocturnal is one of the most famous pieces in the classical guitar repertoire and was written with Bream specifically in mind. It is an unusual set of variations on John Dowland's "Come, Heavy Sleep" (which is played in its original form at the close of the piece).

Bream also took part in many collaborations, including work with Peter Pears on Elizabethan music for lute and voice, and three records of guitar duets with John Williams.

== Personal life ==
Bream's first wife was Margaret, daughter of the writer Henry Williamson, with whom he adopted a son. After their divorce he married Isabel Sanchez in 1980. That marriage also ended in divorce.

He lived for over 40 years at Broad Oak House, a Georgian farmhouse in Semley, Wiltshire from 1966 until 2008. In 2009 he moved to a smaller house in the neighbouring village of Donhead St Andrew. Bream was keen on the game of cricket and was a member of Marylebone Cricket Club.

Bream died on 14 August 2020, at his home at Donhead St Andrew, at the age of 87.

== Pieces written for Bream ==
Many compositions were written for Bream, including:

- Reginald Smith Brindle: Nocturne for Guitar Solo (1946)
- Reginald Smith Brindle: El Polifemo de Oro (1956)
- Lennox Berkeley: Sonatina, Op. 52, No. 1 (1957)
- Benjamin Britten: Songs from the Chinese for high voice and guitar, Op. 58 (1957)
- Hans Werner Henze: Drei Tentos (Kammermusik 1958)
- Denis ApIvor: Variations for Guitar, Op. 29 (1958)
- Tristram Cary: Sonata (1959)
- Malcolm Arnold: Concerto for Guitar and Chamber Orchestra, Op. 67 (1959)
- Benjamin Britten: Nocturnal after John Dowland, Op. 70 (1963)
- Richard Rodney Bennett: Impromptus (1968)
- Tom Eastwood: Ballade-Phantasy (1968)
- Peter Racine Fricker: Paseo (1969)
- Reginald Smith Brindle: Variants on two themes of J. S. Bach (1970)
- Richard Rodney Bennett: Guitar Concerto (1970)
- Malcolm Arnold: Fantasy, Op. 107 (1971)
- Alan Rawsthorne: Elegy (1971)
- William Walton: Five Bagatelles (1972)
- David Lord: Soliloquy (1973)
- Humphrey Searle: Five (1974)
- Lennox Berkeley: Guitar Concerto, Op. 88 (1974)
- Hans Werner Henze: Royal Winter Music (first sonata, 1976)
- Giles Swayne: Suite, Op. 21 (1976)
- Peter Maxwell Davies: Hill Runes (1981)
- Michael Berkeley: Sonata in One Movement (1982)
- Richard Rodney Bennett: Sonata (1983)
- Michael Tippett: The Blue Guitar (1984)
- Giles Swayne: Solo for Guitar (1986)
- Leo Brouwer: Concerto elegiaco (Guitar Concerto No. 3) (1986)
- Tōru Takemitsu: All in Twilight (1987)
- Leo Brouwer: Sonata (1990)
- Peter Maxwell Davies: Sonata (1990)
- Tōru Takemitsu: Muir Woods (In the Woods) (1996)
- Harrison Birtwistle: Construction with Guitar Player: Beyond the White Hand (2013) (Commissioned by the Julian Bream Trust)
- Leo Brouwer: Ars Combinatoria (Sonata No. 5) (2013) (commissioned by the Julian Bream Trust)

== Awards and recognitions ==
- 1964: Officer of the Order of the British Empire
- 1964: Grammy Award for Best Chamber Music Performance at the Grammy Awards of 1964 for Evening of Elizabethan Music performed by the Julian Bream Consort
- 1966: Honorary Member of the Royal Academy of Music
- 1967: Grammy Award for Best Classical Performance – Instrumental Soloist or Soloists (with or without orchestra) at the Grammy Awards of 1967 for Baroque Guitar (Works of Bach, Sanz, Weiss, etc.)
- 1968: Honorary Doctorate from the University of Surrey
- 1968: Edison Award
- 1972: Grammy Award for Best Instrumental Soloist(s) Performance (with orchestra) at the Grammy Awards of 1972 for André Previn (conductor), Julian Bream & the London Symphony Orchestra for Villa-Lobos: Concerto for Guitar
- 1973: Grammy Award for Best Chamber Music Performance at the Grammy Awards of 1973 for Julian Bream & John Williams for Julian and John (Works by Lawes, Carulli, Albéniz, Granados)
- 1974: Edison Award
- 1976: Villa-Lobos Gold Medal (presented by the composer's widow)
- 1981: Fellowship of the Royal College of Music
- 1983: Fellowship of the Royal Northern College of Music
- 1984: Honorary Doctorate from the University of Leeds
- 1985: Commander of the Order of the British Empire
- 1988: Honorary Member of the Royal Philharmonic Society
- 1996: Royal Philharmonic Society Instrumentalist's Award
- 1999: Doctor of Philosophy from London Guildhall University
- 2009: Honorary Doctorate from the Open University
- 2013: Gramophone Classical Music Awards – Lifetime Achievement

== Discography ==
=== LPs ===
Recordings by Bream include:

- The Art Of Julian Bream (November 1960), RCA Victor LSC-2448
- Guitar Concertos (January 1961), RCA Victor LSC-2487
- The Golden Age of English Lute Music (September 1961), RCA Victor LDS-2560
- An Evening Of Elizabethan Music (1963), RCA Victor LDS-2656 (reissued March 1971 as LSC-3195)
- Julian Bream: Rodrigo, Vivaldi Concertos, Britten Dances from "Gloriana" (1964), RCA Victor LSC-2730
- Dedication, RCA ARL1-5034
- Julian Bream Plays Dowland, CLP 1726
- A Bach Recital for the Guitar, Westminster CLP 1929
- Baroque Guitar (1966), RCA LSC-2878
- The Classical Guitar (3 – LP set), Westminster WMS −1029
- Collection of the Greatest Performances of Julian Bream, Vol. II, Westminster
- Concertos for Lute and Orchestra, RCA ARL1-1180
- Julian Bream in Concert, (with Peter Pears, 1965) RCA LSC2-2964
- 20th Century Guitar, (1967) RCA LSC2-2964
- Dances of Dowland, RCA LSC-2987
- Elizabethan Lute Songs, RCA LSC-3131
- Elizabethan Music by The Julian Bream Consort, RCA LSC-3195
- The Golden Age of English Lute Music, RCA LSC-3196 RCA LD-2560
- J.S. Bach Lute Suites Nos. 1 and 2 (1966), RCA LSC-2896
- Julian & John, (1972) RCA LSC-3257
- Julian Bream '70s, (1973) RCA ARL1-0049
- Julian & John/2, (1974) RCA ARL1-0456
- Julian Bream's Greatest Hits, Westminster
- Julian Bream's Greatest Hits Volume Two, Westminster 9008-8185
- Lute Music of John Dowland, RCA ARL1-1491
- John Dowland: 14 Lute Pieces, Westminster W-9079
- Music for Voice and Guitar with Peter Pears, RCA LSC-2718
- Popular Classics for Spanish Guitar, RCA
- Rodrigo: Concerto De Aranjuez, Berkeley Guitar Concerto (1975), RCA
- Sonatas for Lute and Harpsichord—Bach, Vivaldi with George Malcolm, RCA LSC-3100
- Julian Bream plays Villa-Lobos: Guitar Concerto; Preludes with André Previn & London Symphony Orchestra (1972), RCA LSC-3231
- Villa-Lobos, Twelve Etudes for Guitar, Suite populaire bresillienne (1978), RCA ARL1-2499 / RVC-2233
- Julian Bream, The Art of the Spanish Guitar (1970) RCA SRS 3002
- The Woods So Wild, RCA LSC-3331
- ¡Guitarra!: The Guitar in Spain (1985), RCA (contains material not on the CD)

=== CDs ===
- Fret Works (1990), MCA ASIN B00000DWBQ
- Guitarra: The Guitar in Spain (1990), RCA ASIN B000003EOU
- Joaquin Rodrigo: Concerto Elegiaco/Fantasia Para Un Gentilhombre (1990), RCA ASIN B00000E6E7
- Julian Bream plays Bach (1990), RCA ASIN B000003EOG
- Julian Bream Plays Granados & Albéniz (Music of Spain, Volume Five) (1990), RCA ASIN B00000E68D
- Music of Spain, Vol. 7 (1990), RCA ASIN B00000E697
- Two Loves with Peggy Ashcroft (1990), RCA ASIN B00000E6FM
- Baroque Guitar (1991), RCA ASIN B000003F1J
- La Guitarra Romantica (1991), RCA ASIN B000003F0G
- Rodrigo: Concierto de Aranjuez; Villa-Lobos: Preludes (1991), RCA ASIN B000003EPS
- Romantic Guitar (1991), RCA ASIN B000003EQA
- Baroque Guitar (1993), RCA ASIN B000025HGT
- A Celebration of Andrés Segovia—Bream (1993), RCA ASIN B000009JN3
- Highlights from the Julian Bream Edition (1993), RCA ASIN B000003FKP
- Rodrigo: Concierto de Aranjuez; Fantasía para un gentilhombre No1-5 (1993), RCA ASIN B000003FI4
- Rodrigo: Concierto de Aranjuez; Takemitsu: To the Edge of Dream with Simon Rattle and the City of Birmingham Symphony Orchestra (1993), Capitol ASIN B00000DNS6
- Together/Julian Bream & John Williams (1993), RCA ASIN B000003FDM
- Together Again/ Julian Bream & John Williams (1993), RCA ASIN B000003FDN
- Villa-Lobos: Guitar Concerto; Preludes; Etudes with André Previn and the London Symphony Orchestra (1993), BMG International ASIN B000024RKH
- Bach Guitar Recital (1994), EMI Classics ASIN B000002RU9
- Bach: Lute Suites, Trio Sonatas (1994), RCA ASIN B000003FG2
- Guitar Concertos (1994), RCA ASIN B000003FG4
- Julian Bream Consort, Vol. 6 (1994), RCA ASIN B000003FFX
- Music of Spain (1994), RCA ASIN B000003FG6
- Popular Classics for Spanish Guitar (1994), RCA ASIN B000003FFY
- Romantic Guitar (1994), RCA ASIN B000003FFZ
- Sonata (1995), Angel ASIN B000002RUX
- 20th Century Guitar I (1996), RCA ASIN B000003FG0
- The Golden Age of English Lute Music (1996), RCA ASIN B000003FFW
- Music for Voice & Guitar (1996), RCA ASIN B000003FG1
- Music of Spain: Milán, Narváez (1996), RCA ASIN B000003FG5
- Popular Classics for the Spanish Guitar (1997), RCA ASIN B000003G9U
- Julian Bream Edition, Volume 1: The Golden Age of English Lute Music (28 CDs) (1998), RCA ASIN B000003FFV
- The Romantic Hours (1998), RCA ASIN B000003FSG
- Spain—Sor, Vol. 24 (1998), BMG Classics ASIN B000025HGH
- Guitar Concertos (1999), RCA ASIN B00000HZS3
- Guitar Music by Albeniz, Vivaldi, Rodrigo & Grandos (2 CDs) (1999), RCA Classics/BMG ASIN B00002DFHV
- Woods So Wild (1999), RCA ASIN B00000HZS6
- Nocturnal: Martin, Britten, Brouwer, Lutoslavski (2000), EMI ASIN B000002RTP
- The Ultimate Guitar Collection (2 CDs) (2000), RCA ASIN B00004UEH6
- Duos de Guitares with John Williams (2001), RCA ASIN B00005I9SO
- Spanish Guitar Music (remastered) (2001), Deutsche Grammophon ASIN B00005OLDN
- Spanish Guitar Recital (2001), RCA ASIN B00005OC01
- Rodrigo: Concierto de Aranjuez; Fantasía para un gentilhombre; Tres piezas espanolas; invocacion y danza (remastered) (2004), RCA ASIN B0002DD67Y
- Spanish Guitar Recital (2004), ASIN B000026GX4
- Guitar Recital: Bach, Sor, Turina, Tippet, Schubert (2005), Testament ASIN B0009UC6L2
- Music of Spain (2005), RCA ASIN B0009U55QA
- Elizabethan Lute Songs, Decca ASIN B000ICGD06
- Julian Bream & Friends, Musical Heritage Society ASIN B000294GJK
- Lute Music from the Royal Courts of Europe, BMG Classics ASIN B000G27DIO
- Music of Spain: The Classical Heritage, RCA ASIN B0001GH54C
- My Favorite Albums, RCA/Sony Classical ASIN B001DD0HPG

== Sources ==
- Button, Stewart W. (2005). Julian Bream: The Foundations of a Musical Career. Bold Strummer Limited. ISBN 978-1-57784-067-1.
- Wade, Graham (2008). The Art of Julian Bream. Ashley Mark. ISBN 978-1-872639-66-6.
- Palmer, Tony (2015). Julian Bream, a Life on the Road. London: Gonzo Distributions Limited. ISBN 978-1-908728-52-4. Photographs by Daniel Meadows, includes discography (pp. 204–16)
