= Ana María Martínez =

Puerto Rican soprano

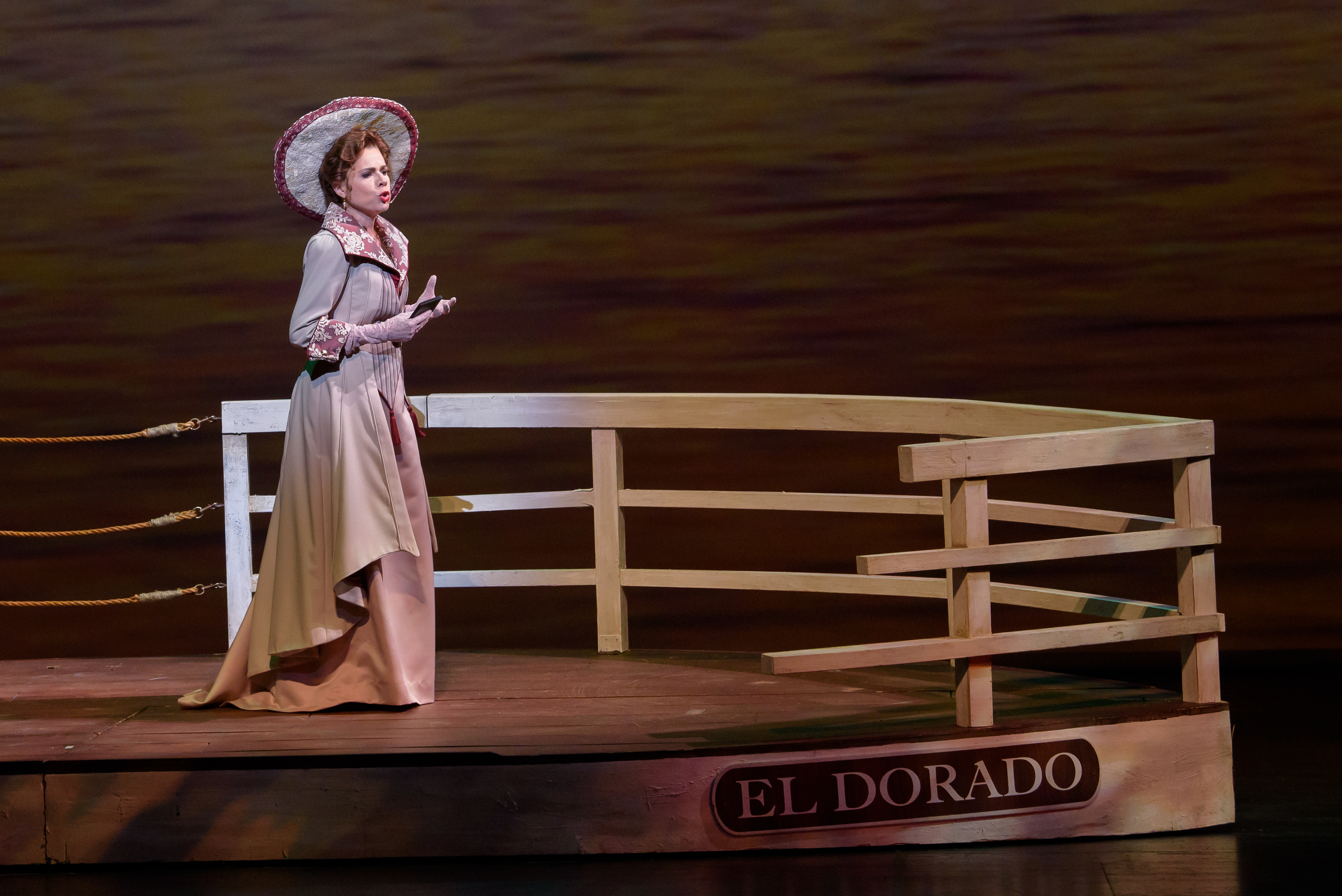
- Martínez in Florencia en el Amazonas at the Florida Grand Opera in 2018
- Born: Ana María Martínez Colón; 1971 (age 54–55); San Juan, Puerto Rico
- Occupation: Operatic soprano
- Years active: 1992–present
- Website: anamariamartinez.com

Ana María Martínez (born 1971) is a Puerto Rican soprano.

== Early life ==
Martínez was born in San Juan, Puerto Rico; she is the daughter of Puerto Rican opera singer Evangelína Colón and Cuban psychoanalyst Ángel Martínez. Martínez' grandparents originated in Spain and France, and migrated to the Caribbean islands. Martínez grew up with a strict Catholic upbringing. She briefly attended the Boston Conservatory as a musical theater major, but dropped out and later received a bachelor's degree and a master's degree from the Juilliard School.

== Career ==
She joined Teatro Colon in Buenos Aires as Rusalka, Opera National de Paris as Luisa Miller, Mimi in La bohéme and for her role debut as Antonia in Les Contes d'Hoffman. She made her debut with the Vienna Staatsoper as Adina in L'elisir d'amore and returned there as Pamina in Die Zauberflöte, Micaëla in Carmen, Mimi in La bohéme, Liù in Turandot and as Cio-Cio-San in Madama Butterfly. In 2006 she was featured in Salzburg Festival's production of Così fan tutte as Fiordiligi. In 2019 she was appointed Houston Grand Opera's first-ever artistic advisor. In 2020, she was announced to join Rice University's Shepherd School of Music as a professor in the Department of Voice effective as from 1 July 2021.

== Special performances ==
On 11 March 2016, Martínez sang Bach/Gounod's "Ave Maria" and "Pie Jesu" from Fauré's Requiem during the funeral services of Nancy Reagan.

She provided the singing voice for Monica Bellucci's character, Alessandra 'La Fiamma', in the third season of Mozart in the Jungle.

Martínez proudly represented her birthplace of Puerto Rico as an honoree and performer in the 62nd Annual Puerto Rican Day Parade in NYC. She performed in tribute to operatic legend Justino Díaz at the 44th Annual Kennedy Center Honors (CBS).

== Personal life ==
Martínez met tenor Chad Shelton in 2000; they married and had one son. They divorced about seven years later. She has been living in Houston since December 2002.

== Awards ==
Martínez has won prizes including the Pepita Embil Award, Operalia, and first prize at the Eleanor McCollum Awards. She won a Latin Grammy in 2001 for Classical Album for Isaac Albéniz's Merlin with Carlos Álvarez, Plácido Domingo, Jane Henschel and conductor José de Eusebio with the Orquesta Sinfónica de Madrid. She is honored in the 15th annual Opera News Awards.

== Discography ==
- Glass: La Belle et la Bête, Nonesuch, 1995
- Sheng: The Song of Majnun – A Persian Romeo and Juliet, Delos, 1997
- Albéniz: Merlin, Decca, 2000
- Glass: Symphony No. 5, Nonesuch, 2000
- Bacalov: Misa Tango, Deutsche Grammophon, 2000
- American Dream: Andrea Bocelli's Statue of Liberty Concert, (TV/DVD) WNET/THIRTEEN, 2000
- Glass: Philip on Film, (Box Set) Nonesuch, 2001
- Rodrigo: 100 Años – La Obra Vocal, I y II, EMI, 2002
- Rodrigo: 100 Años – La Obra Vocal, IV y V, EMI, 2002
- Introducing the World of American Jewish Music for the Milken Archive of American Jewish Music, Naxos, 2003
- Castelnuovo-Tedesco: Naomi and Ruth, Naxos, 2003
- Spanish Night from the Berlin Waldbühne, (DVD) with Plácido Domingo and Sarah Chang, Naxos, 2003
- Albéniz: Henry Clifford, Decca, 2003
- Catan: Florencia en el Amazonas, Albany, 2003
- Levy: Masada (Canto de Los Marranos) for the Milken Archive of American Jewish Music, Naxos, 2004
- Weisgall: T'Kiatot: Rituals for Rosh Hashana, Naxos, 2004
- Soprano Songs and Arias: Ana María Martínez, Naxos, 2005
- American Classics – Beveridge/Marriner for the Milken Archive of American Jewish Music, Naxos, 2005
- Mercurio: Many Voices, Sony, 2006
- Mozart: Così fan tutte, (DVD) Decca, 2007
- Leoncavallo: Pagliacci, Decca, 2007
- Amor, Vida de mi Vida, (DVD) with Plácido Domingo, Euroarts, 2009
- Dvorak: Rusalka, Glyndebourne, 2010
- Concerto: One Night in Central Park with Andrea Bocelli (TV/DVD/CD) WNET / THIRTEEN, 2011
- Manon Lescaut with Andrea Bocelli, Plácido Domingo conducting, Decca 2014

== See also ==
- List of Puerto Ricans
- History of women in Puerto Rico
