= María José Montiel =

Spanish mezzo-soprano opera singer (born 1968)

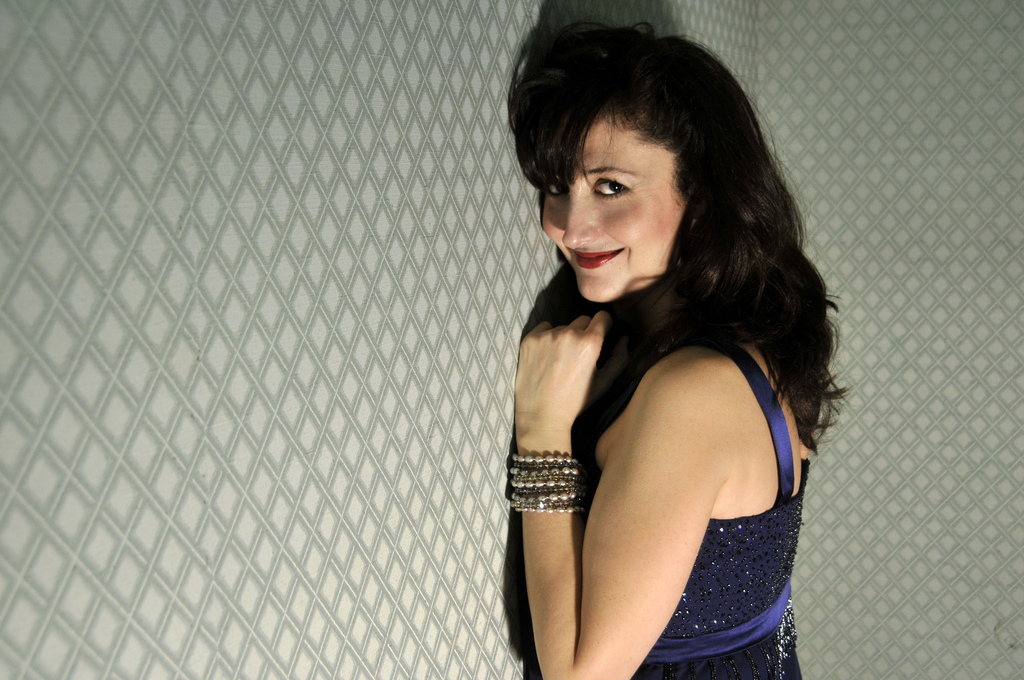
María José Montiel

María José Montiel (born 24 June 1968) is a Spanish mezzo-soprano opera singer born in Madrid. In 2011 she was awarded the Premio Teatro Campoamor for her interpretation of Carmen by the Fundación Premio Líricos Teatro Campoamor.

== Life and career ==
Montiel was born in Madrid. She graduated in vocal performance at the Madrid Conservatory where she studied under Pedro Lavirgen and Ana María Iriarte, before moving to Vienna for further training with Sena Jurinac and Olivera Miljakovic. She studied law at the Autonomous University of Madrid, where she also gained a postgraduate diploma in History and Science of Music.

She has sung the lead role in Carmen in Italy, Switzerland, Germany, France, Spain and Japan. She was a soloist in the Verdi Requiem conducted by Riccardo Chailly and performed in the concert halls of Vienna, Frankfurt, Milan and Budapest, as well as the NHK Hall in Tokyo and the Leipzig Gewandhaus.

She has sung at Carnegie Hall in New York, the Kennedy Center in Washington, D. C., Salle Pleyel and Paris Opera, Théâtre du Capitole in Toulouse, Finlandia Hall in Helsinki, Musikverein, Konzerthaus and Vienna State Opera, Bern Theatre, Bregenz Festival, Sydney Town Hall, La Scala, Teatro Regio di Parma, Teatro Verdi in Pisa, Teatro Comunale di Bologna, La Fenice, Teatro Verdi in Trieste, La Monnaie in Brussels, New National Theatre Tokyo. In Spain she has performed in the Teatro Real and National Auditorium of Music in Madrid, Gran Teatro del Liceo and Palau de la Música Catalana in Barcelona, Palau de la Música in Valencia, Teatro Villamarta in Jerez, Palacio de la Ópera in A Coruña.

At the re-opening of the Teatro Real in Madrid, she sang the lead role in Manuel de Falla's opera La vida breve, alongside the tenor Jaume Aragall. She also performed in Usandizaga's Las golondrinas at the same theatre, where she also participated in the SGAE Centenary Gala with Montserrat Caballé and Alfredo Kraus and in the gala to celebrate the 25th anniversary of the Spanish Constitution. She sang with Plácido Domingo at the re-opening of the Teatro Avenida in Buenos Aires and she performed alongside him in Federico Moreno Torroba's zarzuela, Luisa Fernanda in its first performance at La Scala, before going on tour with the work to the Washington National Opera, Teatro Real de Madrid, Los Angeles Opera and the Theater an der Wien in Vienna.

== Repertoire ==
- Vincenzo Bellini
  - I Capuleti e i Montecchi, Romeo
  - Norma, Adalgisa
- Alban Berg
  - Wozzeck, Marie
- Georges Bizet
  - Carmen, Carmen
- Francesco Cilea
  - Adriana Lecouvreur, Principessa
- Gaetano Donizetti
  - La favorite, Leonore
  - Maria Stuarda, Elisabetta
  - Lucrezia Borgia, Maffio Orsini
- Jules Massenet
  - Werther, Charlotte
  - Don Quichotte, Dulcinea
- Wolfgang Amadeus Mozart
  - La clemenza di Tito, Sesto
  - Così fan tutte, Dorabella
- Amilcare Ponchielli
  - La Gioconda, Laura
- Gioachino Rossini
  - The Barber of Seville, Rosina
- Richard Strauss
  - Ariadne auf Naxos, Komponist
  - Der Rosenkavalier, Oktavian
- Giuseppe Verdi
  - Don Carlo, Eboli
  - Aida, Amneris
  - Il trovatore, Azucena

Her concert repertoire includes Les nuits d'été and Scenes from Faust by Hector Berlioz, Gustav Mahler's Lieder eines fahrenden Gesellen and second and eighth symphonies, Verdi's Requiem, Vivaldi's Gloria, Beethoven's Ninth Symphony, Messa di Gloria and Stabat Mater by Rossini, Shéhérazade by Maurice Ravel, and Alto Rhapsody by Brahms. She gives special consideration to Spanish composers, having participated in the revival of Isaac Albéniz's opera Pepita Jiménez and his Merlin and in premieres of works by contemporary composers such as Ojos Verdes de Luna by Tomás Marco and Eufonía by Xavier Montsalvatge, as well as pieces by Cruz de Castro, Peris, Bernaola, Ramón Barce and a large portion of the Antón García Abril vocal repertoire.

== Prizes ==
She has been awarded the Lucrecia Arana award, the SGAE Federico Romero prize, the RNE Ojo Crítico award, the CEOE prize and the Spanish Coca-Cola Foundation award for best singer. In 2007 the Community of Madrid awarded her with the Culture Prize in the music section.

== Discography ==
Her recordings number a total of 17 discs, for labels such as Dial, BIS, RTVE, Ensayo, Fundación Author, Decca, Deutsche Grammophon and Stradivarius. Her CD of lieder from Brazil, Modinha, with Luiz de Moura Castro was a finalist in the Grammy Awards and her DVD Madrileña Bonita went gold.
