= Henry Clifford (opera) =

1895 opera by Isaac Albéniz

- Grand opera by Isaac Albéniz
- Fragment of the autograph score for Henry Clifford (tenor and soprano duet, Act 3)
- Librettist: Francis Money-Coutts
- Language: English
- Based on: Henry Clifford, 10th Baron Clifford
- Premiere: 8 May 1895; Gran Teatro del Liceo, Barcelona

Henry Clifford is a grand opera in three acts composed by Isaac Albéniz to an English libretto written by Francis Money-Coutts (under the pseudonym "Mountjoy"). It premiered at the Gran Teatro del Liceo on 8 May 1895. The opera is based on historical figures and events and is set in 15th-century England during the Wars of the Roses, fought between the rival houses of Lancaster and York. The title character, Henry Clifford, 10th Baron Clifford, was the only son of John Clifford, a Lancastrian commander killed in the bloodiest battle of the war, the Battle of Towton, on 29 March 1461. Henry Clifford himself was one of the chief commanders in the Battle of Flodden against the Scots in 1513.

== Composition ==
Henry Clifford was written in 1893–95, the first of a series of operas by Albéniz which were commissioned and supplied with English libretti by the wealthy Englishman Francis Money-Coutts. Other operas in the series are Pepita Jiménez (1896) and Merlin (1902). Albéniz began writing the opera while living in London, but subsequently moved to Barcelona where he completed the piano–vocal score for the second act. After a few months he became uncomfortable with the conservative cultural conditions under the Bourbon dynasty in Spain, and moved to Paris where the remainder of the work was completed in 1894–95.

== Performance history ==
Albéniz conducted the premiere of Henry Clifford (under the title Enrico Clifford) in Barcelona at the Gran Teatro del Liceo on 8 May 1895. The singers included Emanuel Suagnes in the title role, Angelica Nava as Lady Clifford, and Andrés Perellò de Segurola as Sir John Saint-John. Although the opera was originally written in English, Italian was standard at the Liceo, and an Italian libretto was supplied by Giuseppe M. Arteaga Pereira. The libretto was published in both English and Italian (Barcelona: J.B. Pujol, 1895). The work was given five performances with the final performance on May 12.

The opera was reconstructed and recorded in 2002 by the Spanish musicologist and conductor José de Eusebio. On 24 January 2009, he conducted the Orquesta Filarmónica de Gran Canaria in the world premiere performance of Henry Clifford with its original English libretto in the Auditorio Alfredo Kraus, Las Palmas de Gran Canaria. The performance was in concert version with John MacMaster as Henry Clifford, Ana María Sánchez as Lady Clifford, María Rey-Joly as Annie Saint-John, David Wilson-Johnson as Sir John Saint-John, and Larissa Diadkova as Lady Saint-John.

== Critical reception ==
Writing about the 1895 Barcelona premiere, the newspaper La Vanguardia reported that the "applause, acclamations, and shouts of enthusiasm ... still sound in our ears." The Spanish critic J. Roca y Roca, writing in the same newspaper, said: "Albéniz triumphed over everything: over the distrust of certain unimaginative spirits ill-disposed to recognize the superior merits of a composer who has excelled as an outstanding concert pianist; he has triumphed over the suspicions and fears of the theater management...; Albéniz, finally, has succeeded in becoming a prophet in his own country." The critic blamed the shortness of the run on inadequate rehearsal, a lack of support from the theater's management, and the fact that the first performances were at the end of the season.

== Roles ==
Roles, voice types, premiere cast
Role	Voice type	Premiere cast, 8 May 1895 Conductor: Isaac Albéniz
Henry Clifford	tenor	Emanuel Suagnes
Lady Clifford	soprano	Angelica Nava
Sir John Saint-John	baritone	Andrés Perellò de Segurola
Lady Saint-John	mezzo-soprano	Concetta Mas
Annie Saint-John	soprano	Adele Marra-Mirò
Colin ("Nicola" in the Italian libretto)	baritone	Francesco Puyggener
Messenger	tenor	
Herald	baritone	
Soldiers, peasants, Lady Clifford's attendants, crowd (children, men and women)

== Recording ==
Albéniz: Henry Clifford – Orquesta Sinfónica de Madrid

- Conductor: José de Eusebio
- Principal singers: Aquiles Machado (Henry Clifford); Alessandra Marc (Lady Clifford); Carlos Álvarez (Sir John Saint John); Jane Henschel (Lady Saint John); Ana Maria Martínez (Annie Saint John); Christian Immler (Colin); Ángel Rodríguez (Messenger).
- Recording location & date: Auditorio Nacional de Música de Madrid, 19–27 July 2002
- Label: Decca – 473 937-2 (2 CDs)

== Sources ==
- Anon. (7 May 1895a). "Espectáculos". La Vanguardia (in Spanish). p. 6.
- Anon. (8 May 1895b). "El estreno de la ópera Henry Clifford". La Vanguardia (in Spanish). p. 4.
- Baxter, Sue (White Label Productions Limited), ed., Libretto & booklet for CD recording Decca 473 937-2, Ediciones Iberautor/Instituto Complutense de Cencias Musicales (ICCMU), 2003.
- Casaglia, Gherardo (2005)."Henry Clifford, 8 May 1895". L'Almanacco di Gherardo Casaglia (in Italian).
- Clark, Walter Aaron (2002). Isaac Albeniz: Portrait of a Romantic. Oxford University Press. ISBN 0-19-925052-9.
- Díaz Ramos, Roberto (25 January 2009). "La cara oculta de Isaac Albéniz". La Provincia (in Spanish).
- Payá, Juanjo (25 January 2009). "Henry Clifford, un regalo para Albéniz desde las Islas". La Opinión de Tenerife (in Spanish).
