= Éva Marton =

Hungarian opera singer

- Born: 18 June 1943 (age 83); Budapest, Hungary
- Occupation: Opera singer (soprano)
- Known for: The Marriage of Figaro; Attila; Turandot; Tosca; Madama Butterfly; The Golden Cockerel
- Website: martoneva.hu

Éva Marton (born 18 June 1943) is a Hungarian dramatic soprano, particularly known for her operatic portrayals of Puccini's Turandot and Tosca, and Wagnerian roles.

== Vocal training and early years ==
Marton was born in Budapest, where she studied voice at the Franz Liszt Academy.

She made her professional debut as Kate Pinkerton in Puccini's Madama Butterfly at Hungary's Margaret Island summer festival. At the Hungarian State Opera, she made her debut as Queen of Shemaka in Rimsky-Korsakov's The Golden Cockerel in 1968.

In 1972, she was invited by Christoph von Dohnányi to make her debut as the Countess in Mozart's The Marriage of Figaro at the Frankfurt Opera. That same year, she sang Matilde in Rossini's William Tell in Florence, conducted by Riccardo Muti.

She returned to Budapest to sing Odabella in Verdi's Attila. In 1973, Marton made her debut at the Vienna State Opera in Puccini's Tosca. In 1977, she sang at the Hamburg State Opera, in the role of the Empress in Richard Strauss's Die Frau ohne Schatten, and made her San Francisco Opera debut in the title role of Verdi's Aida. In 1978, Marton made her debut at La Scala in Milan as Leonora in Verdi's Il trovatore. She debuted at the Lyric Opera of Chicago in 1979 as Maddalena in Giordano's Andrea Chénier.

In 1981, she performed at the Munich Opera Festival in the title role of Die ägyptische Helena by Richard Strauss with Wolfgang Sawallisch conducting. She sang the role of Leonore in Beethoven's Fidelio in 1982 and 1983, both performances conducted by Lorin Maazel.

== Wagnerian roles ==
In 1976, she made her Metropolitan Opera debut in New York in the role of Eva in Richard Wagner's Die Meistersinger von Nürnberg. At the Bayreuth Festival she sang both Elisabeth and Venus in Tannhäuser in 1977–1978. In 1982, Marton performed the role of Elisabeth in Tannhäuser at the Metropolitan Opera. Of that performance, The New York Times wrote:

The arrival on the scene of a fully matured Wagnerian singer is always good news, however long we must wait between dispatches from the front. The news today is that Eva Marton has arrived. The Hungarian artist, portraying Elisabeth for the first time with the Metropolitan Opera in Monday night's Tannhäuser, showed that she has the vocal and temperamental qualities to become the opera world's next important dramatic soprano. She may, in fact, already be there. The timbre is right, the sheer staying power is impressive and the instincts are those of a born actress.

Marton later became a frequent interpreter of the role of Brünnhilde in Wagner's Der Ring des Nibelungen. Between 1982 and 1985, she performed the role in the Ring cycle with the San Francisco Opera. A decade later she performed in the complete Zubin Mehta-led Ring cycle at the Lyric Opera of Chicago in 1996. In 1998, she appeared in a new production of Lohengrin at the Hamburg State Opera, portraying Ortrud.

== Turandot ==
Marton first sang the title role of Puccini's last opera Turandot at the Vienna State Opera in 1983. It became a role with which she has been closely identified. Since 1983, she has performed the role over a hundred times including at the Metropolitan Opera, La Scala, Arena di Verona, San Francisco Opera, Lyric Opera of Chicago, Washington Opera, Opera Company of Boston under Sarah Caldwell (in 1983), Barcelona, and Houston Grand Opera. She has also portrayed Turandot in six television and video productions, including a Vienna State Opera production directed by Harold Prince featuring José Carreras as Calaf, a Metropolitan Opera production created by Franco Zeffirelli featuring Placido Domingo as Calaf, and a production designed by David Hockney filmed at the San Francisco Opera with Michael Sylvester as Calaf. She also sang the role at the Aurora Opera House in Gozo, Malta. She has recorded Turandot twice, conducted first by Lorin Maazel (again with Carreras as Calaf) and later Roberto Abbado (with Ben Heppner as Calaf).

== Recent years ==
Marton's new roles in this millennium include Isolde in Wagner's Tristan und Isolde at Hamburg State Opera in 2000, and Kundry in Parsifal in Barcelona and Lisbon in 2001. In 2003, she sang the English-language role of Morgan Le Fay in the premiere of Isaac Albeniz's Merlin in Madrid. In 2006 and 2007, she performed in a concert version of Giordano's Fedora at the Miskolc Opera Festival, in Elektra by Richard Strauss at the Deutsche Oper am Rhein in Düsseldorf, and in Janáček's Jenůfa in Hamburg, in the role of the Kostelnicka. She performed the role of Klytemnestra in Elektra in Barcelona (Spain) in February and March 2008, and sang Klytämnestra in a staged performance of Elektra in Grand Théâtre de Genève in November 2010. She also keeps a small studio at the Liszt Academy of Music in Budapest, Hungary. Marton received the Persian Golden Lioness Lifetime Achievement Award in operatic music from the World Academy of Arts, Literature and Media (WAALM) in 2006.

Marton has also worked as a voice teacher. Between 2005 and 2013 she was head of the voice department at the Franz Liszt Academy of Music where she is now a professor emeritus.

== Videography ==
- The Metropolitan Opera Centennial Gala, Deutsche Grammophon DVD, 00440–073–4538, 2009

=== Official Opera Gala and Concert Recordings ===
1./ José Carreras e le grandi voci festeggiano l’Arena – La grande notte a Verona (8. VIII. 1988. Arena di Verona) CD POLYPHON 836 447 Live. José Carreras & Éva Marton, Montserrat Caballé, Ghena Dimitrova, Ileana Cotrubas, Orquesta Sinfonica di Madrid, Conductors: José Collado, Carlo Franci

2./ Le donne di Puccini – Puccini-Gala (12. XI. 1994. München) CD: NIGHTINGALE CLASSICS 7063197 Live. Éva Marton, Gabriela Beňačková, Edita Gruberová, Gwyneth Jones Münchner Rundfunkorchester, Conductor: García Navarro

3./ Let's Save the Liszt Academy! HUNGAROTON HCD 31841 Live. (Concerts in Budapest / Hungarian State Opera, Franz Liszt Academy of Music/, 1995, 1997, 1998) Éva Marton, Éva Pánczél, Bartók String Quartet, Conductor: Ervin Lukács, János Kovács

=== Opera, Concert: Video and DVD ===
1./ Isaac Albéniz: Merlin – Morgan le Fay (2003. Madrid, Teatro Real – Live World Premier) VHS and DVD BBC / Opus Arte B0001RVRX6 Live. Éva Marton, Carol Vaness, Stuart Skelton, David Wilson-Johnson Conductor: José de Eusebio, Production: John Dew

2./ Erkel: Bánk bán – Gertrudis (2001, Movie Film) FHS and DVD – Warner Music Hungary 0927 44606 Andrea Rost, Éva Marton, Atilla Kiss B., Dénes Gulyás, Lajos Miller, Sándor Sólyom-Nagy, Attila Réti, Kolos Kováts Orchestra for Hungarian Millennium, Hungarian National Chorus, Honvéd Male Chorus, – Conductor: Tamás Pál, Production: Csaba Káel, Cinematographer: Vilmos Zsigmond

3./ Umberto Giordano: Andrea Chénier – Maddaléna (1985. Milano, Teatro alla Scala) VHS and DVD: Warner Vision NVC Arts 3984 26655-2 Live. Éva Marton, José Carreras, Piero Cappuccilli Conductor: Riccardo Chailly, Production: Lamberto Puggelli

4./ Almicare Ponchielli: La Gioconda – Gioconda (1986, Wien, Staatsoper) VHS ARTHAUS 100 232 (PAL), DVD ARTHAUS 100 233 Live. Éva Marton, Plácido Domingo, Ludmilla Semtschuk, Matteo Manuguerra, Margarita Lilowa, Kurt Rydl Conductor: Ádám Fischer, Production / Bühnenbild / Kostüme: Filippo Sanjust

5./ Giacomo Puccini: Tosca – Tosca (1984, Arena di Verona) VHS and DVD: NVC Arts 4509 99219-2 Live. Éva Marton, Giacomo Aragall, Ingvar Wixell Conductor: Daniel Oren, Production: Sylvano Bussotti

6./ Giacomo Puccini: Tosca – Tosca (1985, Sydney, Opera House) VHS and DVD: KULTUR VIDEO 1213 (NTSC) Live. Éva Marton, Lamberto Furlan, John Shaw Conductor: Alberto Erede, Production: John Copley

7./ Giacomo Puccini: Turandot – Turandot (1983, Wien, Staatsoper) VHS and DVD: Arthaus Musik 107319 Live. Éva Marton, José Carreras, Katia Ricciarelli Conductor: Lorin Maazel, Production: Harold Prince

8./ Giacomo Puccini: Turandot – Turandot (1987, New York, Metropolitan Opera House) VHS and DVD: DG UCBG 1007; DG 073 058-9 Live. Éva Marton, Plácido Domingo, Leona Mitchell, Paul Plishka Conductor: James Levine, Production / Set designer: Franco Zeffirelli

9./ Giacomo Puccini: Turandot – Turandot (1993, San Francisco, War Memorial Opera House) VHS and DVD: ARTHAUS 100 088 (PAL) Live. Éva Marton, Lucia Mazzaria, Michael Sylvester, Kevin J. Langan Conductor: Donald Runnicles, Production and Design: David Hockney, Stage Director: Peter McClintock

10./ Richard Strauss: Elektra – Elektra (1989, Wien, Staatsoper) VHS and DVD ARTHAUS 100 016; ARTHAUS 100 049 Live. Eva Marton, Cheryl Studer, Brigitte Fassbaender, James King, Franz Grundheber Conductor: Claudio Abbado, Production: Harry Kupfer

11./ Richard Strauss: Die Frau ohne Schatten – Färberin (1992, Salzburger Festspiele) VHS and DVD: DECCA 071 425-9 Live. Cheryl Studer, Éva Marton, Andrea Rost, Elizabeth Norberg Schulz, Marjana Lipovšek, Thomas Moser, Herbert Lippert, Robert Hale, Bryn Terfel Conductor: Sir Georg Solti, Production: Götz Friedrich

12./ Giuseppe Verdi: Il trovatore – Leonora (1988, New York, Metropolitan Opera House) VHS and DVD DG 073 002-9 (NTSC) Live. Éva Marton, Dolora Zajick, Luciano Pavarotti, Sherrill Milnes, Jeffrey Wells Conductor: James Levine, Production: Fabrizio Melano

13./ Richard Wagner: Lohengrin – Elsa (1986, New York, Metropolitan Opera House) VHS and DVD: DG 073 4176; DG 6727 Live. Éva Marton, Leonie Rysanek, Peter Hofmann, Leif Roar, Anthony Raffell, John Macurdy Conductor: James Levine, Production: August Everding

14./ Richard Wagner: Tannhäuser – Elisabeth (1982, New York, Metropolitan Opera House) VHS and DVD: DG 073 4171; DG B 0006580-09 Live. Richard Cassilly, Eva Marton, Bernd Weikl, Tatiana Troyanos, John Macurdy Conductor: James Levine, Production: Otto Schenk

15./ Éva Marton in Concert – 20. Anniversary Gala Concert – 3. IX. 1988. Budapest, Congress Center -MTV Live. Éva Marton, Hungarian State Symphony Orchestra, Conductor: Julius Rudel

=== Opera Gala Video and DVD ===
1./New York, Metropolitan Opera House – Centennial Gala 1983. 10. 22.) VHS and DVD: DG 001326309 Live. Éva Marton: G. Puccini: Turandot – Turandot „In questa reggia…” Cond.: James Levine

2./ José Carreras e le grandi voci festeggiano l’Arena – La grande notte a Verona (1988. 08. 08., Arena di Verona) VHS and DVD: Arthaus Music 101403 Live. Éva Marton: G. Puccini: Manon Lescaut – Act IV. Aria of Manon Lescaut
