= Carol Vaness =

American opera singer and educator

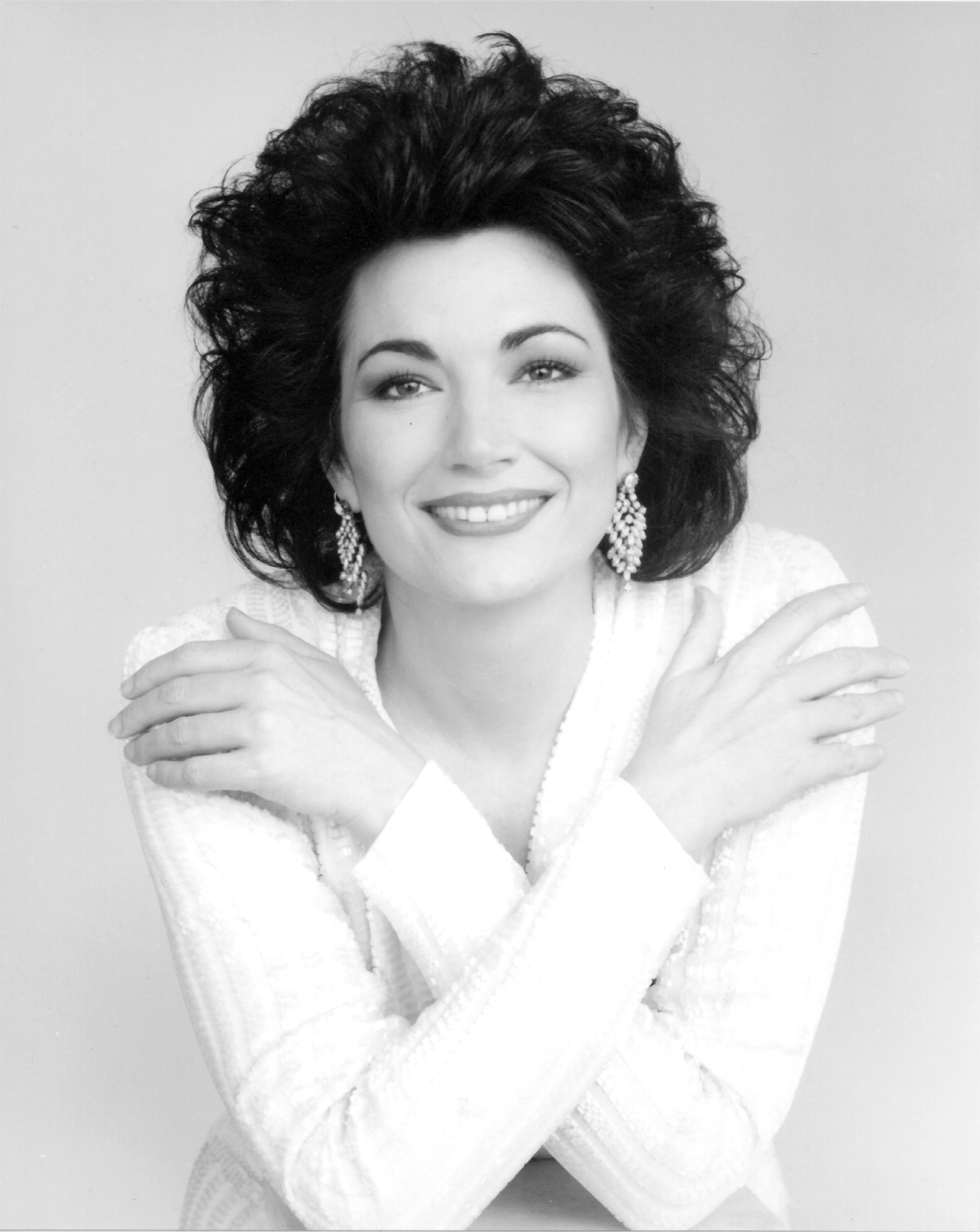
Carol Vaness, American soprano

Carol Theresa Vaness (born July 27, 1952) is an American lirico-spinto soprano and university professor.

== Early life and education ==
Vaness was born in San Diego and graduated with her bachelor's degree from California State Polytechnic University, Pomona. She later attended California State University, Northridge where she earned her master's degree in 1976.

== Career ==
Vaness launched her professional career in 1977 with the San Francisco Opera. She appeared regularly at the New York City Opera from 1979 to 1983. She made her Metropolitan Opera debut in 1984 and has sung at many of the major opera houses of Europe, including Teatro alla Scala, the Vienna State Opera, Paris Opera, and the Royal Opera House/Covent Garden. In 1993 she performed the role of Duchess Elena in I vespri siciliani with the Washington Concert Opera.

She was particularly known for her Mozart operatic roles, but she has performed in a wide range of operas, including the title role in Giacomo Puccini's Manon Lescaut with the Seattle Opera. Her interpretations of Mozart's dramatic heroines, including Fiordiligi in Così fan tutte, Donna Anna and Donna Elvira in Don Giovanni, Elettra in Idomeneo, and Vitellia in La Clemenza di Tito, have been hailed as definitive, and she has become especially identifiable with the role of Tosca, which she performed at the Metropolitan Opera in 2004 opposite Luciano Pavarotti in the legendary tenor's final operatic performance.

Vaness made her professional debut as Vitellia from Mozart's La clemenza di Tito for the San Francisco Spring Opera and has been acknowledged as the world's leading interpreter of this role. She has appeared as Vitellia at the Metropolitan Opera, Paris Opera, Royal Opera Covent Garden, Lyric Opera of Chicago, New York City Opera, Liceu, and at the Salzburg Festival and other leading theaters.

Among her celebrated television appearances, she has been featured on the Pavarotti Plus and Pavarotti and Friends telecasts from Lincoln Center, as well as the Richard Tucker Gala and In Performance at the White House with members of the New York City Opera.

Vaness teaches in the renowned voice department of Indiana University. Her hire came as part of the school's "Commitment to Excellence" program, which also brought the matriculation of Jaime Laredo, André Watts, and Joshua Bell. She is a tenured professor of voice working with individual students as well as conducting the opera workshop classes. She began teaching in 2006, and a number of her students have gone to win major nationwide and international competitions and positions in young artist programs.

== Discography ==
=== Operas ===
Year of release	Album details	Contributing artists	Label
1984	Mozart: Don Giovanni	Thomas Allen, Maria Ewing, Elizabeth Gale, Keith Lewis, Richard Van Allan, John Rawnsley, Dimitri Kavrakos, Glyndebourne Festival Chorus, London Philharmonic Orchestra, Bernard Haitink	EMI
1987	Mozart: Così fan tutte	Delores Ziegler, John Aler, Dale Duesing, Lillian Watson, Claudio Desderi, Glyndebourne Festival Chorus, London Philharmonic Orchestra, Bernard Haitink	EMI
1991	Mozart: Don Giovanni	William Shimell, Samuel Ramey, Cheryl Studer, Frank Lopardo, Susanne Mentzer, Wiener Staatsopernchor, Wiener Philharmoniker, Riccardo Muti	EMI
1993	Puccini: Tosca	Giuseppe Giacomini, Giorgio Zancanaro, Piero De Palma, Westminster Symphonic Choir, Philadelphia Orchestra, Riccardo Muti	Philips Classics
1993	Gluck: Iphigénie en Tauride	Thomas Allen, Gösta Winbergh, Giorgio Surian, Coro e Orchestra del Teatro alla Scala, Riccardo Muti	Sony
1995	Mozart: Le nozze di Figaro	Alastair Miles, Nuccia Focile, Alessandro Corbelli, Susanne Mentzer, Rebecca Evans, Alfonso Antoniozzi, Suzanne Murphy, Ryland Davies, Scottish Chamber Orchestra and Chorus, Sir Charles Mackerras	Telarc
1995	Mozart: La clemenza di Tito	Gösta Winbergh, Christine Barbaux, Delores Ziegler, Martha Senn, László Polgár, Wiener Philharmoniker, Riccardo Muti	EMI
1996	Mozart: Idomeneo	Plácido Domingo, Cecilia Bartoli, Heidi Grant Murphy, Thomas Allen, Frank Lopardo, Bryn Terfel, Orchestra and Chorus of the Metropolitan Opera House, James Levine	DG
1999	Rossini: Mosè	Doris Soffel, Francisco Araiza, Ruggero Raimondi, Kurt Moll, Jan-Hendrik Rootering, Bayerisches Staatsorchester, Wolfgang Sawallisch	Orfeo (live recording from 1988)
2001	Verdi: Aroldo	Neil Shicoff, Anthony Michaels-Moore, Roberto Scandiuzzi, Julian Gavin, Sergio Spina, Marina Comparato, Orchestra e Coro del Maggio Musicale Fiorentino, Fabio Luisi	Philips
2006	Albéniz: Pepita Jiménez	Plácido Domingo, Jane Henschel, Enrique Baquerizo, Carlos Chausson, Orquesta de la Comunidad de Madrid, José de Eusebio	DG

=== Symphonic works, recitals, compilations, etc. ===
Year of release	Album details	Contributing artists	Label
1985	Beethoven: Symphony No. 9	Janice Taylor, Siegfried Jerusalem, Robert Lloyd, The Cleveland Orchestra and Chorus, Christoph von Dohnányi	Telarc
1988	Verdi Arias	The British Concert Orchestra, Frank Renton	Nixa Classics
1989	Haydn: Theresienmesse / Heiligmesse	Doris Soffel, Keith Lewis, Petteri Salomaa, Rundfunkchor Leipzig, Staatskapelle Dresden, Sir Neville Marriner	EMI
1990	Beethoven: Missa Solemnis	Waltraud Meier, Hans Peter Blochwitz, Hans Tschammer, Tallis Chamber Choir, English Chamber Orchestra, Jeffrey Tate	EMI
1990	Rossini: Stabat Mater	Cecilia Bartoli, Francisco Araiza, Ferruccio Furlanetto, Symphonieorchester und Chor des Bayerischen Rundfunks, Semyon Bychkov	Philips Classics
1991	Mozart: Opera Arias	Münchner Rundfunkorchester, Leopold Hager	RCA Victor Red Seal
1992	A Salute to American Music: The Richard Tucker Music Foundation - Gala XVI	Renée Fleming, Karen Holvik, Leontyne Price, Marilyn Horne, Frederica von Stade, Tatiana Troyanos, Paul Groves, Jerry Hadley, Robert Merrill, Sherrill Milnes, Samuel Ramey, Metropolitan Opera Orchestra, James Conlon	RCA Victor Red Seal
1992	Verdi: Requiem	Florence Quivar, Dennis O'Neill, Carlo Colombara, Symphonieorchester und Chor des Bayerischen Rundfunks, Sir Colin Davis	RCA Victor Red Seal
1996	Carol Vaness sings Verdi and Donizetti	Marisca Mulder, Melinda Paulsen, Dennis O'Neill, Ambrogio Riva, Münchner Rundfunkorchester, Roberto Abbado	RCA Victor Red Seal
1998	Britten: War Requiem	Jerry Hadley, Thomas Hampson, Westminster Symphonic Choir, New York Philharmonic, Kurt Masur	Teldec
2014	Classic Mad Scenes (Historic Met Broadcasts)	Roberta Peters, Grace Bumbry, Renata Scotto, Edita Gruberová, Luciana Serra, Philip Langridge, Metropolitan Opera Orchestra, James Levine	The Metropolitan Opera

== Videography ==
- James Levine's 25th Anniversary Metropolitan Opera Gala (1996), Deutsche Grammophon DVD, B0004602-09
