= Francis Money-Coutts, 5th Baron Latymer =

English opera librettist, poet, and heir (1852 – 1923)

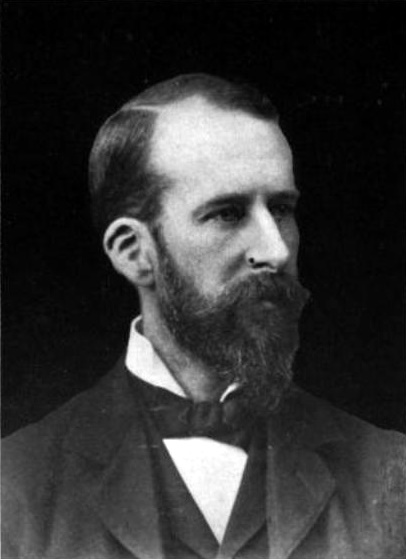

Francis Burdett Thomas Nevill Money-Coutts, 5th Baron Latymer (18 September 1852 – 8 June 1923) was a London solicitor, poet, librettist, and wealthy heir to the fortune of the Coutts banking family. He is now remembered chiefly as a patron and collaborator of the Spanish composer Isaac Albéniz.

== Family history ==
His father was the Reverend James Drummond Money (d. 1875), and his mother was Clara Burdett (d. 1899). Clara was the daughter of Sir Francis Burdett (1770–1844) and Sophia Coutts (d. 1844). Sophia was one of three daughters of the wealthy banker Thomas Coutts. In 1875 Francis Money, as he was then named, married Edith Ellen Churchill. In 1881, his mother Clara's sister Angela Burdett violated the terms of the will making her the sole heir of the Coutts fortune, by marrying a foreigner (an American 40 years her junior). Seeing an opportunity, Clara and her son adopted the name "Coutts," as required by the will, and contested Angela's claims. A settlement was reached, and Angela received two-fifths of the income until her death in 1906, at which time Francis became the sole beneficiary.

== Education and professional life ==
Money was educated at Eton College and Trinity College, Cambridge (MA; LL.M., 1878). He was admitted to the Inner Temple in 1873, was called to the bar in 1879, and later worked as a solicitor in Surrey. Although often described as a banker, he was too interested in the arts to be a serious banker. He was at one point considered for a partnership in the firm, but this idea was abandoned, as he was thought too unstable in temperament for such a position. In any case, his preferred vocation was as an author. Adopting the pen name of "Mountjoy," he wrote and published at least 23 works between 1896 and 1923. Many of these were collections of poems (see List of works). He also worked for publisher John Lane in London, writing prefaces for, and editing, collections of poems by other authors, including Alfred, Lord Tennyson (Flowers of Parnassus, 27 volumes, 1900–1906) and Jeremy Taylor (The Marriage Ring, 1907).

== Collaboration with Albéniz ==
In the late 1880s Money-Coutts became involved with the finances of the Lyric and Prince of Wales Theatres. Through this connection he became an admirer of the music of Albéniz. Soon he became acquainted with the composer, eventually becoming an intimate friend and benefactor. They collaborated on a series of operas, for which Coutts wrote the libretti. The first opera in the series was Henry Clifford (1895), followed by Pepita Jiménez (1896), and an Arthurian trilogy, of which only one part, Merlin (1902), was completed and staged.

== List of works ==
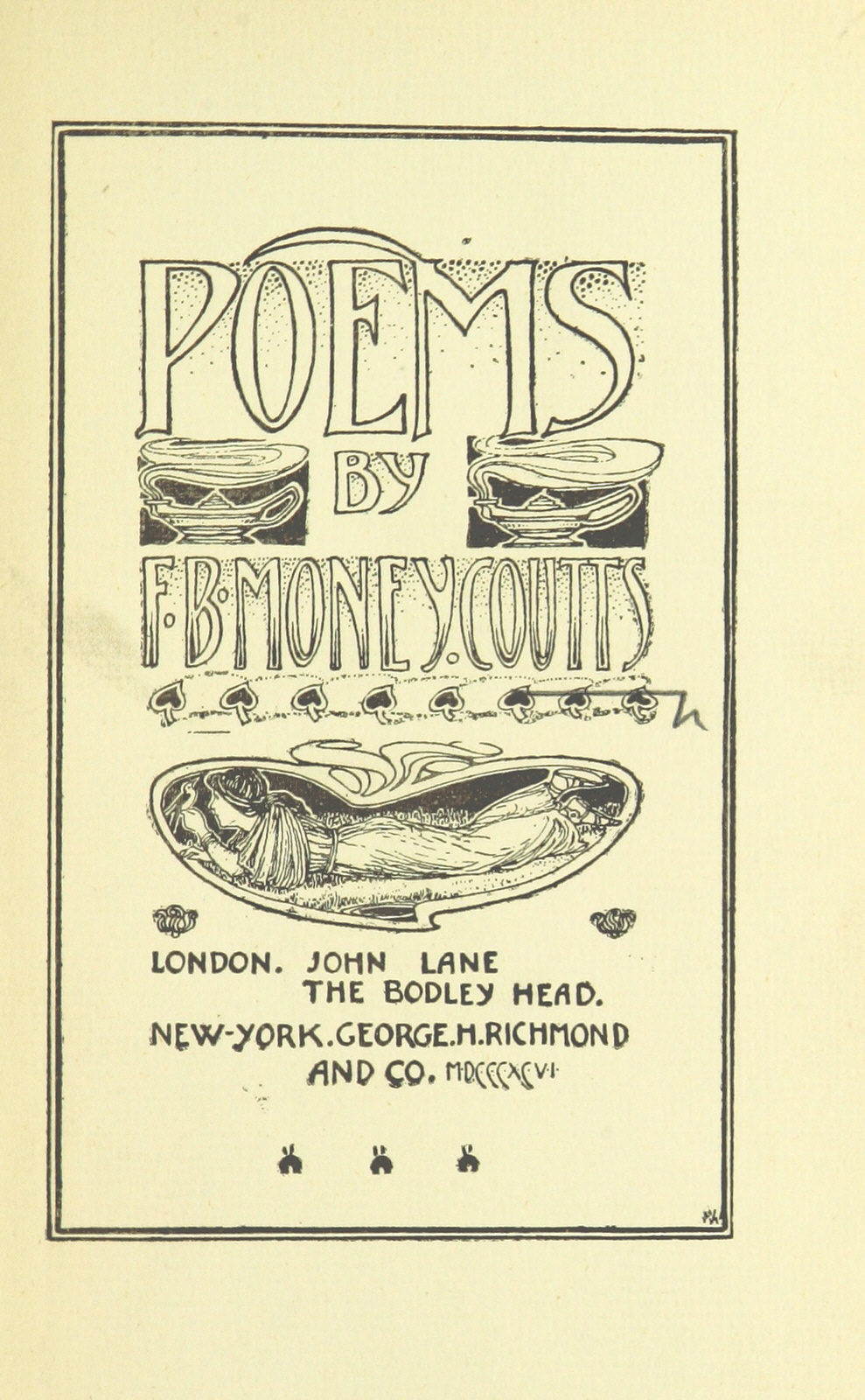
Title page of Poems (1896)

Money-Coutts authored the following works:

- Poems (1896)
- The Revelation of St. Love the Divine (1898)
- The Alhambra (1898)
- The Mystery of Godliness (1900)
- The Nutbrown Maid (1901)
- The Poet's Charter (1902)
- Musa Verticordia (1904)
- The Song of Songs: a Lyrical Folk-Play of the Ancient Hebrews Arranged in Seven Scenes (1906)
- The Heresy of Job with the Inventions of William Blake (1907)
- Romance of King Arthur (1907)
- Psyche (1911), poems
- Egypt and Other Poems (1912)
- The Royal Marines (1915)
- The Spacious Times, and Others (1920), poems
- Well (1922), a guidebook to the village of Well, Yorkshire
- Selected Poems (1923)

== Title ==
Francis Money-Coutts became the 5th Baron Latymer in 1913 when its 336-year abeyance was terminated in his favour by King George V.

Peerage of England
Preceded by John Neville (abeyant in 1577)	Baron Latymer (abeyance terminated); 1913–1923	Succeeded by Hugh Money-Coutts

== Sources ==
- Clark, Walter Aaron (1999). Isaac Albéniz: Portrait of a Romantic. Oxford, New York: Oxford University Press. ISBN 0-19-816369-X
- Kidd, Charles; David Williamson, editors (1990). Debrett's Peerage and Baronetage. New York: St Martin's Press. ISBN 978-0-333-38847-1.
