= Coutts =

British private bank

Coutts & Company

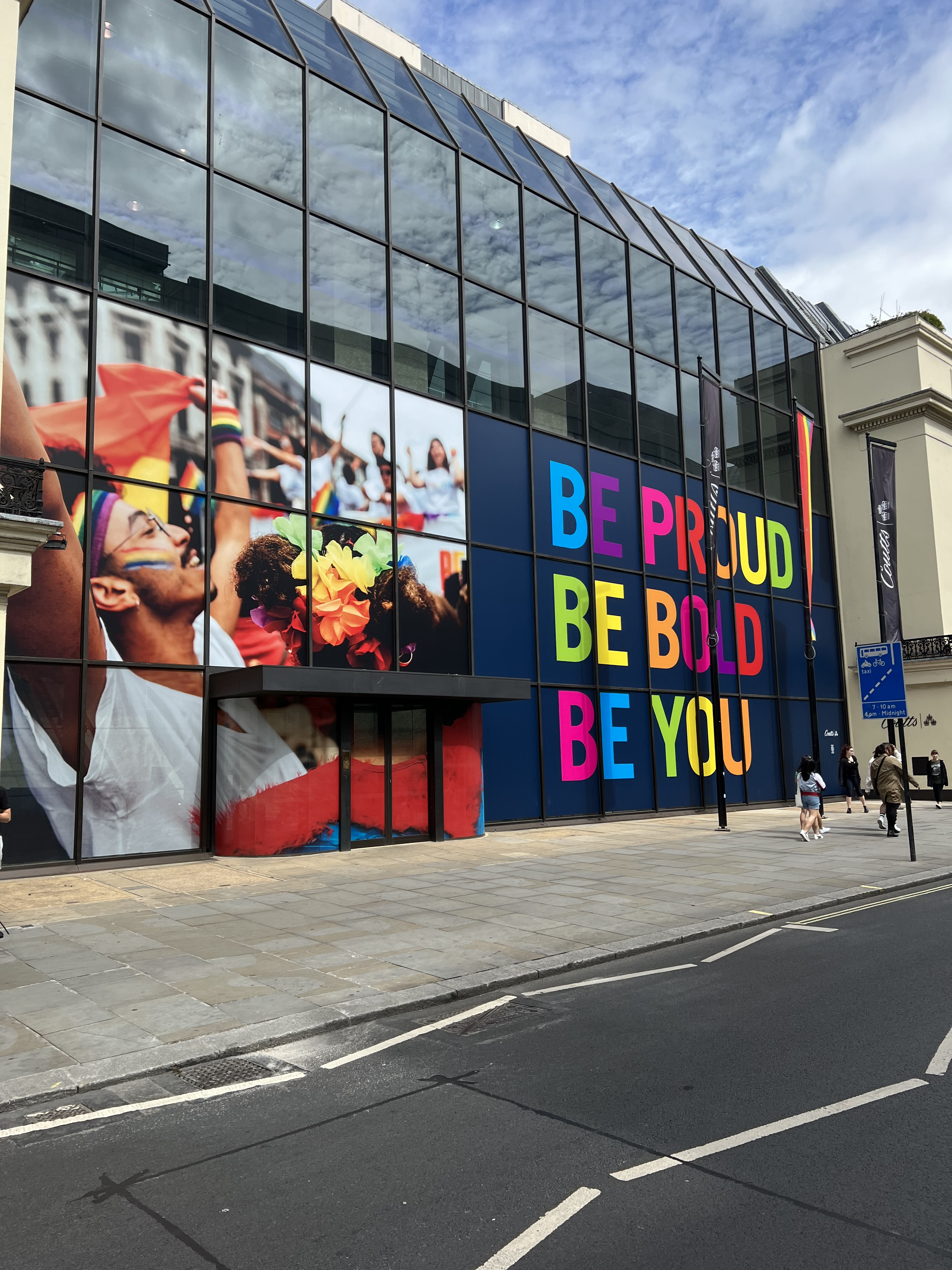
- Strand headquarters of Coutts in June 2022
- Type: Subsidiary
- Industry: Private banking and wealth management
- Founded: May 1692; 334 years ago
- Headquarters: 440 Strand, London, England, UK
- Key people: Dame Anne Richards (chair); Emma Crystal (CEO)
- Products: Wealth management – accounts, investments, lending, deposits
- Revenue: ▼£ 882 million (2024)
- Operating income: ▼£262 million (2024)
- Net income: ▼£ 194 million (2024)
- AUM: ▲£ 48.94 billion (2024)
- Total equity: ▲£ 1.497 billion (2024)
- Number of employees: 2,296 (2024)
- Parent: NatWest
- Website: coutts.com

Coutts & Company (/ˈkuːts/) is a British private bank and wealth manager headquartered in London, England.

Founded in 1692, it is the seventh oldest bank in continuous operation. Today, Coutts forms part of NatWest Group's wealth management division. In the Channel Islands and the Isle of Man, Coutts Crown Dependencies operates as a trading name of The Royal Bank of Scotland International Limited. In 2021, Coutts achieved B-Corp status, becoming only the third UK bank to achieve the certification.

== History ==
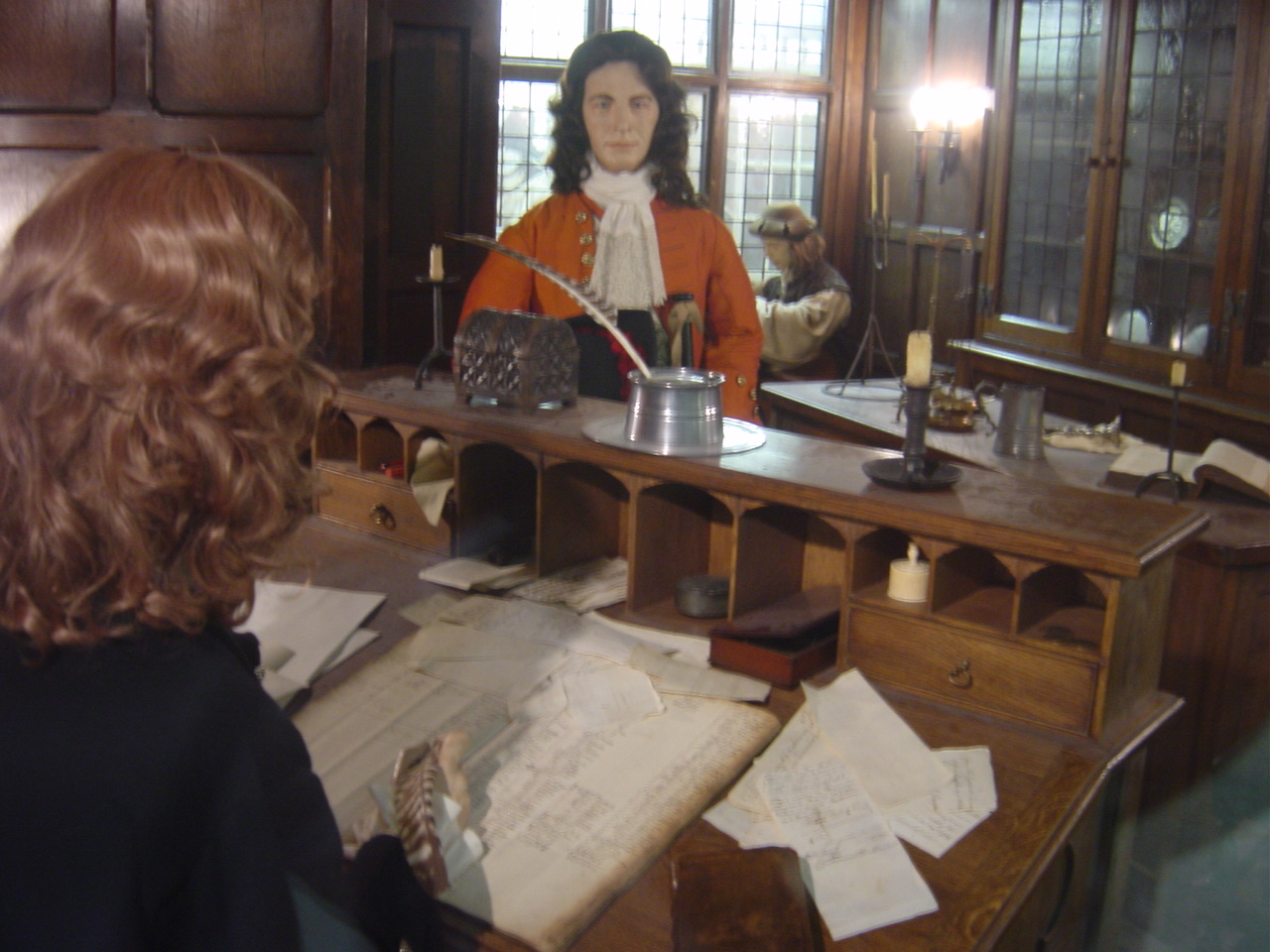
A Coutts office as it appeared in the 18th century. This mock-up is part of the archives of Coutts at their head office at 440 Strand

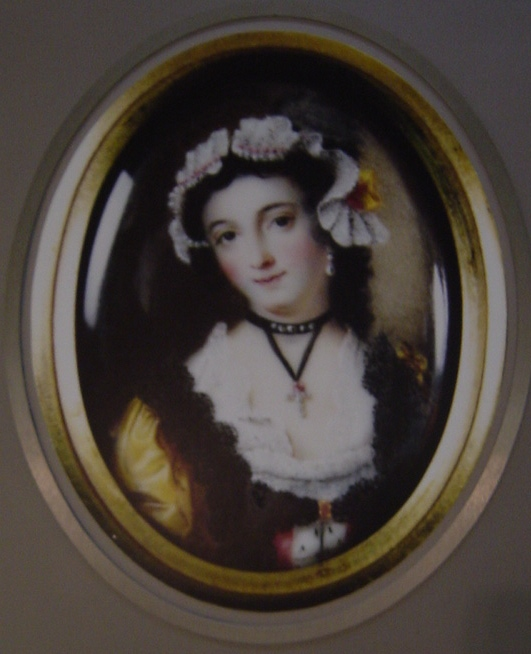
Mary Peagram, the granddaughter of John Campbell, who married James Coutts in 1755

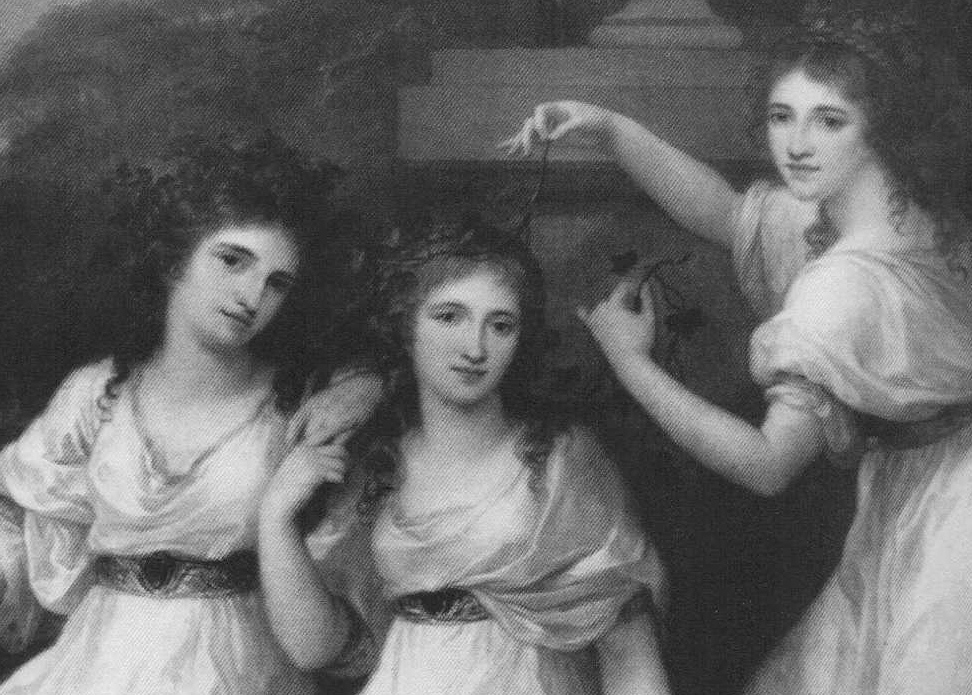
The "Three Graces", the daughters of Thomas Coutts

In 1692, a young Scots goldsmith-banker named John Campbell of Lundie, Scotland, formed the bank originally as a goldsmith-banker's shop. Lundie opened the new business in the Strand, London, under a sign of the Three Crowns, as was customary in the days before street numbers. Today, the Coutts logo still has the three crowns, and its headquarters is still on the Strand.

Campbell died in 1712, leaving the business to members of his family. The dominant force was Campbell's son in law, George Middleton, who had become Campbell's partner in 1708. During Middleton's stewardship, the bank was buffeted by one crisis after another. The Jacobite rising of 1715 threatened the stability of the banking system; and John Law, the Comptroller of France's finances, owed a great deal of money to the bank when the Mississippi Company bubble burst in 1720 and the English stock market collapsed in the same year. Stability for the bank did not return until 1735. John's son, George Campbell was also a partner, and ultimately became the sole partner after the death of Middleton in 1747, after which the bank was renamed the "Bankers of 59 Strand".

In 1755, John Campbell's granddaughter, Mary (known as "Polly"), married a merchant and banker, James Coutts. Polly was George Campbell's niece and George immediately made James a partner. The bank became known as Campbell & Coutts, with James running the business and becoming sole partner following Polly's and George's deaths in 1760. George bequeathed most of his fortune, and the bank, to James.

=== Thomas Coutts ===
In 1761 James took his brother Thomas Coutts into the business, which was now named James and Thomas Coutts.

James and Thomas did not always get on and eventually James drifted into politics, leaving the running of the bank to Thomas. James retired from the bank in 1775 due to ill health. The bank in the Strand became known as Thomas Coutts & Co.

The bank flourished under the lead of Thomas, who took in three partners: Sir Edmund Antrobus (1st Baronet), Edward Marjoribanks and Coutts Trotter. In the final decade of the 18th century, the premises at 59 Strand were significantly extended, and profits rose from £9,700 in 1775 to £72,000 in 1821. Edmund Antrobus, who started at Coutts as a clerk, was taken into partnership in 1777.

The bank on the Strand was substantially rebuilt between 1780 and 1790, employing the King's Master Mason, John Deval.

By the time Sir Antrobus died in 1826, he had been made a baronet, and he left a fortune estimated at £700,000 with newly-acquired estates at Amesbury (Wilts) and Rutherford (Roxburghshire).

Thomas Coutts married twice. His first wife, a servant named Susannah Starkie, gave him three daughters nicknamed "The Three Graces" who eventually married leading figures in British society: George North, 3rd Earl of Guilford, John Stuart, 1st Marquess of Bute and Sir Francis Burdett. Thomas also had four sons who died in infancy. When Susannah died, he remarried just four days after the funeral. Thomas Coutts was 80 years old, and his new wife, Harriot Mellon, was 40 years younger and an actress, which stirred considerable comment. On Thomas' death in 1822 the bank was renamed "Coutts & Co."

Thomas' widow, Harriot, inherited £900,000 from Thomas along with a 50% share in the bank. Although she did not get on with her stepdaughters, she wanted to keep the bank in the Coutts family. Harriot died in 1837. In her will, the Coutts fortune was passed on to Thomas' granddaughter, Angela Burdett, the daughter of Sophia Coutts and Sir Francis Burdett. The will contained three conditions: first, Angela's 50% share in the bank must be held in trust; second, the heir must take the name Coutts; and third, the heir must never marry a foreigner.

=== Angela Burdett-Coutts ===
Upon receipt of her inheritance, Angela Burdett-Coutts became the wealthiest woman in Britain. She devoted her life to philanthropy, giving away an estimated amount of between £3 million and £4 million. Her charity ranged widely: she supported the Church of England and its Anglican offshoots overseas, as well as the arts, but the main thrust of her charity was directed toward improving the lives of the poor. A sewing school in Spitalfields, cotton gins in what is now Nigeria, boats and nets for the Irish fishing industry, and ragged schools in the poorest sections of cities were but a few of her projects. Gladstone, the Prime Minister, and Queen Victoria resolved to acknowledge her philanthropic spirit formally.

In 1871, she was granted a peerage in her own right as Baroness Burdett-Coutts of Highgate and Brookfield in the County of Middlesex. In 1880, it became known that the baroness wished to marry her young American secretary William Ashmead-Bartlett, who was her junior by thirty-seven years. The partners of the bank were aghast at the prospect of such a marriage, as were many dignitaries; they saw Bartlett as an adventurer, only interested in her money. Archibald Tait, the Archbishop of Canterbury, attempted to prevent the marriage, while Queen Victoria herself, with whom the Baroness had often dined, tried to prevent what she called the "mad marriage". The Queen wrote to Lord Harrowby saying that it would grieve her much "if Lady Burdett-Coutts were to sacrifice her high reputation and her happiness by such an unsuitable marriage". This letter was passed on to Lady Burdett-Coutts, who asked Lord Harrowby to reply that he had no knowledge of the subject alluded to—quite a snub to the Queen. One potential stumbling block to the marriage was her step-grandmother's (Harriot's) will which forbade marriage to an alien. As Bartlett was an American, the marriage would cause her to be disinherited. In that event, her younger sister Clara would inherit. Angela Burdett-Coutts managed to get Clara to waive her rights. Clara's son Francis (known as Frank) was not, however, so easily dissuaded, and consulted his lawyers, thinking to forestall the marriage by standing on their rights. Finally Bartlett himself, in the face of immense pressure from society, offered to release the baroness from his offer of marriage. She, however, remained determined, refusing to release Bartlett from his promise, in spite of various scandalous accusations being made against him involving another woman, and even his fathering of an illegitimate child.

In February 1881, at the age of 67, Angela Burdett-Coutts broke the terms of the will by marrying Bartlett in Christ Church, Down Street, Piccadilly. The partners of the bank rushed to reassure the press that the heiress was neither a partner in the bank, nor could she touch the capital. An argument sprang up over the inheritance and, in particular, over whether Angela should give up the bank to her sister Clara. Angela fought back, claiming that Bartlett was only half American and therefore not technically an "alien". Clara then claimed the fortune, and the bitter dispute continued. In anticipation of victory, Clara and her son Frank took the name "Coutts", as required by the will. Finally, a compromise was struck, with the majority of the Coutts fortune set to pass to Clara and her heirs. Angela Burdett-Coutts, however, kept two-fifths of the income until her death in 1906.

The 1904 headquarters at 440 The Strand, designed by John Macvicar Anderson. It was demolished in the 1970s.

On changing her name, Clara Burdett, who had married James Money in 1850, became Clara Burdett Money-Coutts. Her son Francis' full name became Francis Burdett Thomas Nevill Money-Coutts. He was better known as Francis (or Frank) Coutts, a writer and poet. He became 5th Baron Latymer in 1913 and died in 1923.

The following appeared in Punch at the time:

Money takes the name of Coutts,
Superfluous and funny
For everyone considers Coutts,
Synonymous with Money.
—Vere Carpenter

A recession towards the end of the 19th century, known as the Panic of 1890, forced the bank to change from a partnership to an unlimited liability company in 1892. At that time, limited liability was seen by depositors as risky. As a partnership, the Coutts family would have been personally liable to any depositor for their bank deposit in a crisis, but there was no crisis. Despite this, there was little change in the organisation; the working partners were divided between managing and junior managing partners.

=== Further expansion ===
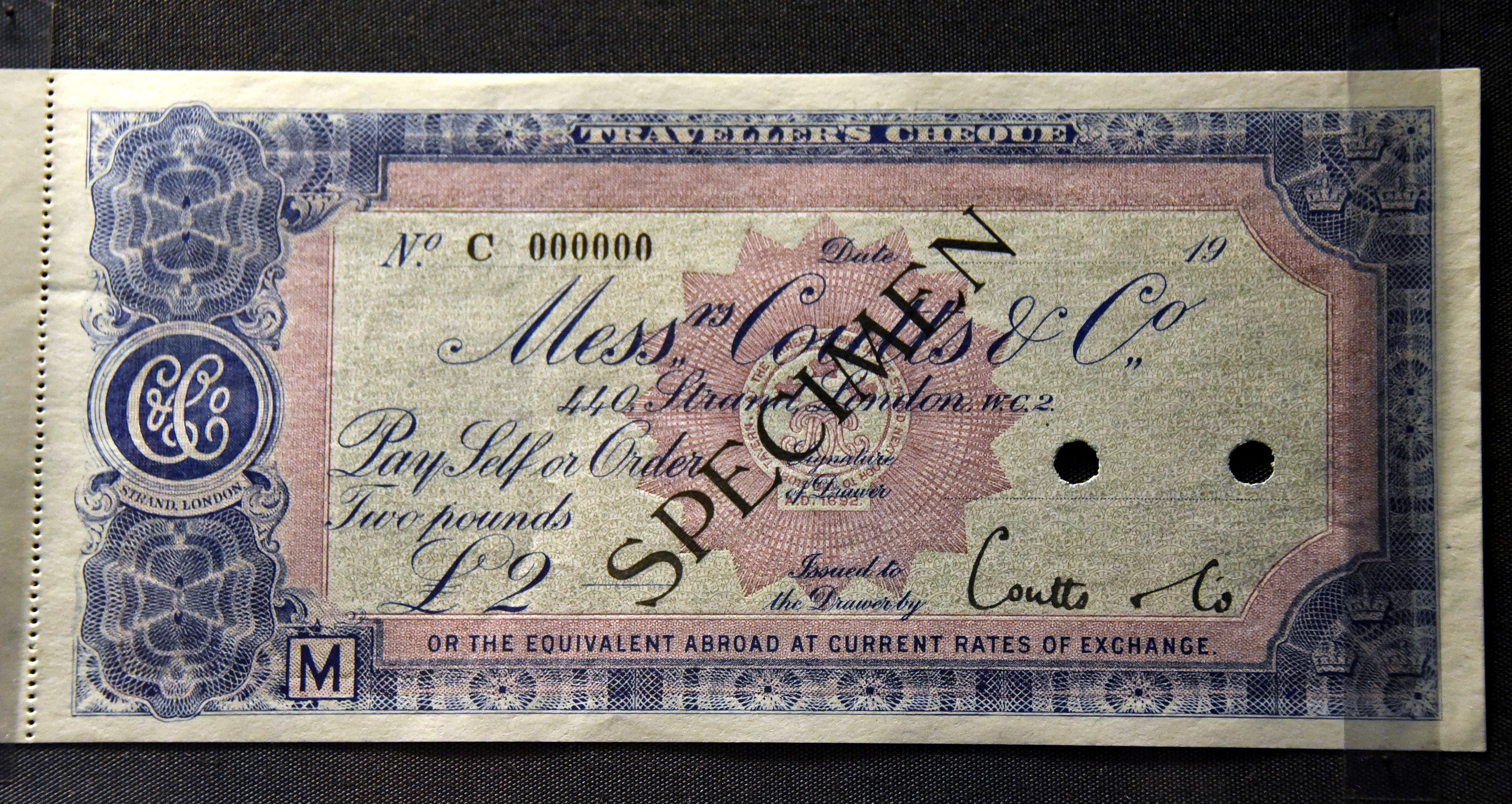
Coutts & Co. traveller's cheque, issued in London. (Langmead Collection, on display at the British Museum)

In 1904, the bank moved to its current premises at 440, The Strand. In 1914, Coutts took over the bank of Robarts, Lubbock & Co. in the city, obtaining a branch office and a clearing house seat in the process.

In 1919, Coutts merged with the National Provincial & Union Bank of England but retaining the Coutts & Co. name and board of directors.

Throughout the 20th century, Coutts opened more branches. The first West End branch outside 440 Strand was opened in 1921 in Park Lane. Further London branches were opened in the West End (1921), Cavendish Square (1927), Sloane Street (1929), Mayfair (1932), London Wall (1962), Brompton Road (1975), and Kensington (1978).

In 1961, the Bank first moved outside the capital, opening a branch at Eton, followed by a branch in Bristol in 1976.

In 1969, National Provincial Bank merged with Westminster Bank to form National Westminster Bank.

Coutts embraced modern technology, becoming one of the first banks to bring in machine-posted ledgers at the end of the 1920s. In 1963, it was the first British bank to have a fully computerised accounting system.

Between 1974 and 1978, Coutts' Strand headquarters were redeveloped by Frederick Gibberd and Partners. Francis Burdett Coutts's great grandson, Sir David Burdett Money-Coutts, became chairman in 1976, retiring in 1993, leaving his cousin Crispin Money-Coutts (heir to the title of Baron Latymer) as the last remaining Coutts name until his resignation.

Coutts gained international representation in 1987, establishing its operations in Geneva. The Coutts Group was formed in 1990, bringing together Handelsbank NatWest and NatWest International Trust to give the bank opportunities in more jurisdictions. The origins of the Swiss business can be traced to 1930, when the Bank für Industrie und Unternehmungen was founded in Zurich. This became Handelsbank in 1953, Handelsbank NatWest, upon acquisition in 1975 and Coutts Bank (Switzerland) in 1997.

=== 21st century ===
In 2000, NatWest was purchased by the Royal Bank of Scotland Group in one of the largest corporate transactions in the European banking sector. RBS Group became NatWest Group in 2020.

In 2003, Coutts Bank (Switzerland) acquired Zürich-based Bank von Ernst & Cie. Coutts Bank von Ernst became RBS Coutts Bank in 2008 to align with the parent Group and was renamed Coutts & Co. Limited in 2011. The international division was sold to Union Bancaire Privée (UBP) of Switzerland in 2015, for an undisclosed figure. This was part of the Group's strategy to reduce the number of countries it operated in, in favour of a greater focus on the United Kingdom. Coutts' business in Europe, the Middle East, Singapore and Hong Kong was to be transferred to UBP, who were required to rebrand the business.

In 2017, the bank underwent a significant reorganisation to create specialist financial teams aligned to specific services as well as the transfer of staff to bank wide centre's of excellence. The majority of these changes were unwound over the course of 2018 and 2019 due to poor staff morale in the group centres of excellence and the incompatibility of products and services between the wider bank and Coutts.

In 2018, a senior Managing Director, Harry Keogh, resigned after historic sexual harassment substantiated allegations were reported in the media. The allegations dating from 2015 had been investigated and Mr Keogh punished; he was allowed to keep his job however, due in part to his connection to the British Royal Family and his friendship with Alison Rose, who faced severe criticism internally for allowing him to remain in employment. After his departure from Coutts Mr Keogh was reported to be advising the disgraced Andrew Mountbatten-Windsor. He made an unfair dismissal claim against Coutts which was withdrawn.

In 2022, the Royal Bank of Scotland transferred its Adam and Company banking and lending business to Coutts using a banking business transfer scheme; this was following the sale of Adam and Company investment management business to Canaccord Genuity Group for £54 million announced in April 2021.

In 2023, Lord Remnant succeeded Lord Waldegrave as the Chairman of the Board. He was succeeded in September 2025 by Dame Anne Richards.

== Corporate governance ==
The company's board has been chaired by Dame Anne Richards, a former chief executive of Fidelity International, since September 2025. Coutts non-executive directors are Mark Lund, Sharmila Nebhrajani, Mark Rennison, Patrice Mcdonald and Jakob Stott.

== Locations ==
The bank's headquarters are at 440 Strand, London. It closed its Canary Wharf, St Mary Axe, Cadogan Place and Fleet Street London offices in 2013, and closed Premier Place in London in 2017.

Coutts current has a presence in 19 cities in the United Kingdom in 2025, in a large number of these offices they are co-located with NatWest colleagues. There were international offices in UAE, Switzerland, Monaco, Singapore and Hong Kong until the sale of Coutts International in 2015. Coutts retains an office in Zurich for IT, Change and certain operational staff and the continued winddown of the Coutts & Co Limited Zurich branch.

== Clients ==
Until the 20th century Coutts was a clearing bank to the nobility and landed gentry, but then became a wealth manager to a wider range of clients, including entrepreneurs, entertainers, sportsmen, professionals, executives, and lottery winners. The British royal family are notable clients; the bank was sometimes referred to as "the Queen's bank". There are stringent requirements to being accepted as a client, not just based on financial assets. In 2001 prospective clients needed at least £500,000 in disposable funds; in 2022 potential clients are asked "Are you looking to borrow £1m+?", or to use the bank's investment advisory services for assets over £1m.

== Design ==
Coutts often collaborates with British fashion designers, including previous designs for its distinctive credit and debit cards. In 2004, British fashion designer and Savile Row tailor Ozwald Boateng designed the super-premium Coutts World Charge Card, and in 2006 Stella McCartney was commissioned to design the Coutts Visa debit card. The card included a translucent Coutts logo which could only be seen if held up to the light.

In 2013, Coutts replaced its purple 'World' charge card, which had been designed by Boateng, with the new 'Silk' Charge card. The silk design was inspired by the traditional Chinese wallpaper brought back by Britain's first ambassador to China, Earl Macartney in 1794, and presented to Thomas Coutts, which lines the walls of the boardroom at the Strand headquarters.

Coutts also utilises the large glass atrium on its headquarters in London for various displays that have showcased significant events, such as the death of Queen Elizabeth II through to celebrating public & religious events as well as the annual Pride in London march which finishes in Trafalgar Square.

== Sponsorship ==
Coutts says that they "support causes and organisations that share our values and traditions".

In the early nineteenth century, Thomas Coutts became a shareholder of what became the Royal Opera House, and Coutts remains a Principal Benefactor. Coutts has been the principal sponsor of the non-commercial Royal Court Theatre, and has supported the annual London Design Festival. Coutts became the first corporate sponsor of Queer Britain in July 2020 following them being prominently featured on their annual Pride campaign in 2019.

== Controversies ==
=== Money laundering rule breaches ===
In March 2012 Coutts was fined £8.75m for breaches of money laundering rules after "serious" and "systemic" problems in handling the affairs of "politically exposed persons", customers entrusted with a prominent public function, requiring money-laundering checks. The Financial Services Authority (FSA) fined Coutts because of an "unacceptable risk" that the bank could have been handling the proceeds of crime for a three-year period up to November 2010 after failing to properly deal with "politically exposed" customers.

Following an industry-wide review in 2010, the FSA found that Coutts was not conducting robust-enough checks on such high-risk customers and was not monitoring relationships with them properly. The FSA reviewed a sample of 103 high-risk customer files, and identified deficiencies in 73 of them. The FSA's acting director of enforcement and financial crime, Tracey McDermott, said that "Coutts's failings were significant, widespread and unacceptable. Its conduct fell well below the standards we expect and the size of the financial penalty demonstrates how seriously we view its failures".

Coutts's bonus system rewarded bankers for opening accounts, providing an incentive to bring in new business without too much scrutiny, and the bank's anti-money laundering team, required to identify high-risk customers, failed to identify enough "politically exposed persons". In two cases reviewed by the FSA, bankers did not conduct appropriate checks on the customers, and failed to identify serious criminal allegations against them. There were five cases where sources had provided "adverse intelligence" such as allegations of criminal activity, but all the accounts had been approved by Coutts.

A spokesperson for Coutts said that there was no evidence that money laundering took place as a result of its deficient controls, and said that "We recognise our systems weren't totally adequate in the past and we've taken steps to improve these". Coutts would have been fined £12.5m if it had not agreed to settle at an early stage in the investigation.

=== Mis-selling of AIG fund ===
In November 2011, the Financial Services Authority (FSA) fined Coutts £6.3m for mis-selling the American International Group (AIG) Enhanced Variable Rate Fund, which invested a significant proportion of its assets in riskier asset-backed securities, between December 2003 and September 2008. The FSA required Coutts to compensate all customers who suffered a loss due to its failings in selling AIG Life Premier Bonds. A bank run started on the fund during the 2008 financial crisis.

Coutts customers had £748m invested in the fund when it was suspended in September 2008, but were only allowed to withdraw half of their investment. Many transferred the remaining 50% to a non-interest-bearing recovery fund until July 2012. The FSA said Coutts failed by giving advisers inadequate training around the risks of the product. Coutts recommended the fund to some customers even though it might have exposed them to more capital risk than they were willing to accept, and many customers were advised to invest too large a proportion of their overall assets in the fund.

Coutts agreed to settle at an early stage in exchange for a 30% discount on its fine, which would otherwise have been £9m.

=== Malaysia's 1MDB ===
During 2021 Malaysia's tainted sovereign wealth fund, 1MDB, sued Coutts & Co. for $1.03 billion claiming, "negligence, breach of contract, conspiracy to defraud/injure, and/or dishonest assistance". During 2020, Swiss authorities convicted a former Coutts & Co. banker for failing to report suspicious transactions linked to 1MDB and in 2017 Swiss markets watchdog FINMA ordered Coutts & Co to pay Swiss francs 6.5 million for breaching money-laundering regulations in its business linked to 1MDB.

=== Closure of Nigel Farage's account ===
In June 2023, former MEP and UKIP leader Nigel Farage had his personal and business accounts closed by the bank. After submitting a subject access request in July, Farage published a 40-page internal document from the bank, which contained minutes from a meeting of the bank's Wealth Reputational Risk Committee on 17 November 2022, describing Farage as a "disingenuous grifter" who promoted "xenophobic, chauvinistic and racist views", and said his "views were at odds with our position as an inclusive organisation", with "risk factors including... controversial public statements which were felt to conflict with the bank's purpose", whilst financially his account's "economic contribution is now sufficient to retain on a commercial basis”. In response, Coutts said that "Decisions to close accounts are not taken lightly and take into account a number of factors including commercial viability, reputational considerations, and legal and regulatory requirements" and that Farage "was offered alternative banking facilities with NatWest."

On 20 July 2023, Dame Alison Rose, Group CEO of NatWest Group, wrote to Farage to apologise for the contents of the Wealth Committee report. Rose repeated the bank's offer to Farage of a NatWest bank account and announced that she was commissioning a review into Coutts's processes regarding bank account closures.

The BBC's financial journalist Simon Jack had originally reported, on 4 July 2023, that the closure was for failing to meet the required minimum savings to hold a Coutts account. However, on 24 July 2023, the BBC and Jack both apologised to Farage for their coverage of this story, admitting that Jack's report was inaccurate and that Coutts' closure of Farage's account had involved considerations about his political views. On 25 July, Rose admitted to a "serious error of judgement" in discussing Farage's Coutts accounts with Jack, while the NatWest board said that it retained full confidence in her. On 26 July, Rose resigned as CEO of Natwest Group with immediate effect.

On 27 July 2023, Coutts chief executive Peter Flavel stepped down with immediate effect.

== References in culture ==
Coutts is mentioned in the 1889 Gilbert and Sullivan Savoy opera The Gondoliers in the following lyrics:

The Aristocrat who banks with Coutts—
The Aristocrat who hunts and shoots—
The Aristocrat who cleans our boots—
They all shall equal be!

Robert Louis Stevenson mentions Coutts in his 1886 classic novella Dr Jekyll and Mr Hyde as being the bank of choice for Dr Jekyll: "...and presently came back with the matter of ten pounds in gold and a cheque for the balance on Coutts's drawn payable to bearer,..."

In the first episode of Michael Palin's Around the World in 80 Days, Palin visits the bank to inquire about the safeguarding and ease of replacing money while on his trip. His bank manager suggests a code-word, which will alert a less knowledgeable member of his staff that Palin is indeed who he says he is, the code-word in question being Jabberwocky, Palin having starred in the film Jabberwocky.

In chapter three of Bram Stoker's novel Dracula, Jonathan Harker lists the recipients of several of Dracula's letters in his journal, including: "... the third was to Coutts & Co., London".

In Terry Pratchett's novel Dodger, the protagonist meets Angela Burdett-Coutts and is advised by his mentor to deposit his funds at Coutts.

== See also ==
- C. Hoare & Co
