= Merlin (Albéniz) =

Opera by Isaac Albéniz

- Opera by Isaac Albéniz
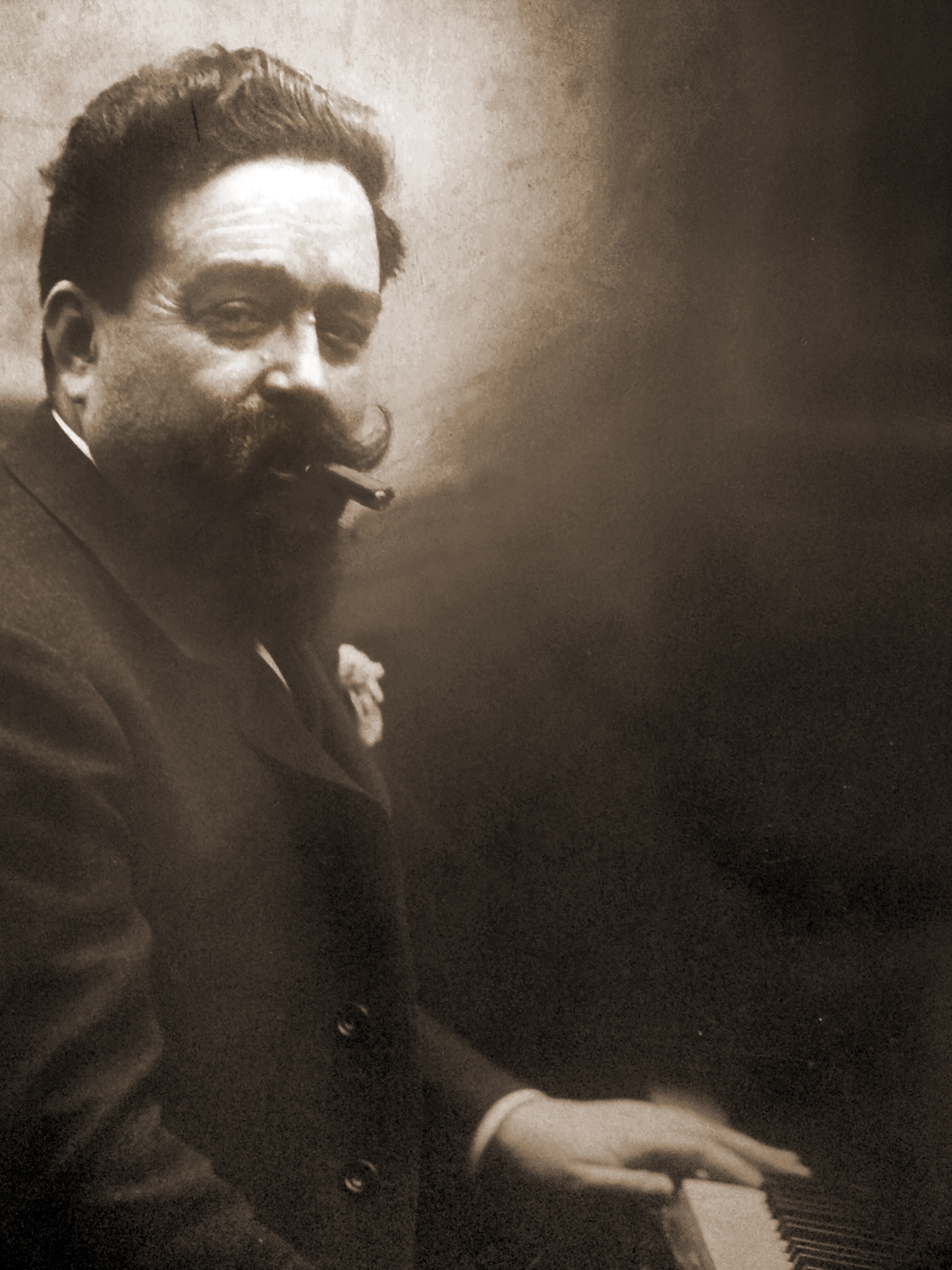
- The composer in 1901, four years after he began the opera
- Librettist: Francis Money-Coutts
- Language: English
- Based on: Le Morte d'Arthur by Thomas Malory
- Premiere: 28 May 2003; Teatro Real, Madrid

Merlin is the last of the operas of Isaac Albéniz. It is in three acts, set to a libretto written in English by Francis Money-Coutts, 5th Baron Latymer.

The opera was written between 1897 and 1902, the first of a projected trilogy of Arthurian operas commissioned by the librettist. After completing Merlin, Albéniz worked on the second part of the trilogy, Lancelot, in 1902–03, but broke off work and did not complete it before his death in 1909. He did not even begin the final part, Guinevere.

== Background ==
Albéniz is best known for his piano works, and especially for the collection Iberia, 12 piano "impressions" published in four books of three pieces each (1906, 1907, 1907, and 1908), which incorporate Spanish folk idioms into highly virtuosic piano playing with a turn in the last two books to the influence of the pianist Joaquín Malats. At the start of the 20th century, he tried very hard to establish himself as an opera composer. Living in London, he composed three operas in collaboration with Money-Coutts (heir to a banking fortune, and Albéniz's sole patron from July 1894 onward), of which Merlin was the most ambitious. It was intended as the first part of a huge trilogy of Arthurian legends, loosely based on Thomas Malory's Le Morte d'Arthur.

It has some Wagnerian influence, with several orchestral and choral interludes, and two long preludes. Money-Coutts as the librettist, under the spell of Richard Wagner, produced prose that prompted one critic, reviewing the staged premiere in 2003, to observe:

Money-Coutts's text would take pride of place in any collection of the world's worst opera librettos: it is couched in an achingly archaic Olde Englishe and relentlessly rhymed. It must be hard to sing lines like "When flow'rets of the marigold and daisy are enfolden, and wingless glowmoth stars of love englimmer all the glades" with anything approaching a straight face.

== Performance history ==
The only portion of Merlin that Albéniz heard performed with full orchestra during his life was the opening prelude. The opera was performed by vocalists with piano accompaniment in 1905, but the full score languished until a truncated version with the text translated into Spanish was staged at the Tívoli Theatre in Barcelona on 18 December 1950. The complete opera with the original English libretto was premiered in concert form at the Auditorio nacional in Madrid on 20 June 1998, and a studio recording with Plácido Domingo singing the part of King Arthur was made in 2000, conducted by Albeniz-specialist conductor José de Eusebio. The success of the recording led to the first staging in its entirety in 2003, 101 years after its completion. It was premiered in Madrid's Teatro Real, with sets and scenography, conducted by José de Eusebio and directed by John Dew. On 11 October 2011, the opera had its first production in Germany, at the Musiktheater im Revier in Gelsenkirchen.

== Roles ==
Roles, voice types, premiere cast
Role	Voice type	Premiere cast, 28 May 2003, Conductor: José de Eusebio
Merlin	baritone	David Wilson-Johnson
Morgan le Fay	mezzo-soprano	Éva Marton
King Arthur	tenor	Stuart Skelton
Nivian	dramatic soprano	Carol Vaness
Mordred	baritone	Àngel Òdena
King Lot of Orkney	bass	Víctor García Sierra
Gawain	tenor	Ángel Rodríguez
Sir Ector de Maris	bass	Juan Tomás Martínez
Sir Pellinore	baritone	Federico Gallar
Kay	tenor	Eduardo Santamaría
Archbishop of Canterbury	bass	Stephen Morscheck

== Synopsis ==
The plot is essentially a retelling of Arthurian legend with some dramatic changes for the stage, such as that Ector de Maris replaces Sir Ector as Arthur's guardian and Kay's father.

== Recordings ==
Audio

- 2000: Carlos Alvarez, Plácido Domingo, Jane Henschel, Ana María Martínez, Madrid Symphony Orchestra conducted by José de Eusebio (Decca 467 096-2)

Video

- 2003: David Wilson-Johnson, Éva Marton, Stuart Skelton, Carol Vaness, Àngel Òdena, Victor Garcia Sierra, Angel Rodriguez, Juan Tomas Martinez, Federico Gallar, Eduardo Santamaria. Madrid Symphony Orchestra conducted by José de Eusebio (2003, BBC/Opus Arte DVD OA 0888 D)
