= Fidelity International =

Fidelity Investments Non-US business

FIL Limited
- Company type: Private
- Industry: Financial services
- Founded: 1969
- Founders: Edward Johnson, III
- Headquarters: Pembroke, Bermuda
- Key people: Abigail Johnson (Chairman); Anne Richards (Vice Chairman); Keith Metters (President)
- Products: Investment management, mutual funds, ISAs, Pensions, Fund platforms
- AUM: US$1,086 billion (31 December 2025)
- Number of employees: 7,600+ (2018)
- Subsidiaries: Eight Roads Ventures
- Website: www.fidelityinternational.com

Fidelity International Ltd (FIL) is a company that provides investment management services including mutual funds, pension management and fund platforms to private and institutional investors. Fidelity International was originally established in 1969 as the international investment subsidiary of Fidelity Investments in Boston before being spun out as an independent business in 1980. Since then, it has continued to operate as a private employee-owned company.

== History ==
It was established in 1969 as an international investment subsidiary of Fidelity Management & Research, before becoming an independent business in 1980. Today, Fidelity International handles investments for clients in Europe, Canada, EMEA and Asia, while the US-based Fidelity Management and Research handles investments for clients in the USA.

In the same year that it was established, an office was opened in Tokyo, followed by London in 1973, Hong Kong in 1981 and Taipei in 1986. In 1990 the first Continental European office was opened in Amsterdam, when a number of Luxembourg funds for Continental Europe and Asia were launched. Expansion has continued, with Fidelity opening an office in India in 2001 and in China in 2004.

In 2012, then Chief Investment Officer Dominic Rossi expressed support for a UK government plan to allow shareholders to veto bonus deals for boardroom members in companies, using what The Guardian called "unusually confrontational language for a major investor more accustomed to operating behind the scenes". Rossi has since campaigned to get UK long-term incentive plans extended from three years to five.

In March 2021, Fidelity International acquired a minority stake in Moonfare as part of the company's Series B funding round. In April 2021, the two companies launched a distribution partnership focused on institutional and wholesale private market investment access in Europe. The partnership was expanded into Asia in 2022.

As of 2025, Fidelity International reported US$1.086 trillion in total client assets and operated across more than 25 locations globally.

The company is privately owned; the majority of the company is owned by its employees, though the Johnson family still owns a substantial minority of 39.89% according to regulatory filings.

== Controversial investments ==
Fidelity International has been a major investor in Hikvision and SenseTime, the former a Chinese surveillance technology manufacturer that was sanctioned in 2019 by the U.S. government for enabling human rights abuses in Xinjiang.
