= Anne Richards =

Scottish business executive (born 1964)

Dame Anne Richards DBE CVO
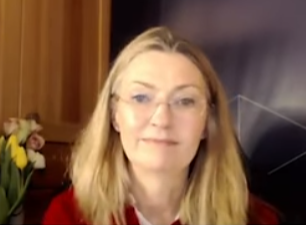
- Speaking at the 2021 World Economic Forum
- Born: Anne Helen Finnigan; 7 August 1964 (age 61); Edinburgh, UK
- Education: Royal High School, Edinburgh
- Alma mater: University of Edinburgh; INSEAD
- Occupations: Vice-Chair, Fidelity International
- Spouse: Matthew Richards (m. 1991)
- Children: 2 sons
- Awards: Dame Commander of the Order of the British Empire; Commander of the Royal Victorian Order

Dame Anne Helen Richards DBE CVO FRSE (born 7 August 1964) is a Scottish business executive who serves as Vice-Chair of the investment management company Fidelity International, having been CEO from 2018 until 2024.

Previously, Richards served as chief investment officer of Aberdeen Asset Management and chief executive officer of M&G Investments.

== Early career ==
Born in Edinburgh, Scotland, Richards was educated at the Royal High School, Edinburgh.

After graduating from the University of Edinburgh with a First-Class Honours degree (BSc) in Electronics and Electrical Engineering, Richards began her career with a research fellowship at CERN. She subsequently worked for Cambridge Consultants, before pursuing further studies in France at INSEAD graduating as MBA.

== City career ==
Richards worked initially as an analyst with Alliance Capital, before moving to JP Morgan, working in portfolio management, and then moving on to Mercury Asset Management, and later MLIM. In 2002 she took up the post of Chief Investment Officer and Joint Managing Director of Edinburgh Fund Managers plc. When EFM was taken over by Aberdeen Asset Management in 2003, Richards continued in her role as Chief Investment Officer.

It was announced in February 2016 that she would be taking over from Michael McLintock as chief executive of M&G Investments from June 2016. In July 2018, it was announced that she would leave M&G Investments, following the merger to become M&G Prudential (and subsequent demerger from Prudential UK), to join Fidelity International as chief executive officer.

In 2021, Richards led development of a range of flexible working options at Fidelity International, following the COVID-19 lockdown.

In November 2023, Richards announced her intention to step down from full-time executive life, and transitioned to the role of Vice-Chair of Fidelity International in early 2024.

== Non-executive positions ==
Richards has been chair of Coutts and Company, a subsidiary of Natwest and one of the United Kingdom's oldest private banks, since 2025. She served as Vice-Convener of the Court of the University of Edinburgh (2014–20) and is a former director of both the Esure Group plc and the Scottish Chamber Orchestra.

She is a member of the US-based Board of Leaders of 2020 Women on Boards, which works to increasing the proportion of women on corporate boards.

Richards chaired the CERN and Society Foundation Board from 2014 until 2020.

== Fellowships and honours ==
A Chartered Engineer (CEng) and a Fellow of the Chartered Institute for Securities and Investment (FCSI), in March 2016 Richards was elected a Fellow of the Royal Society of Edinburgh (FRSE), Scotland's national academy for science and letters.

Appointed Commander of the Royal Victorian Order (CVO) in 2014, then Commander of the Order of the British Empire (CBE) in 2015, she was promoted Dame Commander of the Order of the British Empire (DBE) in the 2021 Birthday Honours for "services to financial services, women, education and science".

Admitted to the freedom of the Worshipful Company of Haberdashers, Dame Anne was named on Fortune's list of Most Powerful Women in 2023.
