= Moonfare =

German private equity fund brokerage firm

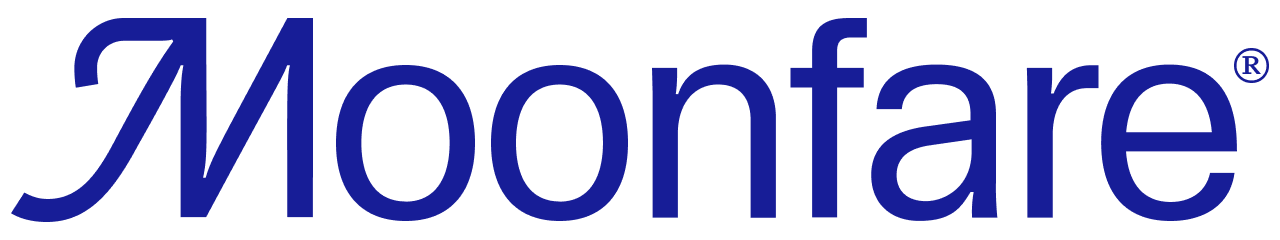
- Type: Private
- Industry: Financial services: Private Equity (2016–present)
- Founded: 2016; 10 years ago
- Founder: Dr. Steffen Pauls
- Headquarters: Berlin, Germany
- Number of locations: New York City, London, Singapore, Luxembourg, Zürich, Paris
- Key people: Dr. Steffen Pauls (Co-CEO) and Founder); Dr. Lorenz Jüngling (Co-CEO and MD); Magnus Grufman (MD); Joanna Christie (CMO); Lukas Gaertner (CTrO); Tom Hibbert (CTO); Heike Hövekamp (CCO)
- Services: Growth Equity Funds, Buyout Funds, Private Equity Funds, Venture Capital Funds, Secondaries, Semi-liquid Funds, Co-investments
- AUM: ▲€4 billion (2026)
- Number of employees: ▲200 (2026)
- Website: www.moonfare.com

Moonfare is a digital investment platform that secures allocations in private equity and venture capital funds that generally have very high minimum investments or are offered only to institutional investors. Moonfare, splits these investments into smaller tranches using feeder fund vehicles, and makes them available to investors at lower minimums. Moonfare has offered funds with minimums of £50,000 in the UK, €50,000 in Europe, and $75,000 in the US

Moonfare operates in 24 countries from its headquarters in Berlin, Germany and its offices in the UK, USA, Luxembourg, Paris, Zurich, Singapore, and Lisbon. As of 2026, the business has 200 employees and €4 billion in assets under management. [The company’s investors include Insight Partners, Fidelity International, Vitruvian Partners, Bordier & Cie, ProSiebenSat.1 Media SE’s former chief executive officer Thomas Ebeling, former KKR & Co. partner Henrik Kraft and ex-BC Partners chairman Jens Reidel.

== History ==
Moonfare was founded in 2016 by Dr. Steffen Pauls, Heinrich von Liechtenstein, and Alexander Argyros.

In 2019 Alexander Argyros withdrew from his operational responsibilities.

In January 2022, Moonfare launched its operation in the US and opened its NY office.

In April 2022, Moonfare launched operations in Singapore.

In October 2022, Moonfare launched operations in Paris and Zurich.

In September 2023, Marine Eugène joined Moonfare as Chief Commercial Officer.

In January 16, 2025, Moonfare appoints Heike Hövekamp as Chief Legal & Compliance Officer.

In March 18, 2026, Moonfare appoints Joanna Christie as its Chief Marketing Officer.

In May 2026, Moonfare Financial Services GmbH received authorisation from Germany's Federal Financial Supervisory Authority (BaFin) to operate as an investment firm under the German Investment Firm Act (WpIG), allowing the company to provide investment broking, investment advice and portfolio management under direct BaFin supervision.

Moonfare reached €500m in assets under management in 2020, €1bn in AuM in 2021, €1.5bn in AuM in March 2022, €2bn in AuM in July 2022, €3bn in AuM in June 2024, €3.7 and billion AuM in 2025. As of 2026, Moonfare reports €4 billion in assets under management.

== Funding ==
- In 2019, Moonfare raised a two part Series A round with a combined cash raise of $28m.
- In March 2021, Fidelity International, a $706bn asset manager, bought a minority stake in Moonfare in a Series B financing round.
- In November 2021, Moonfare raised another $125M (approximately €105m) round in a Series C financing round led by Insight Partners and with participation of earlier investor Fidelity International.
- In March 2022, €35m were invested led by London-based Vitruvian Partners.
- In February 2023, Moonfare raised $15m in its Series C extension round.

== Partnerships ==
- In June 2020, German bank Berenberg partnered with Moonfare to launch a private equity fund offering for its private clients.
- In March 2021, Fidelity International formed an exclusive distribution pact with Moonfare, with an agreement focusing on institutional and wholesale clients.
- In July 2021 German liability umbrella provider Fondsdepot Bank began a partnership with Moonfare.
- In December 2021, private banking house Bordier & Cie entered into a partnership with Moonfare to boost the private equity offering for its private clients.
- In January 2021, Lexington Partners, with $52bn in committed capital, participates as a buyer of stakes in Moonfare funds, providing Moonfare fund investors with liquidity potential twice each year.
- In March 2022, investment and deposit marketplace Raisin DS partnered with Moonfare to add private equity as an asset class to its platform.
- In May 2022, Fidelity International and Moonfare expanded their exclusive strategic partnership into Asia.
- In October 2023, Moonfare partnered with Quintet Private Bank to expand private-market investment access for high-net-worth clients across Europe through Moonfare’s digital investment platform.
