= Hippolyte Belhomme =

French opera singer

Hippolyte-Adolphe Belhomme, (2 December 1854, Paris - 16 January 1923) was a prominent French bass or bass-baritone and long-term member of the Opéra-Comique company in Paris. He also made some important early opera recordings, displaying on them a lyrical voice of great flexibility.

== Career ==
As a pupil of Boulanger and Ponchard he won second prize for singing and opéra comique at the Paris Conservatoire. Belhomme made his debut as Baskir in Lalla-Roukh at the Opéra-Comique on 11 November 1879; although of short stature his vocal authority was impressive.

Belhomme sang much of the repertoire for the basses chantantes at the Opéra-Comique up to June 1886 and then again from 1891 to 1916: he sang in Carmen (Escamillo and Dancaïre), Cendrillon (Pandolphe), La fille du régiment (Sulpice) Madama Butterfly (the Bonze), Mignon (Lothario), Tosca (Sacristan) and Werther (Le bailli), as well as roles in many other French and Italian operas in the Opéra-Comique repertory. Belhomme created the following roles at the Opéra-Comique:

- Mathurin in Monsieur de Floridor
- Crespel in Les contes d'Hoffmann (1881)
- Cordier in Les fugitifs
- Tripalarga in La jota
- Le bohême in Louise (1900)
- Marchande d’allumettes in Le sonneur
- Télémaque in Hémistikos
- Bustamente in La Navarraise (Paris premiere)
- Le père Vincent in Noel
- Landry in On ne badine pas avec l’amour
- Albornas in La sorcière
- Morel in Thérèse (Paris premiere)
- Un cocher in Les visitadines
- Le précepteur in Le voile de bonheur
- Un ainé in Léone

He also spent time at the opera houses of Lyon (September 1886 to May 1899) and Marseille (1889–90) before returning to the Opéra-Comique in September 1891, where he took part in Paris premieres of Falstaff and La bohème.

From 1902, Belhomme appeared each season at the Théâtre de la Monnaie in Brussels, as Osmin in Die Entführung aus dem Serail (in French) and the devil in Grisélidis in 1902, Doronte in Attendez-moi sous l'orme in 1903, the sacristan in Tosca in 1904, the vicar in Pepita Jiménez and the Duc de Longueville in La Basoche in 1905, Brander in La damnation de Faust and a soldier in The Trojans in 1906, Kezal in La fiancée vendue and a Jew in Salomé in 1907.

== Recordings ==
Belhomme sang in the complete 1911 recording of Carmen (Dancaire), the 1912 La traviata (Docteur Germont), 1912 Rigoletto (Ceprano), and the 1912 Roméo et Juliette (Gregorio). In addition, he recorded many solo arias from French operas popular during his day.
