= Dominic Rossi =

Chief investment officer

Dominic Michael Joseph Rossi is global chief investment officer of equities for Fidelity International. He was previously with Gartmore.

Rossi received his BA from the University of Sussex in 1985 and his MBA in 1993 from City University of Seattle.
