= David Money-Coutts =

English banker (1931–2012)

Sir David Burdett Money-Coutts KCVO (19 July 1931 – 25 June 2012) was an English banker, the seventh generation of the Coutts banking family. He was managing director of Coutts bank from 1970 and chairman from 1976 to 1993.

Money-Coutts was known as a reserved character with an eye for detail. He was a practical man. He was a friend of David Silsoe, second Baron Silsoe, and worshipped at the same church. He was educated at Eton and, after National Service with the 1st The Royal Dragoons, read PPE at New College, Oxford, graduating in 1954.

The surname Money came from his paternal ancestor, the Rev James Money, who had married Clara Burdett, a granddaughter of Thomas Coutts. The hyphenated Money-Coutts was adopted by James and Clara’s descendants, and in 1912 the ancient barony of Latymer was revived in favour of David’s great-grandfather, Francis Money-Coutts.

As a personal banker to the royal family, he was appointed KCVO in 1991.

Other directorships included chairmanship of the investment group M&G, deputy chairmanship of the discount house Gerrard & National and a directorship of Phoenix Assurance, Dun & Bradstreet, the credit reference agency and NatWest (from 1976 to 1990).

He was a governor of Middlesex Hospital, a member of the Kensington, Chelsea and Westminster Area Health Authority, chairman of the Medical Schools Council and a trustee of the Multiple Sclerosis Society of Great Britain.

He was chairman of the Scout Foundation and the Old Etonian Trust.

== Personal life ==
Sir David married Penelope Todd in 1958. They had two daughters, Harriet and Laura; and a son, Bim.
