= Thomas Ebeling =

German business executive (born 1959)

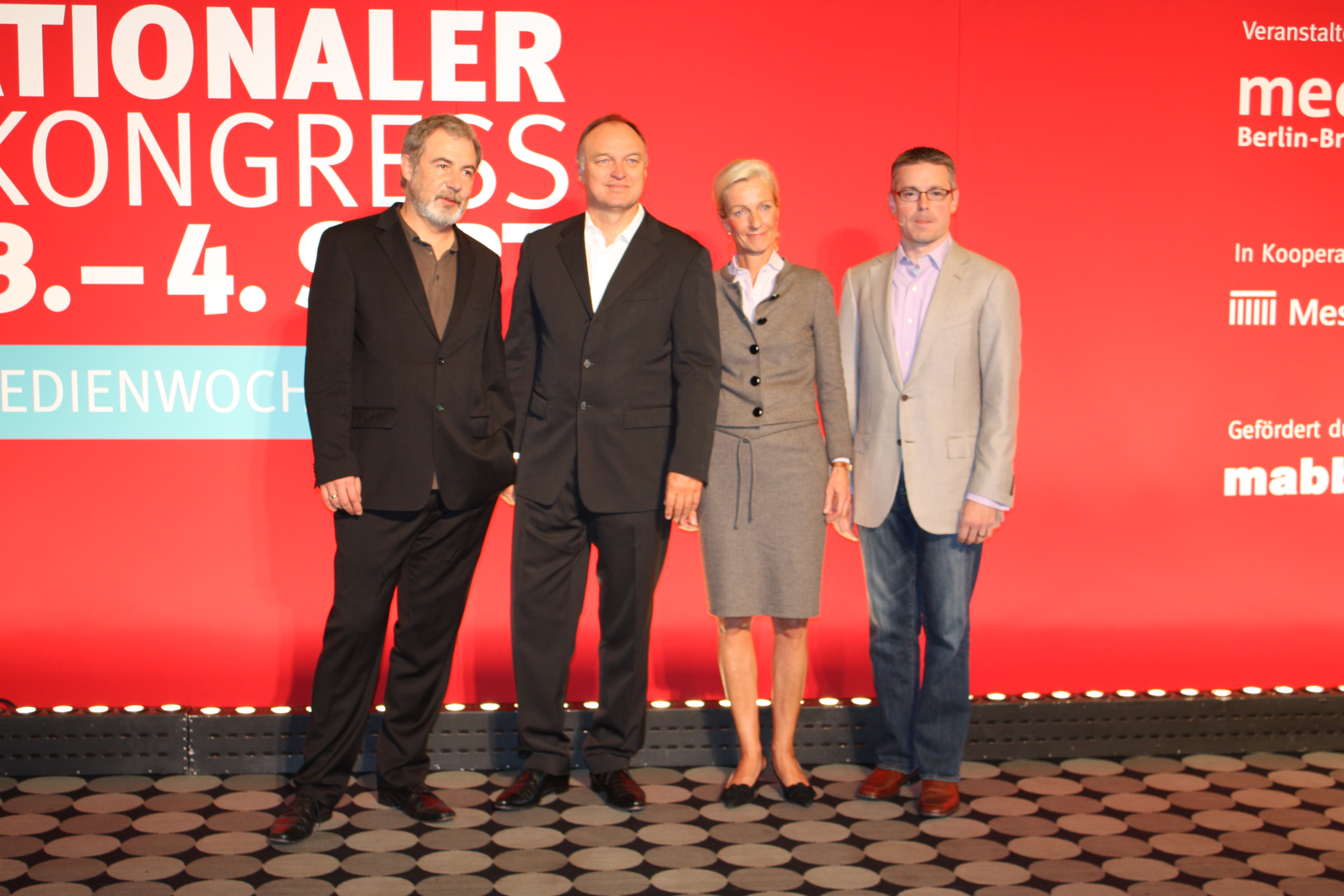
- Ebeling at the International Media Congress at the Internationale Funkausstellung Berlin 2012
- Born: February 9, 1959 (age 66); Hanover, Germany
- Education: University of Hamburg (degree in psychology)
- Known for: CEO of ProSiebenSat.1 Media, CEO of Novartis
- Spouse: Rita Ebeling

Thomas Ebeling (born February 9, 1959, in Hanover) is a German executive and the former CEO of ProSiebenSat.1 Media and Novartis.

Thomas Ebeling studied psychology in Hamburg. After graduating in 1987, he started at Reemtsma. In 1991, he switched to Pepsi-Cola Germany as a Marketing Manager. From 1994, he served as the National Sales and Franchise Director responsible for Pepsi-Cola's retail and hospitality sales. In 1996, he became General Manager of Pepsi-Cola Germany and switched to Novartis in 1997 as General Manager of Novartis Nutrition for Germany and Austria. In 1998, Ebeling took over the global leadership of Novartis's Nutrition Division. He became a member of Novartis's executive management in 1998. From 2000 to October 2007, he was responsible as Chief Executive Officer (CEO) for Novartis's global pharmaceutical business. In October 2007, he became CEO of the Novartis Consumer Health division.

Ebeling was the CEO of ProSiebenSat.1 Media from March 1, 2009, to February 22, 2018. Among other things, Ebeling increased the share value of the broadcasting group from 0.80 Euros to over 50 Euros at times and brought the media company into the DAX. At the time of his departure, the share price was 33 Euros. The manager established a diversification strategy at ProSiebenSat.1 and was the first to use the group's free advertising space to promote digital startup companies. In return, the media conglomerate received shares in sales revenues or company stakes. E-commerce companies like Flaconi and Amorelie became successful due to this strategy. From 2011 to 2016, Ebeling consistently led the corporation to new record results. Under his leadership, the company invested in the comparison portal Verivox in 2015 and entered the dating industry surprisingly in 2016 with a high investment in the ParshipMeet Group.

Although his contract term was extended prematurely to 2019 in July 2015, he left the company on February 22, 2018, after making derogatory remarks about viewers.

== Supervisory and Advisory Boards ==
From 2012 to 2019, Ebeling served as a member of the Supervisory Board of Bayer AG. Additionally, from 2013 to 2016, he held a position as a member of the Board of Directors for the Lonza Group.

From 2017 to 2022, he served as an Industry Advisor to EQT.AB and was involved in various EQT portfolio companies, including Sivantos, Apleona, and Galderma. Ebeling held the position of Chairman of the Supervisory Board at Apleona Frankfurt from 2018 to 2021. Additionally, from 2016 to 2018, he was a member and Chairman of the Supervisory Board at Sivantos Singapore.

Since 2019, Ebeling has been actively serving as the Chairman of the Advisory Committee at Galderma in Switzerland. Furthermore, since 2013, he has been providing advisory services as an Industry Partner to Rantum Management Capital GmbH for investment engagements.

Since 2016, Ebeling has been serving as an Advisor to MPM Capital in Boston. Additionally, he holds the position of Chairman of the Advisory Committee at Remagine Ventures LP in Israel. Since 2017, he has been a member and Chairman of the Supervisory Board at GFK in Nuremberg, playing a significant role in the market model of the TV industry.

In 2017, he was elected to the Supervisory Board of Cullinan in Boston. Ebeling continues to be a part of the Advisor Committee at Moonfare and is actively involved in the Supervisory Board of Heilpfanzenwohl AG in Switzerland. Furthermore, in 2021, he was appointed to the Supervisory Boards of Qiagen Netherlands and Orna in Boston, USA.

Since April 2024, he has served as Chairman of the Board of Directors of Galderma. In July 2024, he joined as a Member of the Board of Recipharm, an EQT Portfolio Company.

== Philanthropy ==
Together with his wife, Ebeling founded the Rita and Thomas Ebeling Foundation, which is dedicated to the research and treatment of oncological and cardiovascular diseases.

== Personal life ==
Ebeling currently lives with his family in Switzerland.

== Honors and awards ==
In 2011, Ebeling was chosen as the Media Man of the Year 2011.

In addition, from 2016 to 2017, he was listed among the worldwide "Top 100 - CEOs" by Harvard Business Review. In 2017, the German Manager Magazine recognized Ebeling as the CEO with the best stock performance and as one of the Top 500 Entertainment Business Leaders by the Variety Magazine.
