= Pepita Jiménez =

Opera by Isaac Albéniz

- Comic opera by Isaac Albéniz
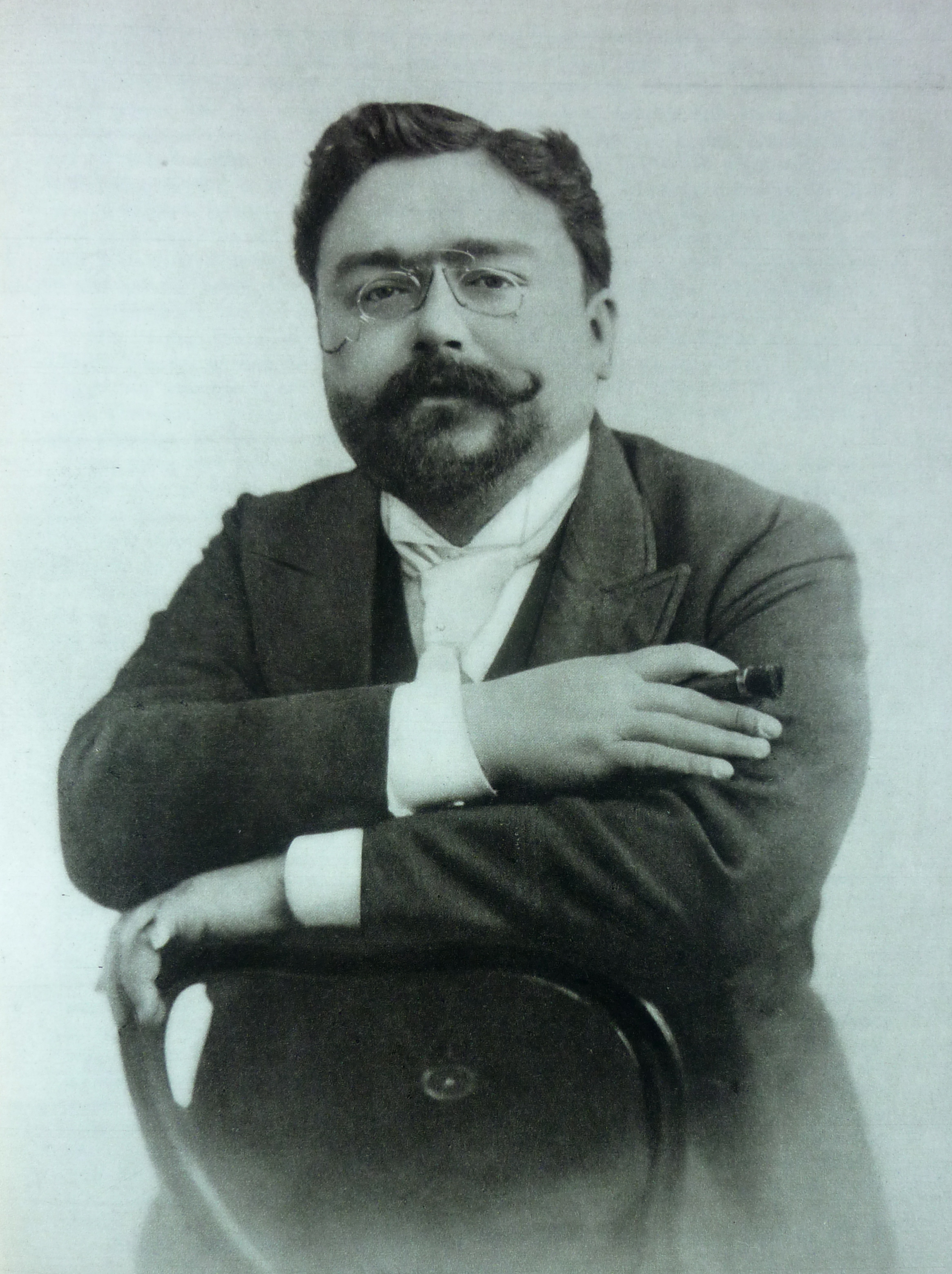
- The composer
- Librettist: Francis Money-Coutts
- Language: English
- Based on: Pepita Jiménez by Juan Valera
- Premiere: 5 January 1896 (One act, Italian); Gran Teatro del Liceo, Barcelona

Pepita Jiménez is a lyric comedy or comic opera with music written by the Spanish composer Isaac Albéniz. The original opera was written in one act and used an English libretto by Albéniz's patron and collaborator, the Englishman Francis Money-Coutts, which is based on the novel of the same name by Juan Valera. The opera was later adapted several times, first by the composer and later by others, into numerous languages and different constructs, including both a two-act version and a three-act version.

== Performance, publication, and recording history ==
The first of the composer's three versions of Pepita Jiménez was written in Paris during 1895 and performed as a one-act opera using an Italian translation of the original English libretto by Angelo Bignotti. It premiered on January 5, 1896, at the Gran Teatre del Liceu in Barcelona with Emma Zilli portraying the title role. Originally the first Pepita was to have been the Romanian soprano Hariclea Darclée, but probably because of production delays the role went to Zilli. The work was not well received in its first form and Albéniz never published this version, deciding instead to immediately revise the score.

During 1896 an expanded, two-act version was finished and, in preparation for a production at the Deutsches Landestheater in Prague, published by Breitkopf & Härtel in a German translation by Oskar Berggruen. This version, performed on 22 June 1897 under Franz Schalk, was somewhat more successful, but not enough to be revived in the following seasons.

Continuing to live in Paris, Albéniz, who was primarily a pianist, was more and more influenced by French composers, in particular Paul Dukas, who tutored him in orchestration. Thus, Albéniz again took up the opera, adding additional instruments and enriching its orchestration. This version was published by Breitkopf & Härtel in 1904. It was first performed in a French translation by Joseph de Marliave at the Théâtre Royal de la Monnaie in Brussels on January 3, 1905, under conductor Sylvain Dupuis. Albéniz died in 1909 at the age of 48 from kidney failure without further revising the opera.

Although Albéniz's 1905 version of the opera was the most successful of the three versions, subsequent productions were sporadic and infrequent, and suffered musical and plot revisions at the hands of other composers. Pablo Sorozábal, a well-known zarzuela composer, changed it into a three-act tragedy with the heroine committing suicide at the end due to a broken heart. Sorozábal’s version was performed at the Teatro de la Zarzuela in Madrid on 6 June 1964, with Pilar Lorengar as Pepita and Alfredo Kraus as Don Luis. This version was also used in the first recording starring Teresa Berganza as Pepita and released in 1967 on Columbia LPs (SCE 931/2).

A new critical edition by Borja Marino (based on the 1897 version) was premiered on 28 October 2012 at the Teatro Argentino de La Plata, Argentina, with Nicola Beller Carbone as Pepita and Enrique Ferrer as Don Luis, conducted by Manuel Coves and directed by Calixto Bieito. This was the first time that the opera has been performed on the American continent.

== Roles ==
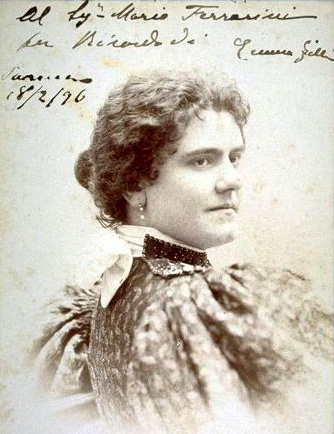
Emma Zilli who created the title role

Roles, voice types, premier cast
Role	Voice type	Premiere cast, 5 January 1896 Conductor: Vittorio Vanzo	Revised 2-act version, 3 January 1905 Conductor: Sylvain Dupuis
Pepita Jiménez, a young widow	soprano	Emma Zilli (or Zilly)	Mme Baux
Don Luis de Vargas, a young theological student	tenor	Oreste Gennari (or Genaro)	M. David
Antoñona, her serving woman	mezzo-soprano	Carlotta Calvi-Calvi	Jeanne Maubourg
Don Pedro de Vargas, father of Luis	baritone	Marco Barba	Pierre d'Assy
Vicar	bass	Oreste Luppi	Hippolyte Belhomme
Count Genazahar, a gay young officer	baritone	Achille Tisseyre	Alexis Boyer
1st Officer	tenor	Antonio Oliver	Armand Crabbé
2nd Officer	baritone	Alfredo Serazzi	M. Lubet

== Synopsis ==
- Time: Mid-19th century
- Setting: A village in Andalusia

The story opens on a day in May celebrating the feast of the Infant Saviour. Pepita Jiménez, a 19-year-old girl, has recently been widowed. She had been married to her 80-year-old uncle Don Gumersindo, a rich money-lender, since she was 16 and is now in possession of his large fortune. Pepita is sought by many suitors, including Count Genazahar, who owes her money, and Don Pedro de Vargas, a highly respected and prosperous member of the community. Pepita, however, has eyes only for Don Pedro's son, Don Luis, a handsome young seminarian who flirts with her shamelessly. She confesses her love to the town's vicar, and he in turn urges her to forget about him as he is supposed to pursue a higher calling.

Meanwhile, Pepita's feisty but loving maid, Antoñona, reveals to Don Pedro her mistress's love for his son, while simultaneously chiding him for raising such a flirt. Though at first surprised by this revelation, Don Pedro swallows his own feelings for Pepita and decides to help along the young couple's romance with the aid of Antoñona. Pepita returns from her meeting with the vicar and meets Don Luis, whom she has resolved to bid follow his vocation. Likewise, Don Luis has by now realised that he loves Pepita, but resolves to resist temptation. Just as the two are about to part forever, Antoñona interrupts and makes Don Luis promise to see Pepita once more before he departs town.

After leaving Pepita, Don Luis overhears Count Genazahar, who has been recently rebuffed by Pepita, making insulting remarks about her to two officers. Luis becomes incredibly angry and he challenges the count to a duel. The count is wounded in the fight and Luis is victorious. When Don Luis again sees Pepita, she cannot keep in her true feelings. Frantic, she informs him that her life will be forfeit for his calling, and she locks herself in her room. Don Luis, fearing her suicide, breaks into Pepita's room and the two unite in an embrace to the happiness of Antoñona.

== Musical analysis ==
In an essay accompanying the 2006 recording, Walter Aaron Clark, writes:

In Pepita Jiménez, Albéniz sought to create Spanish national opera through an amalgamation of three major trends in contemporary musical theater: use of regional folkloric elements, a practice borrowed from zarzuela; a Pucciniesque lyricism in which the orchestra frequently reinforces the voice; and Wagnerian musico-dramatic innovations, including continuous musical commentary in the orchestra infused with musical references to places and people in the manner of Leitmotiv.

Albéniz's music utilizes striking rhythms and decorative chromatic melodic figures which are reminiscent of Andalusian folk music. His music is lyrical and the "appealing vocal lines slip in and out of a full orchestral texture that continually animates the work". To depict the feast day, Albéniz used both an opera chorus and a children’s chorus. He also incorporated a significant amount of dance music into the feast scenes of the opera.

== Recording ==
The Spanish musicologist and conductor José de Eusebio has assembled and recorded a critical edition of Albéniz's 1905 version. The Penguin Guide writes about this recording that the opera's "many attractive qualities are clear. ...the writing in a gently Spanish idiom has plenty of colour in the orchestration. ... Vivid sound."

Albéniz: Pepita Jiménez – Orquesta y Coro de la Comunidad de Madrid

- Conductor: José de Eusebio
- Principal singers: Carol Vaness (Pepita Jiménez), Plácido Domingo (Don Luis de Vargas), Jane Henschel (Antoñona), Enrique Baquerizo (Don Pedro de Vargas), Carlos Chausson (Vicar), José Antonio López (Count Genazahar) Ángel Rodríguez (1st Officer), Federico Gallar (2nd Officer)
- Recording location and date: Teatro Bulevar, Torrelodones, Madrid, July 2004 and June 2005
- Label: Deutsche Grammophon – 000747202 (CD)

== Sources ==
- Casaglia, Gherardo (2005). "Pepita Jiménez". L'Almanacco di Gherardo Casaglia (in Italian).
- Clark, Walter Aaron (1999), Isaac Albéniz: Portrait of a Romantic, Oxford, New York: Oxford University Press, ISBN 019816369X
- Barulich, Frances. "Pepita Jiménez". In L. Macy (ed.). Grove Music Online. (subscription required)
- The Penguin Guide to Recorded Classical Music, Penguin Books, 2008, ISBN 978-0-14-103336-5
- Pepita Jiménez, CD recording and booklet released in 2006 (DG 477 6234) with José de Eusebio conducting the Orquesta y Coro de la Comunidad de Madrid.
