= Naomi and Ruth =

The cantata Naomi and Ruth, Op. 27, is a nonliturgical work, written by Mario Castelnuovo-Tedesco in 1947.

It is subtitled "small cantata for woman's voice on the book of Ruth" and its text is in English. The composer described the work as autobiographical with the soprano, Naomi, representing his mother and the choir, Ruth, his wife. The work is representative of the Judaic inspiration of the composer.

The first performance took place in Los Angeles in 1949. Performance lasts approximately ten minutes.
