= Àngel Òdena =

Spanish operatic baritone

Àngel Òdena is a Spanish operatic baritone.

== Biography ==
Born in Tarragona, Spain, he has a degree in Geography and History. He started studying singing and piano in his native town with Mercè Obiol and Dolors Aldea, and continued his studies at the Accademia Lirica in Mantua with Katia Ricciarelli and later with Eduardo Giménez. His debut was in 1994 in La Bohème, at the Teatro Petruzzelli in Bari.

== Repertory ==
Repertoire
Role	Title	Composer
Riccardo	I puritani	Bellini
Ernesto	Il pirata	Bellini
Escamillo	Carmen	Bizet
Enrico	Lucia di Lammermoor	Donizetti
Belcore	L'elisir d'amore	Donizetti
Malatesta	Don Pasquale	Donizetti
Nottingham	Roberto Devereux	Donizetti
Alonso	La favorita	Donizetti
Athandel	Thaïs	Massenet
Guglielmo	Così fan tutte	Mozart
Il Conte	Le nozze di Figaro	Mozart
Don Giovanni	Don Giovanni	Mozart
Sharpless	Madama Butterfly	Puccini
Marcello	La bohème	Puccini
Lescaut	Manon Lescaut	Puccini
Guglielmo	Le villi	Puccini
Figaro	Il barbiere di Siviglia	Rossini
Dandini	La Cenerentola	Rossini
Taddeo	L'italiana in Algeri	Rossini
Le grand pretre	Samson et Dalila	Saint-Saëns
Don Carlo di Vargas	La forza del destino	Verdi
Nabucco	Nabucco	Verdi
Rigoletto	Rigoletto	Verdi
Il conte di Luna	Il trovatore	Verdi
Renato	Un ballo in maschera	Verdi
Giorgio Germont	La traviata	Verdi
Macbeth	Macbeth	Verdi
Amonasro	Aida	Verdi
Sir John Falstaff	Falstaff	Verdi
Simon Boccanegra	Simon Boccanegra	Verdi
Rodrigo	Don Carlos	Verdi
Herrufer	Lohengrin	Wagner
Wolfram	Tannhäuser	Wagner
Kurvenal	Tristan und Isolde	Wagner
Il conte Gil	Il segreto di Susanna	Wolf Ferrari
Silvio Prologo	Pagliacci	Leoncavallo

=== Zarzuela ===
- Luisa Fernanda
- Katiuska
- La de Manojo de Mosas
- Pan y toros
- La del Soto del Parral
- La revoltosa

=== Spanish Opera ===
- Merlín
- Margarita la Tornera
- La Dolores
- Atlantida
- Una voce in off
- El gato con botas

== Sources ==
- Albesa, Isaac "Àngel Òdena debutará en Verona" (in Spanish), Diari de Tarragona, 28 June 2009
- Diputació de Tarragona, El baríton Àngel Òdena, investit conciliari d'honor al Palau de la Diputació (in Catalan), 20 October 2008
- Gonzalez, Angel, Angel Odena Barítono: «Debes llevar la música de Wagner a tu terreno» (in Spanish), La Voz de Asturias 8 October 2005
