= Emma Zilli =

Italian singer

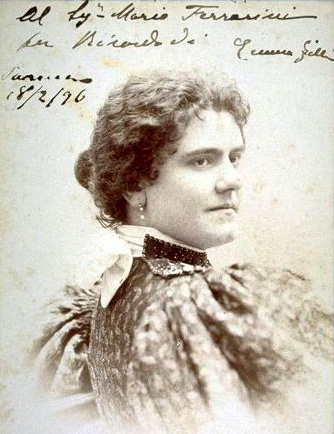
Emma Zilli in 1896

Emma Zilli (pronounced [ˈɛmma dˈdzilli]; 11 November 1864 – January 1901) was an Italian soprano, possibly best known for creating the role of Alice in Verdi's Falstaff in 1893.

== Life ==
Zilli was born in Fagagna, Udine. She was trained as a pianist and began singing only after her marriage to the painter Giacomo Zilli, in 1882. She made her stage debut in 1887 at Ferrara as Paolina in Donizetti's Poliuto and in 1889 first sang at La Scala, Milan, as Camille in Hérold's Zampa. In the same house she created the role of Alice Ford in Verdi's Falstaff (1893), and made her Covent Garden debut in the same role in the British premiere of the opera (1894).

Zilli was a powerful singing actress, though her voice had a prominent vibrato not to everyone's taste. Her favourite roles included Puccini's Manon Lescaut and Fidelia in his Edgar.

At the height of her career Zilli caught yellow fever while performing in South America and died in Havana, Cuba.
