= Carlos Álvarez (baritone) =

Spanish baritone (born 1966)

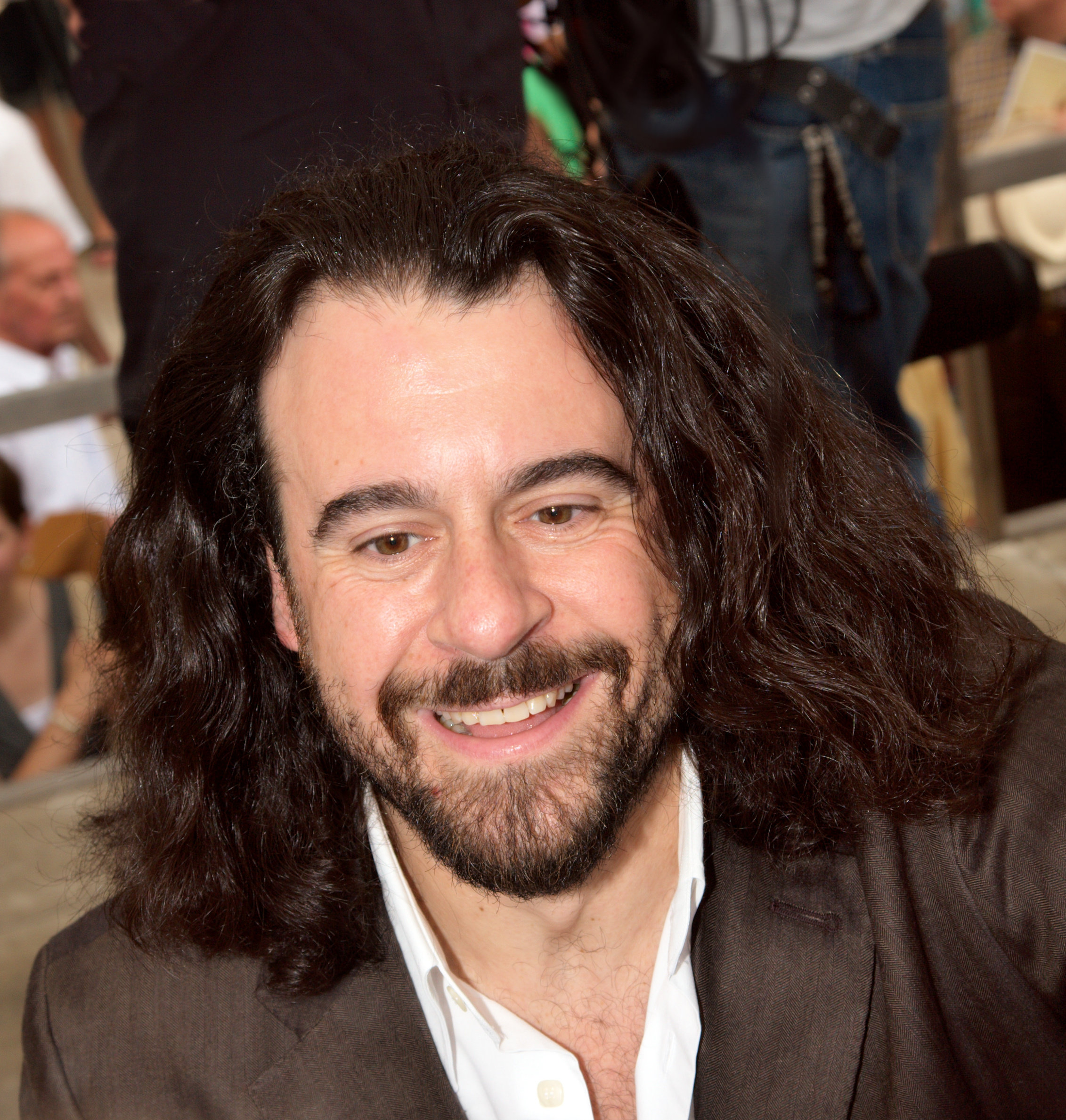
Álvarez in 2008

Carlos Álvarez (born 1966 in Málaga) is a Spanish baritone who has had an international opera career since the early 1990s. His recording of the title role in Isaac Albéniz's Merlin with Plácido Domingo as King Arthur won a Latin Grammy Award in 2001, and his recording of the role of Ford in Giuseppe Verdi's Falstaff won the Grammy Award for Best Opera Recording in 2006.

== Career ==
Álvarez made his stage debut at Madrid's Teatro de la Zarzuela in 1990 in a production of Pablo Sorozábal's La del manojo de rosas. Since then he has appeared in leading roles on the stages of opera houses, including La Scala, the Royal Opera, London, Opéra Bastille, the Liceu, the Palau de les Arts Reina Sofía, the Teatro Real, the Bavarian State Opera, the Hamburg State Opera, the Vienna State Opera, the Lyric Opera of Chicago, the Washington National Opera, and Zurich Opera.

Some of the roles he has performed on stage are Alfonso XI of Castile in La favorite, Don Carlo in Ernani, Don Carlo di Vargas in La forza del destino, the Duke of Nottingham in Roberto Devereux, Escamillo in Carmen, Figaro in The Barber of Seville, Gérard in Andrea Chénier, Iago in Otello, Marc Antoine in Jules Massenet's Cléopâtre, Rodrigo in Don Carlos, Roque in Emilio Arrieta's Marina, and the title roles in Don Giovanni, The Marriage of Figaro, and Simon Boccanegra.

In 1996 Álvarez made his debut at the Metropolitan Opera as Germont in La traviata with Victoria Loukianetz as Violetta, Marcello Giordani as Alfredo, and Plácido Domingo conducting. He has returned to the Met several times in Verdi operas, singing the Count Di Luna in Il trovatore opposite Sondra Radvanovsky as Leonora (2002), Renato to Aprile Millo's Amelia in Un ballo in maschera (2005), the Miller to Veronica Villarroel's Luisa in Luisa Miller (2006), and the title roles in Rigoletto (2006) and Macbeth (2008). In 2003, he received Spain's Premio Nacional de Música for interpretation.

Álvarez was scheduled to sing Don Carlo di Vargas and Simon Boccanegra at the Vienna State Opera, Ford at the Teatro dell'Opera di Roma, Ezio in Attila at the Metropolitan Opera, Boccanegra at both La Scala and Madrid's Teatro Real, and the title role in Ambroise Thomas's Hamlet at the Washington National Opera in 2010, he withdrew from several of those engagements (including Attila, Hamlet, and Simon Boccanegra in Madrid). Álvarez sang Iago in Otello for the Royal Opera in December 2019.
