= José de Eusebio =

Spanish musician

José de Eusebio (born 1966, Madrid) is a Spanish conductor and musicologist. He is particularly known for his work on the neglected operas of the Spanish composer Isaac Albéniz.

== Life and career ==
De Eusebio initially trained as a pianist and conductor in Spain with further courses at the Franz Liszt Academy of Music and the Mozarteum University of Salzburg. Amongst his teachers were György Kurtág and Vlado Perlemuter. De Eusebio also studied in the United States as a Fulbright Scholar in Dallas with Joaquín Achúcarro (piano), and conducting.

He served as music director of contemporary music Sax-Ensemble between 1997 and 2002 and has guest conducted all the major Spanish orchestras, including the Spanish National Orchestra, Madrid Symphony Orchestra, Community of Madrid Orchestra, Valencia Orchestra, Málaga Philharmonic, Royal Seville Symphony Orchestra, and the Queen Sofía Chamber Orchestra. He has conducted throughout Europe as well as in North and South America and in Asia.

A specialist in the operatic works of Isaac Albéniz, Eusebio is the editor of the critical editions of the scores for Merlin, Henry Clifford, Pepita Jiménez and San Antonio de la Florida. He conducted the world première of Merlin in its first complete staging (27 May 2003, Teatro Real, Madrid). His earlier recording of the work received the 2001 Latin Grammy Award for Best Classical Recording and his recording of Pepita Jiménez was nominated for a Grammy Award in 2007 for Best Opera Recording. On 24 January 2009, he conducted the world premiere performance of Henry Clifford with its original English libretto (Auditorio Alfredo Kraus, Las Palmas de Gran Canaria).

He was one of the classical musicians, and the only Spaniard, who performed in LA at the America: A Tribute to Heroes after the September 11 attacks.

== Selected recordings ==
Albéniz: Henry Clifford - Orquesta Sinfonica de Madrid

- Conductor: José de Eusebio
- Principal singers: Aquiles Machado (Henry Clifford); Alessandra Marc (Lady Clifford); Carlos Álvarez (Sir John Saint John); Jane Henschel (Lady Saint John); Ana Maria Martínez (Annie Saint John); Christian Immler (Colin); Ángel Rodríguez (Messenger).
- Recording location & date: Auditorio Nacional de Música de Madrid, 19–27 July 2002
- Label: Decca - 473 937-2 (2 CDs)

Albéniz: Pepita Jiménez - Orquesta y Coro de la Comunidad de Madrid

- Conductor: José de Eusebio
- Principal singers: Carol Vaness (Pepita Jiménez), Plácido Domingo (Don Luis de Vargas), Jane Henschel (Antoñona), Enrique Baquerizo (Don Pedro de Vargas), Carlos Chausson (Vicar), José Antonio López (Count Genazahar) Ángel Rodríguez (1st Officer), Federico Gallar (2nd Officer)
- Recording location & date: Teatro Bulevar, Torrelodones, Madrid, July 2004 and June 2005
- Label: Deutsche Grammophon - 000747202 (CD)

Albéniz: Merlin - Orquesta Sinfonica de Madrid

- Conductor: José de Eusebio
- Principal singers: Carlos Alvarez (Merlin), Plácido Domingo (King Arthur), Jane Henschel (Morgan le Fay), Ana Maria Martinez (Nivian), Carlos Chausson (Archbishop of Canterbury ), Christopher Maltman (Mordred)
- Recording location & date: Auditorio Nacional de Madrid, 1999
- Label: Decca - 467096 (2 CDs)
