= Jane Henschel =

American operatic mezzo soprano (born 1952)

Jane Henschel (born 2 March 1952) is an American operatic mezzo soprano. Henschel, who was born in Wisconsin, studied at the University of Southern California to initially get a degree in Civil engineering, and then pursued further studies in Germany, where she has made her home. Her numerous opera appearances include Baba the Turk in Igor Stravinsky's The Rake’s Progress with Glyndebourne Festival Opera, the Saito Kinen Festival Matsumoto, and the Salzburg festival; Brangäne in Richard Wagner's Tristan und Isolde with Paris Opéra and the Los Angeles Opera; the Principessa in Giacomo Puccini's Suor Angelica with conductor Riccardo Chailly and the Royal Concertgebouw Orchestra; Blanche de la Force in Francis Poulenc's Dialogues des Carmélites in Amsterdam; Kostelnicka Buryjovka in Leoš Janáček's Jenůfa under Seiji Ozawa in Japan; and the Kabanicka in Janáček’s Katya Kabanova at the Salzburg Festival among others.

She is perhaps best known for her portrayal of The Nurse in Richard Strauss's Die Frau ohne Schatten which she has sung in Amsterdam, London, Los Angeles, Munich, Paris, Vienna, Berlin, Tokyo and at the Metropolitan Opera. Not a stranger to the concert repertoire, Henschel has sung with numerous orchestras throughout the world, including the Berlin Philharmonic, the London Symphony, the BBC Symphony Orchestra, the Orchestre de la Suisse Romande, the Orchestre Philharmonique de Radio France, the New York Philharmonic, and the Philadelphia Orchestra to name just a few.

Henschel sang the role of Brangaene in Wagner's Tristan und Isolde. The opera originally cited, Die Walkuere, does not have the role of Brangaene, which is scored for mezzo-soprano.

Henschel can be heard on more than a dozen recordings, including Isaac Albéniz's Merlin with Plácido Domingo, which won a 2001 Grammy Award, and Engelbert Humperdinck's Hänsel und Gretel, which won a 2008 Grammy Award.
