= Bolero (Spanish dance) =

Spanish folk dance and music

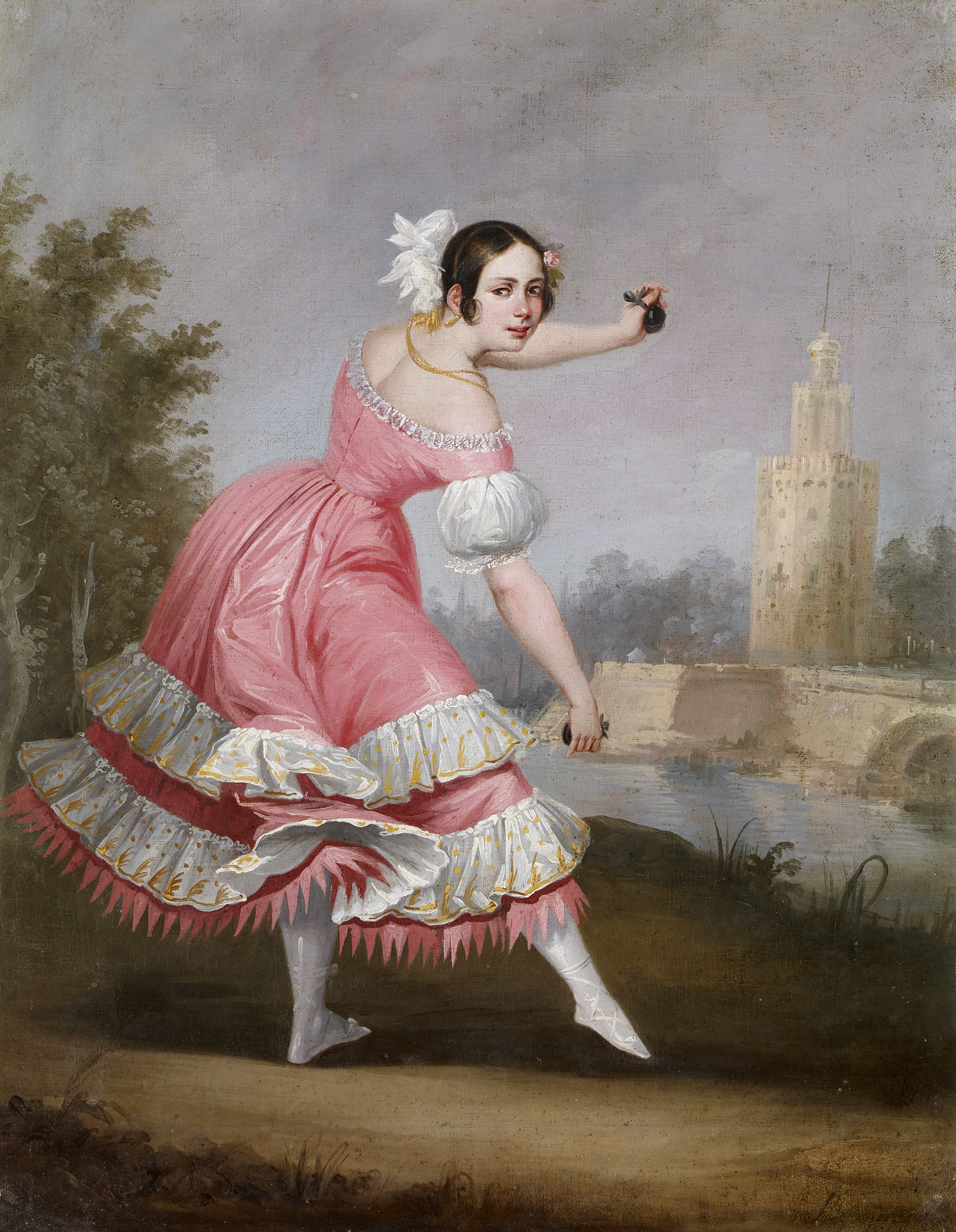
A bolero dancer by Antonio Cabral Bejarano, 1842

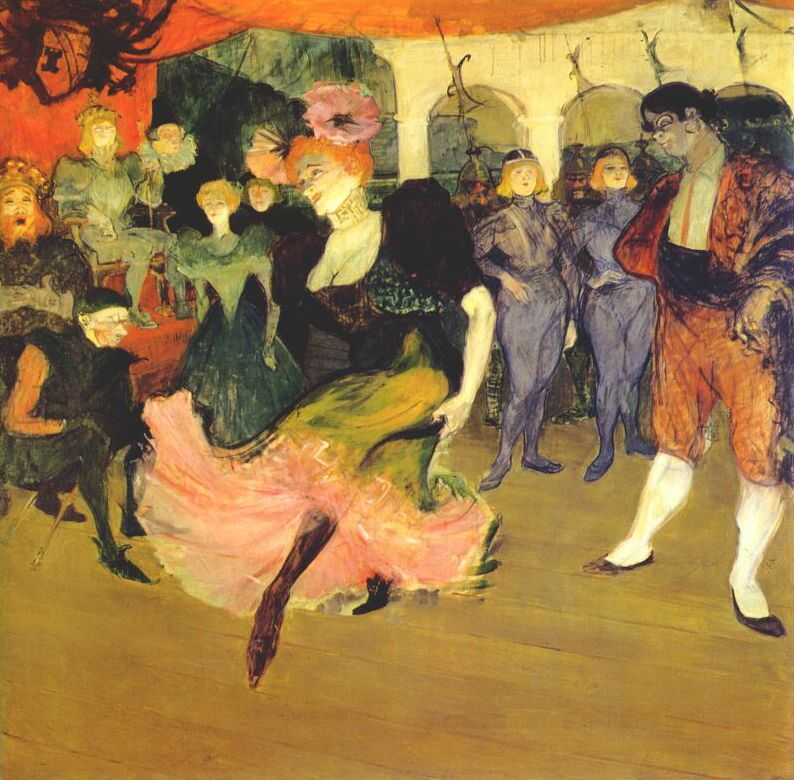
Marcelle Lender dancing the Bolero in "Chilperic", by Toulouse-Lautrec - Hervé, 1895

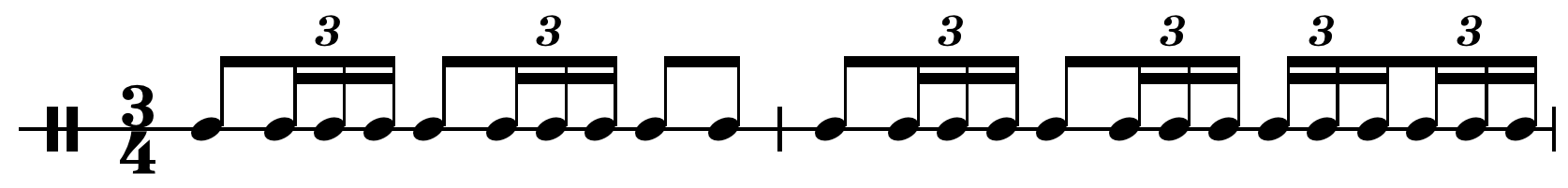
Bolero rhythm

Bolero is a Spanish dance in 3/4 time popular in the late 18th and early 19th centuries. It originated from the seguidilla sometime between 1750 and 1772, and it became very popular in Madrid, La Mancha, Andalusia and Murcia in the 1780s. Bolero was performed as a solo or partner dance with a moderately slow tempo, accompanied by guitar and castanets, and with lyrics in the form of the seguidilla.

Sebastián Cerezo was credited by as one of the earliest and best dancers of the genre. According to Zamácola y Ocerín, Cerezo danced slowly and his particular way of dancing marked the definitive transition from seguidilla to bolero (from voleo, cf. vuelo, "flight"). This original slow way of dancing was promoted by Murcian dancer Requejo around 1800 in response to the faster style of bolero dancing that had become popular over the years. The dance became obsolete in the mid-19th century, but survived in an academic tradition known as the escuela bolera, which influenced the development of modern flamenco dancing. One of the palos (styles) of flamenco is derived directly from the dance, the seguidillas boleras. In the 20th century, flamenco's popularity led to the almost extinction of the escuela bolera, which continues to exist in Seville. The genre's legacy also lives on in the works of many classical composers such as Maurice Ravel, whose most famous piece, Boléro, is named after the dance.

== Classical music ==
During its heyday, the bolero became a popular dance in ballrooms across Spain and was performed by Spanish troupes abroad along with other dances such as the cachucha. Over time, many classical composers wrote pieces inspired in the genre:

- Frédéric Chopin wrote Boléro for solo piano (Op. 19) in 1834, but its rhythms are more those of the polonaise. He was a close friend of Pauline Viardot, the daughter of the famed Spanish tenor Manuel García, who had introduced the bolero to Paris.
- Clara Schumann wrote "Caprice à la Boléro" as the second movement of her 4 Pièces caractéristiques for piano, opus 5, composed 1834–1836.
- Giuseppe Verdi wrote a bolero, Mercé, dilette amiche, for his 1855 opera I vespri siciliani.
- Charles-Auguste de Bériot wrote a bolero in his Scène de ballet (Op. 100), 1840s, for violin and piano (or orchestra), one of his most famous pieces.
- Julián Arcas wrote several bolero pieces for guitar and greatly influenced both the bolero form and guitar playing in the context of classical music.
- Louis James Alfred Lefébure-Wély wrote Boléro de Concert for organ in 1865.
- Hervé wrote a bolero for his operetta Chilpéric in 1868, which was immortalized in painting by Toulouse-Lautrec.
- Léo Delibes wrote a bolero in Tableau 2 of Coppélia, 1870.
- Camille Saint-Saëns wrote a bolero for 2 voices and orchestra, El desdichado, 1871.
- Moritz Moszkowski wrote a bolero as the last of his first set of Spanish Dances (Op. 12), 1876.
- César Cui's Bolero from 1881 was composed for solo soprano voice with accompaniment of orchestra or piano, and published with Russian, Italian, and French texts. The score is available at IMSLP/Petrucci.
- Friedrich Baumfelder wrote Premier Boléro for piano (Op. 317) in 1883.
- Joe Morley wrote a bolero for banjo titled "El contrabandista" (c. 1920) after noted banjoist and composer Alfred Cammeyer published a bolero in 4/4 time for banjo. Morley composed his as a true bolero in 3/4 time.
- Maurice Ravel wrote Boléro (whose working title was Fandango) as a ballet score commissioned by Ida Rubinstein in 1928, but it is now usually played as a concert piece. It has inspired other classical works such as Fumio Hayasaka's theme for Rashomon, 1950.
- Richard Aaker Trythall wrote a bolero for four percussionists in 1979. It is based on the rhythm and structure of the traditional Spanish bolero. Trythall imagined the four percussionists as four dancers, intertwining their solos, duets, and trios with moments of group ensemble work in the same way a choreographer might have done.
- John Serry Sr. composed his African Bolero for accordion and flute in 1950.
- Keith Emerson composed his Abaddon's Bolero for orchestra and synthesizer in 1972.
- Zbigniew Preisner's film score for Three Colors: Red (1994) employs the bolero rhythm in several cues.
- Ryuichi Sakamoto composed Blu in 2014, for piano and orchestra. The piece starts with a dreamy piano melody that is followed by a four-minute bolero part.
- Barry Gray composed Zero-X, an Incidental cue, for the score of the 1966 film 'Thunderbirds Are Go', using a bolero rhythm.

Some art music boleros are actually based on the habanera, a Cuban adaptation of the French contredanse which was often featured in French opera and Spanish zarzuela.

== See also ==
- Fandango
- Sevillanas
