= Ballroom dance =

Set of partner dances

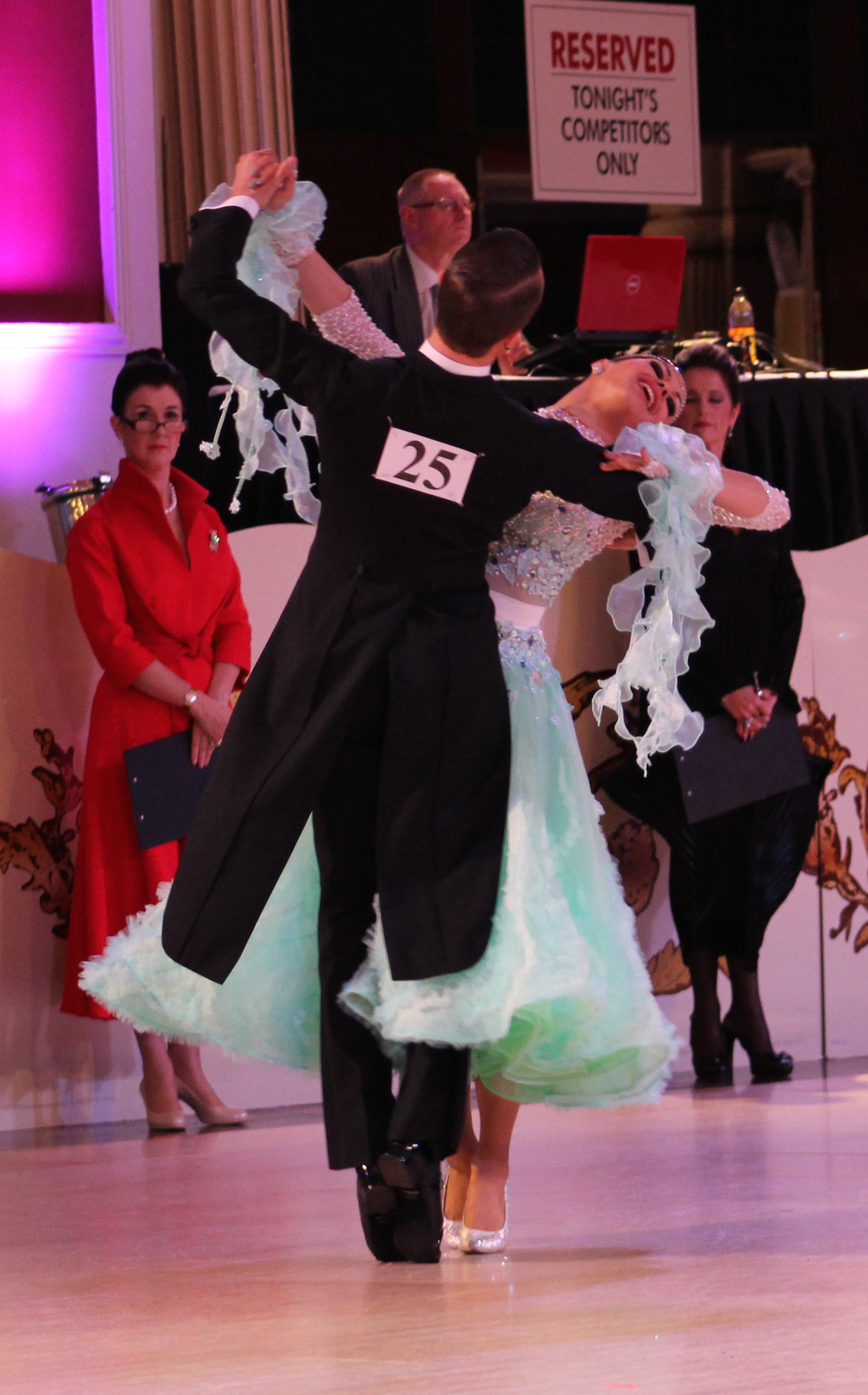
WDC World Youth (Under 21) Champions 2013, Michael Foskett & Nika Vlasenko. Adjudicators in background are former World Champion & British Open to the World Champions: Anne (née Lewis) Gleave (red dress) and Karen Hilton MBE (black dress).

Ballroom dance is a set of partner dances, which are enjoyed both socially and competitively around the world, mostly because of its performance and entertainment aspects. Ballroom dancing is also widely enjoyed on stage, film, and television.

== Definitions ==
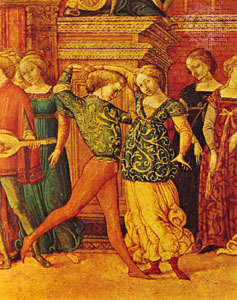
Galliard in Siena, Italy, 15th century

The term ballroom dancing is derived from the word ball which in turn originates from the Latin word ballare which means 'to dance' (a ball-room being a large room specially designed for such dances). In times past, ballroom dancing was social dancing for the privileged, leaving folk dancing for the lower classes. These boundaries have since become blurred. The definition of ballroom dance also depends on the era: balls have featured popular dances of the day such as the Minuet, Quadrille, Polonaise, Polka, Mazurka, and others, which are now considered to be historical dances.

== Schools ==
Ballroom dance may refer, at its widest definition, to almost any recreational dance with a partner. However, with the emergence of dance competition (now known as Dancesport), two principal schools have emerged and the term is used more narrowly to refer to the dances recognized by those schools.

The International School, originally developed in England and now regulated by the World Dance Council (WDC) and the World DanceSport Federation (WDSF), is prevalent everywhere except the United States. It encompasses two categories, Standard and Latin, each of which consist of five dances—International Waltz, International Tango, International Viennese Waltz, International Slow Foxtrot, and International Quickstep in the Standard category; and International Samba, International Cha Cha, International Rumba, International Paso Doble, and International Jive in the Latin category. A "Standard" or "Latin" competition encompasses all five dances in the respective category, and a "Ten Dance" competition encompasses all ten dances. The two styles, while differing in technique, rhythm, and costumes, exemplify core elements of ballroom dancing such as control and cohesiveness.

The American School is most common in the United States, where it is regulated by USA Dance, the respective national member of the WDSF. It also consists of two categories analogous to the Standard and Latin categories of the International School, respectively called Smooth and Rhythm. The Smooth category consists of only four dances—American Waltz, American Tango, American Foxtrot, and American Viennese Waltz, omitting American Peabody (the American School equivalent to Quickstep) -- while the dances selected for competition in the Rhythm category are American Cha Cha, American Rumba, American East Coast Swing (the American School equivalent to International Jive), American Bolero, and American Mambo. A "Smooth" or "Rhythm" competition encompasses the dances in the respective category, and a "Nine Dance" competition encompassing all nine of these dances is analogous to the "Ten Dance" competition of the International School. USA Dance additionally recognizes American Peabody, American Merengue, American Paso Doble, American Samba, American West Coast Swing, American Polka, and American Hustle as ballroom dances in which sanctioned competition may take place.

In Canada, both International and American styles are danced, regulated by Canada Dancesport (CDS).

Note that dances of the two schools that bear the same name may differ considerably in permitted patterns (figures), technique, and styling. For example, International foxtrot and American foxtrot are quite different though they have similar roots.

Exhibitions and social situations that feature ballroom dancing also may include additional partner dances such as Lindy Hop, Night Club Two Step, Night Club Swing, Bachata, Country Two Step, and regional (local or national) favorites that normally are not regarded as part of the ballroom family, and a number of historical dances also may be danced in ballrooms or salons. Additionally, some sources regard Sequence Dancing, in pairs or other formations, to be a style of ballroom dance.

== History ==
=== Early modern period ===
The first authoritative knowledge of the earliest ballroom dances was recorded toward the end of the 16th century, when Jehan Tabourot, under the pen name "Thoinot-Arbeau", published in 1588 his Orchésographie, a study of late 16th-century French renaissance social dance. Among the dances described were the solemn basse danse, the livelier branle, pavane, and the galliarde which Shakespeare called the "cinq pace" as it was made of five steps.

In 1650, the Minuet, originally a peasant dance of Poitou, was introduced into Paris and set to music by Jean-Baptiste Lully and danced by the King Louis XIV in public. The Minuet dominated the ballroom from that time until the close of the 18th century.

Toward the later half of the 17th century, Louis XIV founded his 'Académie Royale de Musique et de Danse', where specific rules for the execution of every dance and the "five positions" of the feet were formulated for the first time by members of the Académie. Eventually, the first definite cleavage between ballet and ballroom came when professional dancers appeared in the ballets, and the ballets left the Court and went to the stage. Ballet technique such as the turned out positions of the feet, however, lingered for over two centuries and past the end of the Victoria era.

=== 19th century ===
The waltz with its modern hold took root in England in about 1812; in 1819 Carl Maria von Weber wrote Invitation to the Dance, which marked the adoption of the waltz form into the sphere of absolute music. The dance was initially met with tremendous opposition due to the semblance of impropriety associated with the closed hold, though the stance gradually softened. In the 1840s several new dances made their appearance in the ballroom, including the polka, mazurka, and the Schottische. In the meantime a strong tendency emerged to drop all 'decorative' steps such as entrechats and ronds de jambes that had found a place in the Quadrilles and other dances.

=== Early 20th century ===
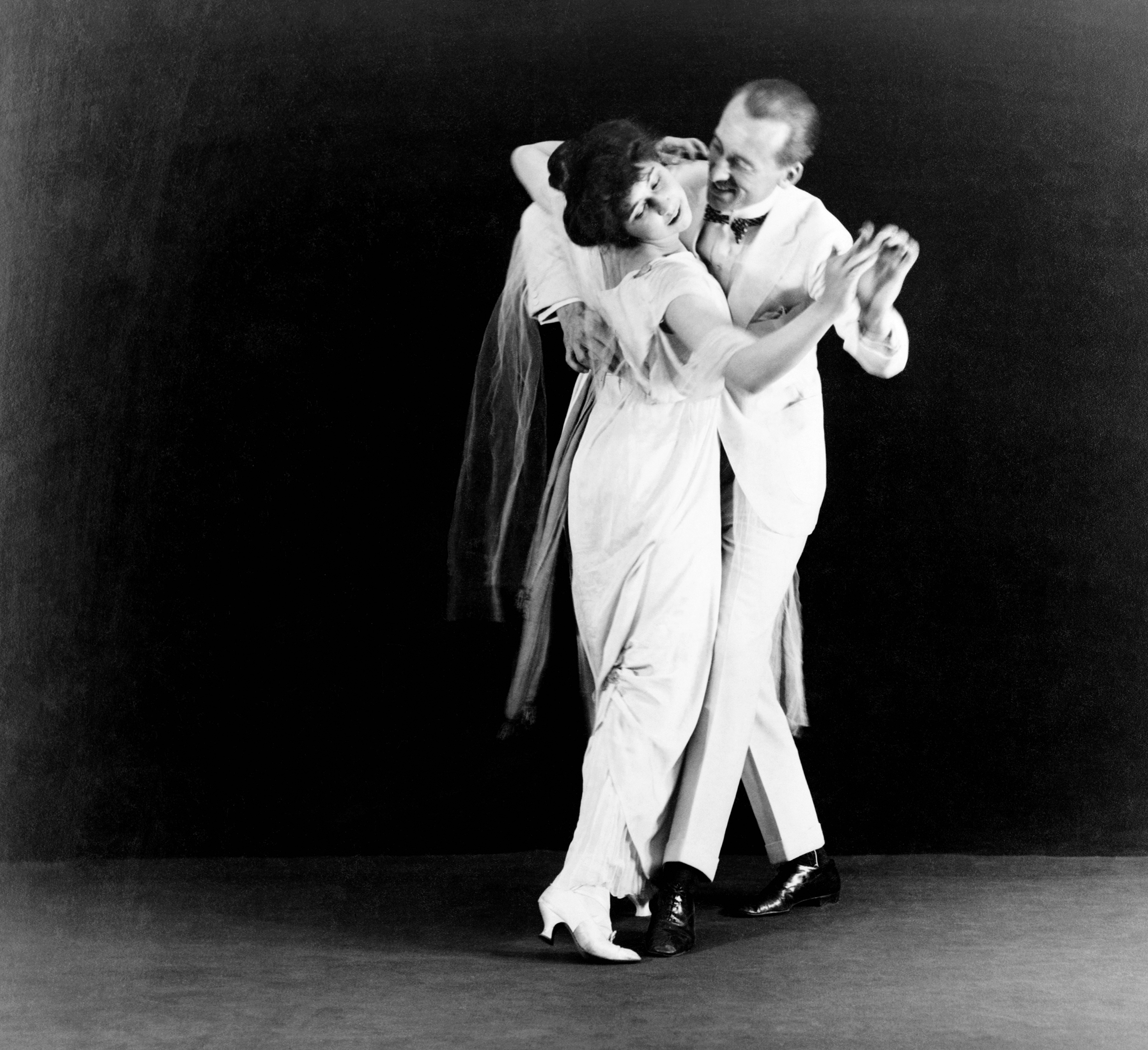
Vernon and Irene Castle, early ballroom dance pioneers, c. 1910–18

Modern ballroom dance has its roots early in the 20th century, when several different things happened more or less at the same time. The first was a movement away from the sequence dances towards dances where the couples moved independently. This had been pre-figured by the waltz, which had already made this transition. The second was a wave of popular music, such as jazz. Since dance is to a large extent tied to music, this led to a burst of newly invented dances. There were many dance crazes in the period 1910–1930.

The third event was a concerted effort to transform some of the dance crazes into dances which could be taught to a wider dance public in the U.S. and Europe. Here Vernon and Irene Castle were important, and so was a generation of English dancers in the 1920s, including Josephine Bradley and Victor Silvester. These professionals analysed, codified, published, and taught a number of standard dances. It was essential, if popular dance was to flourish, for dancers to have some basic movements they could confidently perform with any partner they might meet. Here the huge Arthur Murray organisation in America, and the dance societies in England, such as the Imperial Society of Teachers of Dancing, were highly influential. Finally, much of this happened during and after a period of World War, and the effect of such a conflict in dissolving older social customs was considerable.

Later, in the 1930s, the on-screen dance pairing of Fred Astaire and Ginger Rogers influenced all forms of dance in the U.S. and elsewhere. Although both actors had separate careers, their filmed dance sequences together, which included portrayals of the Castles, have reached iconic status. Much of Astaire and Rogers' work portrayed social dancing, although the performances were highly choreographed (often by Astaire or Hermes Pan) and meticulously staged and rehearsed.

== Competitive dancing ==
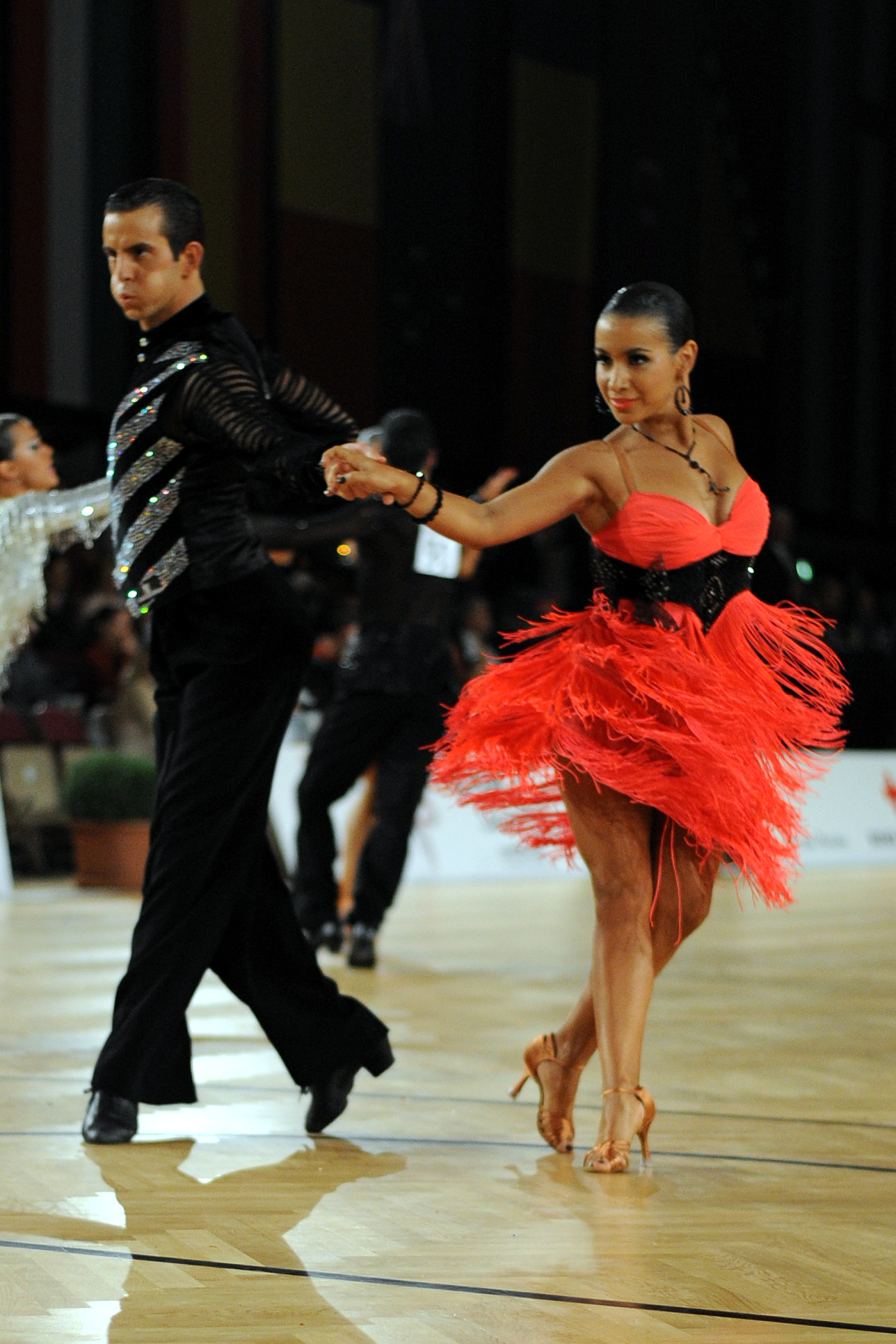
Cha-cha-cha dance at competitions in Austria.

Competitions, sometimes referred to as dancesport, range from world championships, regulated by the World Dance Council (WDC), to less advanced dancers at various proficiency levels. Most competitions are divided into professional and amateur, though in the USA pro-am competitions typically accompany professional competitions. The International Olympic Committee now recognizes competitive ballroom dance. It has recognized another body, the World DanceSport Federation (WDSF), as the sole representative body for dancesport in the Olympic Games.

Ballroom dance competitions are regulated by each country in its own way. There are about 30 countries which compete regularly in international competitions. There are another 20 or so countries which have membership of the WDC and/or the WDSF, but whose dancers rarely appear in international competitions. In Britain there is the British Dance Council, which grants national and regional championship titles, such as the British Ballroom Championships, the British Sequence Championships and the United Kingdom Championships. In the United States, the member branches of the WDC (National Dance Council of America) and the WDSF (USA Dance) both grant national and regional championship titles.

Ballroom dancing competitions in the former USSR also included the Soviet Ballroom dances, or Soviet Programme. Australian New Vogue is danced both competitively and socially. In competition, there are 15 recognized New Vogue dances, which are performed by the competitors in sequence. These dance forms are not recognized internationally, neither are the US variations such as American Smooth, and Rhythm. Such variations in dance and competition methods are attempts to meets perceived needs in the local market-place.

Internationally, the Blackpool Dance Festival, hosted annually at Blackpool, England is considered the most prestigious event a dancesport competitor can attend.

Formation dance is another style of competitive dance recognized by the WDSF. In this style, multiple dancers (usually in couples and typically up to 16 dancers at one time) compete on the same team, moving in and out of various formations while dancing. The Blackpool Dance Festival also holds an annual event for competitive formation dancing.

=== Elements of competition ===
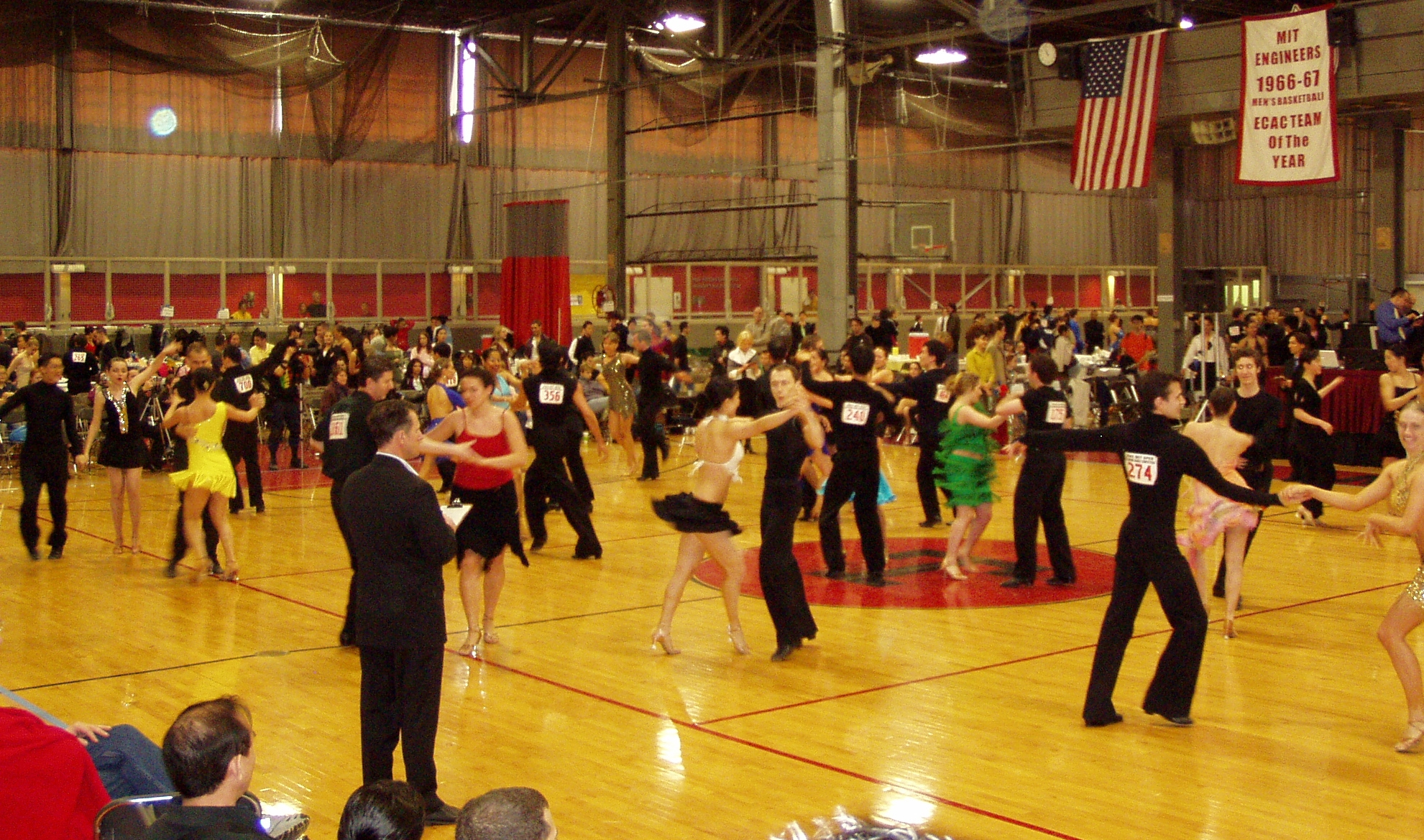
Intermediate level international style Latin dancing at the 2006 MIT ballroom dance competition. A judge stands in the foreground.

In competitive ballroom, dancers are judged by diverse criteria such as poise, the hold or frame, posture, musicality and expression, timing, body alignment and shape, floor craft, foot and leg action, and presentation. Judging in a performance-oriented sport is inevitably subjective in nature, and controversy and complaints by competitors over judging placements are not uncommon. The scorekeepers—called scrutineers—will tally the total number recalls accumulated by each couple through each round until the finals when the Skating system is used to place each couple by ordinals, typically 1–6, though the number of couples in the final may vary. Sometimes, up to 8 couples may be present on the floor during the finals.

Competitors dance at different levels based on their ability and experience. The levels are split into two categories, syllabus and open. The syllabus levels are newcomer/pre-bronze, bronze, silver, and gold—with gold the highest syllabus level and newcomer the lowest. In these levels, moves are restricted to those written in a syllabus, and illegal moves can lead to disqualification. Each level, bronze, silver, and gold, has different moves on their syllabus, increasing in difficulty. There are three levels in the open category; novice, pre-champ, and champ in increasing order of skill. At those levels, dancers no longer have restrictions on their moves, so complex routines are more common.

=== Medal evaluations ===
Medal evaluations for amateurs enable dancers' individual abilities to be recognized according to conventional standards. In medal evaluations, which are run by bodies such as the Imperial Society of Teachers of Dancing (ISTD) and the United Kingdom Alliance (UKA), each dancer performs two or more dances in a certain genre in front of a judge. Genres such as Modern Ballroom or Latin are the most popular. Societies such as the ISTD and UKA also offer medal tests on other dance styles (such as Country & Western, Rock 'n Roll or Tap). In some North American examinations, levels include Newcomer, Bronze, Silver, Gold, Novice, Pre-championship, and Championship; each level may be further subdivided into either two or four separate sections.

=== Equality Dancesport ===
Equality dancesport refers to competitive ballroom dance events that welcome same-sex or same-gender partnerships, allowing dancers to choose their role regardless of gender. Equality dancesport may also include role reversal events (in which a dancer that would typically lead, instead follows, and vice versa) and role swapping (in which dancers switch the role of lead and follow throughout their routine). These events emphasize inclusivity and diversity within the ballroom dance community. The International Federation of Same-Sex Dance Associations was founded by LGBTQ/ Same-Sex dance associations in North America and Europe to establish a governing body to sanction and regulate World Championships for same-sex and open role dancesport. Similar associations include the North American Equality Dancesport Association (NAEDA) (formerly known as the North American Same-Sex Partner Dance Association (NASSPDA)), the International Association of Gay/Lesbian Country Western Dance Clubs, and the European Equality Dance Association. Since its inception, the founding organizations have evolved from “same-sex dancing” to “equality dancing” to emphasize their inclusive approach to partner dancing, regardless of couple configuration.

== Collegiate ballroom ==
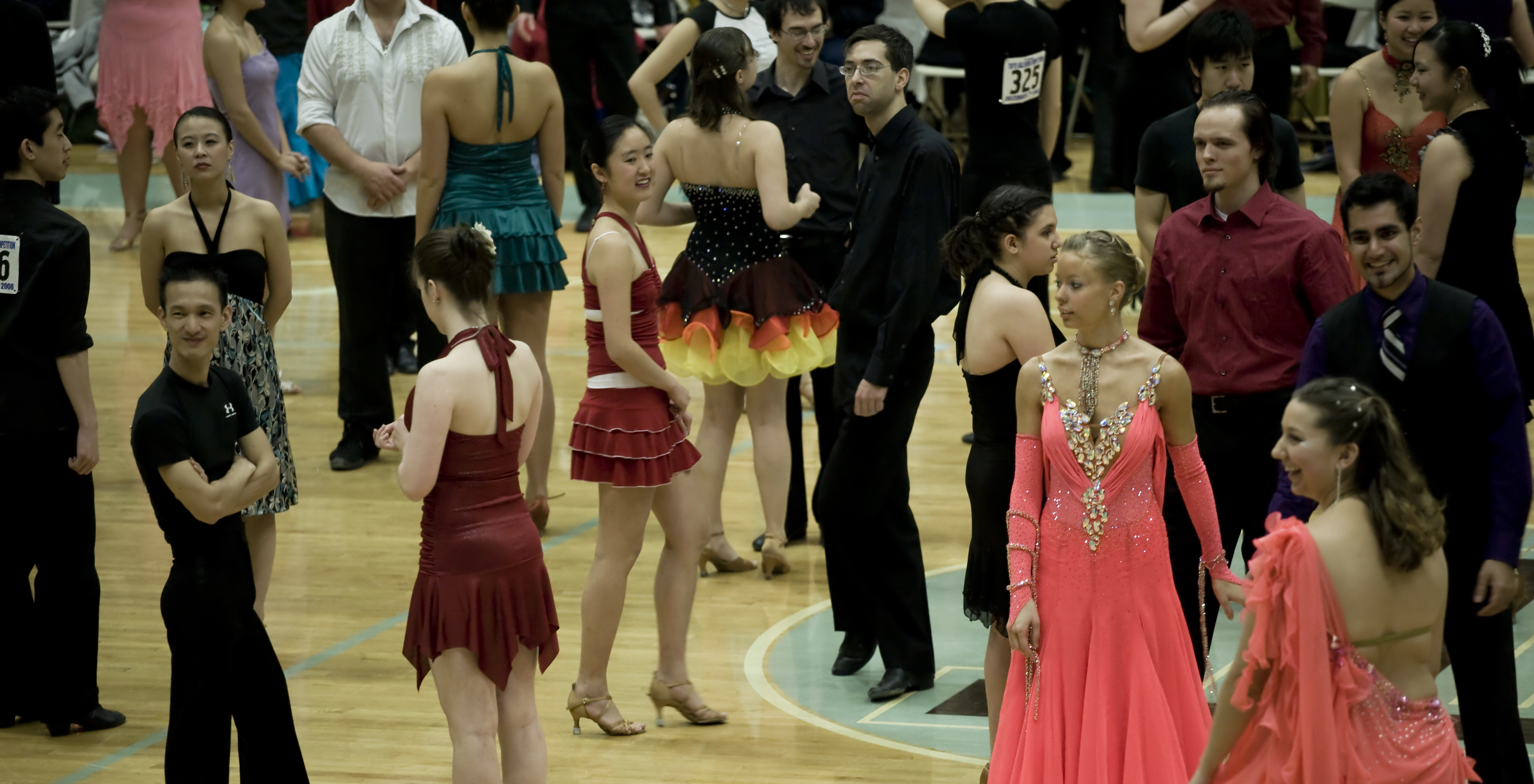
People on the dance floor waiting to dance and compete.

A significant portion of ballroom participants are undergraduate aged dancers who learn and compete through educational institutions. Collegiate chapters are typically student-led clubs or teams that organize dance lessons, social dances, and competitions. Typically, these teams provide space to dance recreationally or competitively, as well as create a bonding experience for collegiate dancers.

Intercollegiate ballroom competitions are often run with many of the same rules are regular amateur competitions as outlined above, but are usually organized entirely by collegiate teams. Examples include the East Coast FireBall, MIT Open Ballroom Dance Competition, Big Apple Dancesport Challenge, Purdue Ballroom Classic, Cardinal Classic, Berkeley Classic, Helluva Dance Competition and Harvard Invitational.

== Dances ==
Ballroom dance refers most often to the ten dances of Standard and Latin, though the term is also often used interchangeably with the five International Ballroom dances. Sequence dancing, which is danced predominantly in the United Kingdom, and its development New Vogue in Australia and New Zealand, are also sometimes included as a type of Ballroom dancing.

In the United States and Canada, the American Style (American Smooth and American Rhythm) also exists. The dance technique used for both International and American styles is similar, but International Ballroom allows only closed dance positions, whereas American Smooth allows closed, open and separated dance movements. In addition, different sets of dance figures are usually taught for the two styles. International Latin and American Rhythm have different styling, and have different dance figures in their respective syllabi.

Other dances sometimes placed under the umbrella "ballroom dance" include nightclub dances such as Lindy Hop, West Coast swing, nightclub two step, hustle, salsa, and merengue. The categorization of dances as "ballroom dances" has always been fluid, with new dances or folk dances being added to or removed from the ballroom repertoire from time to time, so no list of subcategories or dances is any more than a description of current practices. There are other dances historically accepted as ballroom dances, and are revived via the vintage dance movement.

In Europe, Latin Swing dances include Argentine tango, mambo, Lindy Hop, swing boogie (sometimes also known as nostalgic boogie), and discofox. One example of this is the subcategory of cajun dances that originated in Acadiana, with branches reaching both coasts of the United States.

Standard/Smooth dances are normally danced to Western music (often from the mid-twentieth century), and couples dance counter-clockwise around a rectangular floor following the line of dance. In competitions, competitors are costumed as would be appropriate for a white tie affair, with full gowns for the ladies and bow tie and tail coats for the men; though in American Smooth it is now conventional for the men to abandon the tailsuit in favor of shorter tuxedos, vests, and other creative outfits.

Latin/Rhythm dances are commonly danced to contemporary Latin American music and (in case of jive) Western music. With the exception of a few traveling dances like samba and pasodoble, couples do not follow the line of dance but perform their routines more or less in one spot. In competitions, the women are often dressed in short-skirted Latin outfits while the men are outfitted in tight-fitting shirts and pants, the goal being to emphasize the dancers' leg action and body movements.

== Competitive dances ==
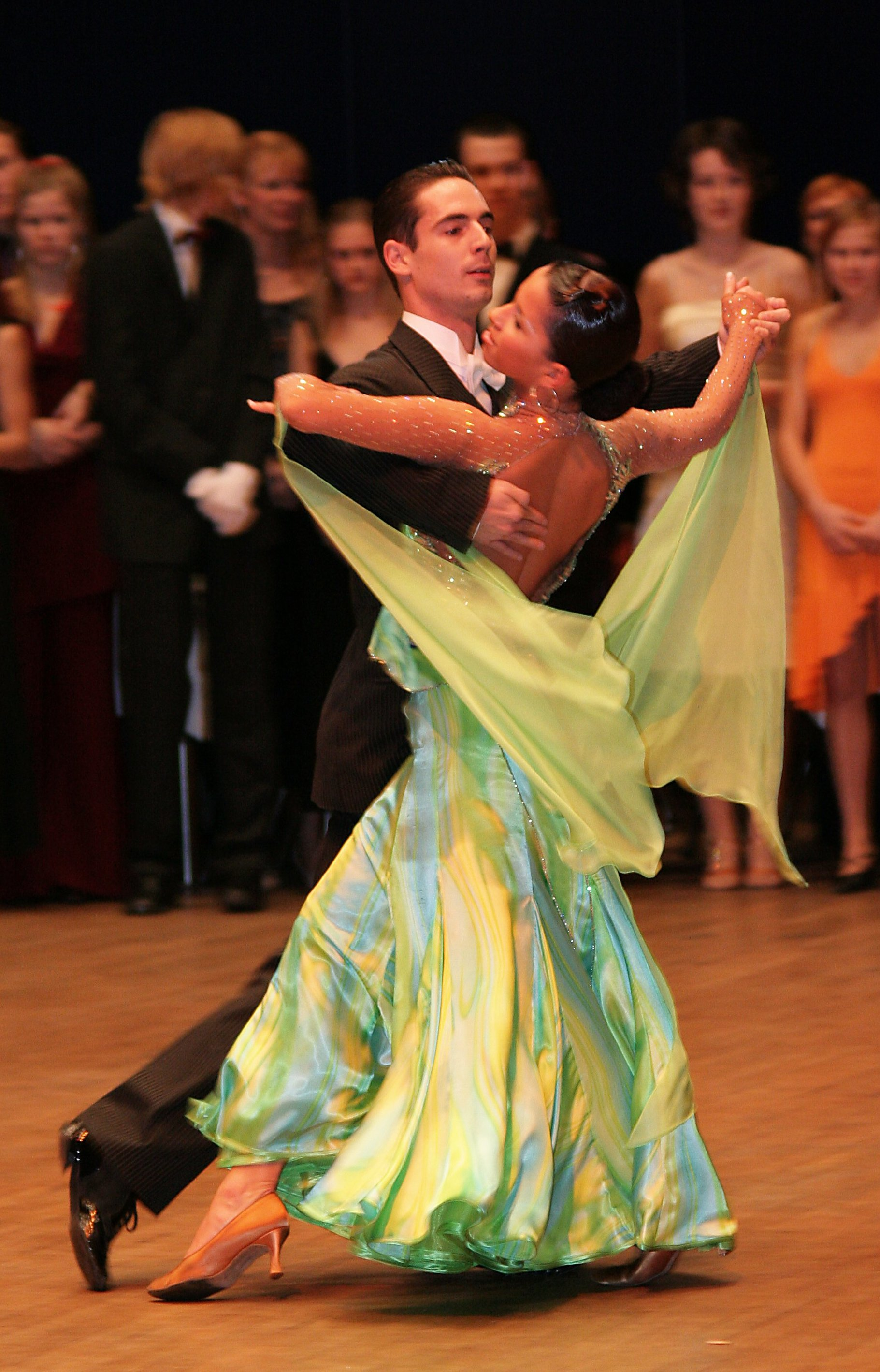
Tango exhibition at the Prague Congress Center

=== Standard/Smooth ===
==== Waltz ====
Waltz began as a country folk dance in Austria and Bavaria in the 17th century. In the early 19th century it was introduced in England. It was the first dance where a man held a woman close to his body. When performing the dance, the upper body is kept to the left throughout all figures, the follower's body leans to the right side of the leader while the head is extended left to follow the elbow. Figures with rotation have little rise. The start of the rise begins slowly from the first count, peaks on the 2nd count and lowers slowly on the 3rd. Sway is also used on the second step to make the step longer and also to slow down the momentum by bringing the feet together. Waltz is performed for both International Standard and American Smooth.

==== Viennese waltz ====
Viennese waltz originated in Provence area in France in 1559 and is recognized as the oldest of all ballroom dances. It was introduced in England as German waltz in 1812 and became popular throughout the 19th century by the music of Josef and Johann Strauss. It is often referred to as the classic “old-school” ballroom. Viennese waltz music is quite fast. Slight shaping of the body moves towards the inside of the turn and shaping forward and up to lengthen the opposite side from direction. Reverse turn is used to travel down long side and is overturned. While natural turn is used to travel short side and is underturned to go around the corners. Viennese waltz is performed for both International Standard and American Smooth.

==== Tango ====
Tango originated in Buenos Aires in the late 19th century. Modern Argentine tango is danced in both open and closed embraces which focuses on the lead and follow moving in harmony of the tango's passionate charging music. The tango's technique is like walking to the music while keeping feet grounded and allowing ankles and knees to brush against one another during each step taken. Tango is a flat-footed dance and unlike the other dances, has no rise and fall.

Ballroom tango, however, is a dance with a far more open frame, often utilising strong and staccato movements. Ballroom tango, rather than Argentine tango, is performed in international competition.

==== Foxtrot ====
The foxtrot is an American dance, believed to be of African-American origin. It was named by a vaudeville performer Harry Fox in 1914. Fox was rapidly trotting step to ragtime music. The dance therefore was originally named as the “Fox’s trot”. The foxtrot can be danced at slow, medium, or fast tempos depending on the speed of the jazz or big band music. The partners are facing one another and frame rotates from one side to another, changing direction after a measure. The dance is generally danced flat, with not much rise and fall. The walking steps are taken as slow for the two beats per steps and quick for one beat per step. Foxtrot is performed for both International Standard and American Smooth.

==== Quickstep ====
The quickstep is an English dance and was invented in the 1920s as a combination of faster tempo of foxtrot and the Charleston. It is a fast moving dance, so men are allowed to close their feet and the couples move in short syncopated steps. Quickstep includes the walks, runs, chasses, and turns of the original foxtrot dance, with some other fast figures such as locks, hops, run, quick step, jump and skips. Quick step is performed as an International Standard dance.

=== Latin/Rhythm ===
==== Pasodoble ====
The pasodoble originated from Spain and its dramatic bullfights. The dance is mostly performed only in competitions and rarely socially because of its many choreographic rules. The lead plays the role of the matador while the follow takes the role of the matador's cape, the bull, or even the matador. The chasse cape refers to the lead using the follow to turn them as if they are the cape, and the appel is when the lead stomps their foot to get the bull's attention. Pasodoble is performed as an International Latin dance.

==== Spanish bolero ====
The Spanish bolero was developed in the late 18th century out of the seguidilla, and its popularization is attributed to court dancers such as Sebastián Cerezo. It became one of the most popular ballroom dances of the 19th century and saw many classical adaptations. However, by the 20th century it had become old-fashioned. A Cuban music genre of the same name, bolero, which became popular in the early 20th century, is unrelated to the Spanish dance.

==== Cuban bolero ====
Although Cuban bolero was born as a form of trova, traditional singer/songwriter tradition from eastern Cuba, with no associated dance, it soon became a ballroom favorite in Cuba and all of Latin America. The dance most commonly represents the couple falling in love. Modern bolero is seen as a combination of many dances: like a slow salsa with contra-body movement of tango, patterns of rhumba, and rise and fall technique and personality of waltz and foxtrot. Bolero can be danced in a closed hold or singly and then coming back together. It is performed as an American Rhythm dance.

==== Samba ====
Samba is the national dance of Brazil. The rhythm of samba and its name originated from the language and culture of West African slaves. In 1905, samba became known to other countries during an exhibition in Paris. In the 1940s, samba was introduced in America through Carmen Miranda. The international version of Ballroom Samba has been based on an early version of Brazilian Samba called Maxixe, but has since developed away and differs strongly from Brazilian Ballroom Samba, which is called Samba de Gafieira. International Ballroom Samba is danced with a slight bounce which is created through the bending and straightening the knee. It is performed as an International Latin dance, although most of its modern development has occurred outside Latin America.

==== Rumba ====
Rumba came to the United States from Cuba in the 1920s and became a popular cabaret dance during prohibition. Rumba is a ballroom adaptation of son cubano and bolero (the Cuban genre) and, despite its name, it rarely included elements of Cuban rumba. It includes Cuban motions through knee-strengthening, figure-eight hip rotation, and swiveling foot action. An important characteristic of rumba is the powerful and direct lead achieved through the ball of the foot. Rumba is performed for both International Latin and American Rhythm.

==== Mambo ====
Mambo was developed as an offshoot of danzón, the national dance of Cuba, in the late 1930s by Orestes López and his brother Cachao, of Arcaño y sus Maravillas. They conceived a new form of danzón influenced by son cubano, with a faster, improvised final section, which allowed dancers to more freely express themselves, given that danzón had traditionally a very rigid structure. In the 1940s, Dámaso Pérez Prado transformed the mambo from the charanga into the big band format, and took it to Mexico and the United States, where it became a "dance craze".

==== Cha Cha ====
Cha Cha (sometimes wrongly called Cha Cha Cha based on a "street version" of the dance with shifted timing) was developed by Enrique Jorrín in the early 1950s, as a slower alternative to Mambo—and, in fact, was originally called Triple Mambo. The Cha Cha is a flirtatious dance with many hip rotations and partners synchronising their movements. The dance includes bending and straightening of the knee giving it a touch of Cuban motion. Cha-cha is performed for both International Latin and American Rhythm.

==== East Coast Swing ====
Swing in 1927 was originally named the Lindy Hop named by Shorty George Snowden. There have been 40 different versions documented over the years; most common is the East Coast swing which is performed in the American Smooth (or American Rhythm) only in the U.S. or Canada. The East Coast swing was established by Arthur Murray and others only shortly after World War II. Swing music is very lively and upbeat and can be danced to jazz or big band music. The swing dancing style has much bounce and energy. Swing also includes many spins and underarm turns. East Coast swing is performed as an American Rhythm dance.

==== Jive ====
The jive is part of the swing dance group and is a very lively variation of the jitterbug. Jive originated from African American clubs in the early 1940s. During World War II, American soldiers introduced the jive in England where it was adapted to today's competitive jive. In jive, the man leads the dance while the woman encourages the man to ask her to dance. It is danced to big band music, and some technique is taken from salsa, swing and tango. Jive is performed as an International Latin dance.

== Dance style classification ==
=== International Style competition dances ===
According to World Dance Council.

==== Standard ====
Waltz: 28 bars per minute, 3/4 time, also known as Slow Waltz or English Waltz depending on locality

Tango: 31 bars per minute, 4/4 time

Viennese Waltz: 58 bars per minute, 3/4 time. On the European continent, the Viennese waltz is known simply as waltz, while the waltz is recognized as English waltz or Slow Waltz.

Foxtrot: 28 bars per minute, 4/4 time

Quickstep: 50 bars per minute, 4/4 time

==== Latin ====
Cha-cha-cha: 29 bars per minute, 4/4 time

Samba: 49 bars per minute, 2/4 time

Rumba: 24 bars per minute, 4/4 time

Paso Doble: 60 bars per minute, 2/4 time

Jive: 41 bars per minute, 4/4 time

=== American Style competition dances ===
==== Smooth ====
Waltz: 29–30 bars per minute. 30–32 bars per minute for Bronze

Tango: 60 bars per minute 30–32 bars per minute for Bronze

Foxtrot: 30 bars per minute 32–34 bars per minute for Bronze

Viennese Waltz: 53–54 bars per minute 54 bars per minute for Bronze

==== Rhythm ====
Cha Cha: 30 bars per minute

Rumba: 30–32 bars per minute 32–36 bars per minute for Bronze

East Coast Swing: 36 bars per minute 34–36 bars per minute for Bronze

Bolero: 24 bars per minute 24–26 bars per minute for Bronze

Mambo: 47 bars per minute 48–51 bars per minute for Bronze

=== Others ===
Historical/Vintage Ballroom dance:

Waltz – Polka – Schottische – Tango – One-Step – Foxtrot – Peabody

Other dances occasionally categorized as ballroom:

Nightclub
Nightclub Two-step – Hustle – Modern Jive / LeRoc / Ceroc – and the whole swing variety: West Coast Swing / East Coast Swing/ Lindy Hop (always included in the "Rhythm-Swing" category) / Charleston / Carolina Shag / Collegiate Shag / Balboa / Blues – Fusion

Latin nightclub
Salsa – Cumbia – Mambo – Merengue – Porro – Cha cha – Bachata

African nightclub
Kizomba – Semba – Coladeira - Funana - Zouk

Brazilian Dances
Forró – Pagode – Samba de Gafieira – Lambada - Zouk-Lambada

Country/Western
C/W Polka – C/W Cha-cha – C/W Two-step – C/W Waltz

Cajun dances
Cajun One Step or Cajun Jig – Cajun Two Step – Zydeco – Cajun Waltz – Cajun Jitterbug

Musette dances
Java – musette-waltz – musette-tango – musette-paso-doble

Other
Argentine tango – New Vogue

== See also ==
- Dance in Canada
- Dance sport in Austria
- Australian Dance
- Dancesport at the Asian Games
