= Australian Dancing Society =

Australian Dancing Society Ltd
- Formation: 1942
- Founder: Mickey Powell
- Headquarters: Australia
- President: Barry White
- Website: Australian Dancing Society Ltd

The Australian Dancing Society (ADS) Ltd is an organisation which represents the interests of dancesport and ballroom dancing within Australia.

== History ==
ADS was formed in 1942 by Mickey Powell. Powell was president of the Australian Dancing Society in its early years. By 1944 it was conducting grade and medal tests and conducting examinations for teachers' accreditation. By 1950 it had 10,000 members and in that year became affiliated with the International Council of Ballroom Dancing, with headquarters in England.

== Organisation ==
The ADS has branches in all states of Australia and organizes in excess of 30 dancesport competitions every year.

== Responsibilities ==
The ADS is a not for profit organisation that provides comprehensive service at all levels and facets of the sport of dance.

== See also ==
- New Vogue (dance)
