= The Little Mute Boy =

Poem by Federico García Lorca

- by Federico García Lorca
- Form: Copla
- Meter: irregular
- Rhyme scheme: -a-a
- Lines: 12

The Little Mute Boy

The little boy was looking for his voice.
(The king of the crickets had it.)
In a drop of water
the little boy was looking for his voice.

I do not want it for speaking with;
I will make a ring of it
so that he may wear my silence
on his little finger

In a drop of water
the little boy was looking for his voice.

(The captive voice, far away,
put on a cricket’s clothes.)

"The Little Mute Boy" ("El niño mudo") is a poem by Federico García Lorca published in his Canciones (1921-1924). In the poem, Lorca tells "a story in which separation and alienation predominate, as a child's voice is missing and imprisoned in the being of another". This theme is continued in the following poem, "El niño loco" ("The Crazy Boy").

Structurally, the poem is made of three coplas in octosyllabic verses with assonant rhymes between the even verses.

In 1947, the poem, translated to French as "L'enfant muet", was adapted musically by Francis Poulenc along two others poems from the Canciones.
