= Samba de Gafieira =

Partner dance to Brazilian samba rhythms

Samba de Gafieira (also called Gafieira) is a partner dance to various Brazilian samba musical rhythms. Unlike street and club forms of Brazilian samba, it evolved as a ballroom dance (dança de salão, literally, "salon dance").

Samba de Gafieira differs from the ballroom Samba, danced in International Latin and American Rhythm ballroom dance styles.

Gafieira is usually a pair dance, although in artistic performances it is not uncommon to add solo variations, including steps of Samba no Pé.

== Word meaning ==
The word "gafieira" can also refer to the traditional samba music orchestra, as well as the dance hall where it is performed. The term gafieira was Brazilian Portuguese slang meaning "low dancing resort, gaff, honky-tonk" or "dance festivity frequented by the populace".

== Origins ==
The style originated from samba dancing in cabarets and gafieiras (hence the name, literally meaning "Samba of gafieira"), primarily in districts of Botafogo, Catete and Centro of Rio de Janeiro. The term gained recognition in 1940s. Over time the style significantly evolved away from the style 1940s under significant influence of Argentine Tango and incorporating many acrobatic elements. In modern codification of the dance, acrobatic elements and the ones not characteristic to Brazilian culture are excluded from the syllabus. They cannot be used in dance competitions, but still can be used as embellishments in the show version of the dance ("Samba de Gafieira de show").

== Beginners' steps ==
Gafieira basic steps (leader). The numbers are the beats of the musical 8-beat phrase

Like Argentine Tango, Gafieira is danced in either open embrace, where lead and follow connect at arm's length, or close embrace, where the lead and follow connect chest-to-chest.

=== Passo basico ===
Passo basico ("Basic step"), sometimes called Quadrado ("square") or Quadradinho ("little square"), is a simple beginner's step with rhythm "quick-quick-slow, quick-quick-slow" over a 4 beat measure (1&2, 3&4).

While "Quadrado" is sometimes translated as "box step", is not really a box step; its footprint is rather similar to the "Basic movement" of the international ballroom Samba syllabus: there is no side step typical of the box step. The lateral movements on one and two and on five and six are almost in place (or sometimes on one moving the left foot slightly forward and on five moving the right foot slightly backward).

Often only a half of the passo basico is used, e.g., as part of other, more complicated step patterns or as an entry in the dance.

=== Saída Lateral ===
The Saída Lateral or Saída ao lado (both literally mean "exit to side", "lateral exit", sometimes translated as "right cross body lead") step is used to enter or exit many other more elaborate Gafieira steps.

To execute the figure, start with the first 5 footsteps of the Passo Basico, with the leader's 5th step taken slightly backwards, slightly parting from the follower. The leader's 6th (slow, right foot) step is forward left across the standing foot outside the partner. The follower's 6th step is backward sideways, crossing the left foot behind.

In descriptions of more complicated patterns, "Saída ao Lado" often refers to only the last three described steps.

== Syllabus ==
In 2001, a meeting of teachers took place in Rio de Janeiro, where a common syllabus of main steps for Samba de Gafieira was established, for unified teaching and competitions. The voted syllabus excluded acrobatic steps, i.e., the ones where both feet of a dancer are off the ground. It also excluded steps not characteristic to Brazilian dance. The syllabus is divided into three categories: Nível Básico (Basic Level, or "Bronze"), Nível Intermediário (Intermediate Level, or "Silver"), and Nível Avançado (Advanced Level, or "Gold").

Samba de Gafieira is not restricted to the syllabus, which only lists steps commonly agreed to be most important. New steps may be created or entries and exits of the described steps modified, provided they preserve the spirit of Samba de Gafieira.

=== Basic level ===
- Passo Básico (Basic Step)
- Saída Lateral /Saída ao lado (Lateral Exit)
- Tirada ao lado (Lateral Drawing)
- Cruzado (Crossed)
- Gancho (Hook)
- Balanço (Swing)
- Caminhada (Promenade)
- Esse (letter "S")
- Giro da Dama (Lady's Spin)
- Puladinho (Jump)

=== Intermediate level ===
- Romário (after the world-famous soccer player Romário)
- Tirada de Perna (Leg Taken Away)
- Assalto (Attack)
- Facão (Jackknife)
- Gancho Redondo (Round Hook)
- Trança (Braid)
- Tesoura (Scissors)
- Balão Apagado (Falling Balloon)
- Picadinho (Twists, literally "Stew")
- Mestre Sala, (literally "Master of Ceremonies"; here it is a reference to a dancer with a special function during the Brazilian carnival, see pt:Mestre-sala e porta-bandeira)

=== Advanced level ===
- Pião (Spinning top)
- Pica-pau (Woodpecker)
- Escovinha (Brush)
- Bicicleta (Bicycle)
- Enceradeira (Floor polisher)
