= Box step =

Dance step

Box step in rumba and left box in waltz

Box step is a basic dance step named after the pattern it creates on the floor, which is that of a square or box. It is used in a number of American Style ballroom dances: rumba, waltz, bronze-level foxtrot. While it can be performed individually, it is usually done with a partner. This is the most common dance step in the waltz. In international standard dance competition, there is a similar step called closed change.

In a typical example, the leader begins with the left foot and proceeds as follows.

- First half-box: forward-side-together
- Second half-box: backwards-side-together

Every step is with full weight transfer.

Rhythm varies. For example, it is "1-2-3, 4-5-6" in waltz and "slow quick quick, slow quick quick" in rumba.

In other dances (and in variations) the box may start from the left or right foot, either back or forward, or even sidewise. For example, in the quadrado figure of samba de Gafieira the leader steps (starting with the left foot) "left-together-back, right-together-forward".

== In waltz ==
For the left box, the leader starts with their feet closed. On beat 1 they step forward with their left foot, then they step to the side with their right foot on 2, closes their left to their right foot on 3; steps back with their right foot on 4, to the side with their left foot on 5, and closes their right to their left foot on 6. During the second and fifth step, the foot is supposed to travel along two sides of the box, rather than along its diagonal.

The follower also starts with their feet closed. On beat 1 they step back with their right foot, then they step to the side with their left foot on 2, closes their right to their left foot on 3; steps forward with their left foot on 4, to the side with their right foot on 5, and closes their left to their right foot on 6.

The right box consists of the same steps only mirrored, that is, left and right feet are exchanged for both leader and follower.

== In popular culture ==
This dance was featured in an episode of Curious George called "School of Dance". George first saw the Renkins doing it, then he taught it to Bill, the Quints, the Man with the Yellow Hat, and at the end, Allie.

== See also ==
- Jazz box, a similar footprint pattern, but with cross-steps
