= Boleras =

Seguidillas boleras, or simply boleras, is a palo (style) of flamenco music based on the seguidilla poetic form and the Spanish dance known as bolero. It is considered a member of the cante chico family of palos. The term "boleras" was popularized around 1812–13 to designate female dancers who performed boleros. Their particular style gave rise to the bolera school of dance, which was prevalent in Spain throughout the 19th century. To distinguish the sung boleros from the dance itself, the term "seguidilla bolera" is used. Towards the end of the 19th century, the bolero form was incorporated into the flamenco repertoire as a new palo.
