= Sebastián Cerezo =

Spanish dancer

Sebastián Cerezo, also spelled Zerezo, (Note: Cerezo and Zerezo were alternative spellings in the 18th century. The misspelled form Sebastiano Carezo is found some in English sources.) was a Spanish dancer from La Mancha. In 1799, he was credited by Zamácola y Ocerín as one of the earliest and best dancers of the bolero, a Spanish dance developed between 1750 and 1772, which became very popular in Madrid, La Mancha, Andalusia and Murcia in the 1780s. According to Zamácola y Ocerín, Cerezo danced slowly and his particular way of dancing marked the definitive transition from seguidilla to bolero (from voleo, cf. vuelo, 'flight'). This original slow way of dancing was promoted by Murcian dancer Requejo around 1800 in response to the faster style of bolero dancing that had become popular over the years.
