= Copla (poetry) =

The copla is a poetic form of four verses found in many Spanish popular songs as well as in Spanish language literature. There is a related musical genre of the same name. The form is also found widely in Hispanic America. The name derives from the Latin copula ("link" or "union").

Coplas normally consists of four verses de arte menor (that is, of no more than eight syllables to a line) of four lines each, either of Spain's most characteristic popular meter, the romance (8- 8a 8- 8a), or of seguidilla (7- 5a 7- 5a) or redondilla (8a 8b 8b 8a).

Although most commonly considered a popular form, it has not been scorned by cultivated writers. Among those who have written coplas are Íñigo López de Mendoza, Marquis of Santillana, Rafael Alberti, Luis de Góngora, Antonio Machado, Jorge Manrique and Federico García Lorca. Manuel Machado wrote of coplas, using the form himself:

Hasta que el pueblo las canta,
las coplas, coplas no son,
y cuando las canta el pueblo
ya nadie sabe el autor.

Tal es la gloria, Guillén,
de los que escriben cantares:
oír decir a la gente
que no los ha escrito nadie.

Procura tú que tus coplas
vayan al pueblo a parar,
aunque dejen de ser tuyas
para ser de los demás.

Que, al fundir el corazón
en el alma popular,
lo que se pierde de nombre
se gana de eternidad.

Translation:

Until the folk sings them
coplas are not coplas,
and when the folk sing them
By then, no one knows who wrote them.

Such is the glory, Guillén,
Of those who write songs:
To hear the folk say
That no one wrote these.

Try to make it that your songs
go among the folk to stick around,
although they cease to be yours
to belong to the others.

Which, to melt the heart
in the soul of the folk,
that which it loses of a name
it gains of eternity.

The language of the copla is colloquial and direct, although there may also be double entendres, especially for comic or lascivious effect.

== Bibliography ==
- La Copla Popular Española. Gerald Brenan. This book was left incomplete by Brenan and was prepared for publication by Antonio José Lópes López.
