= Dance in Canada =

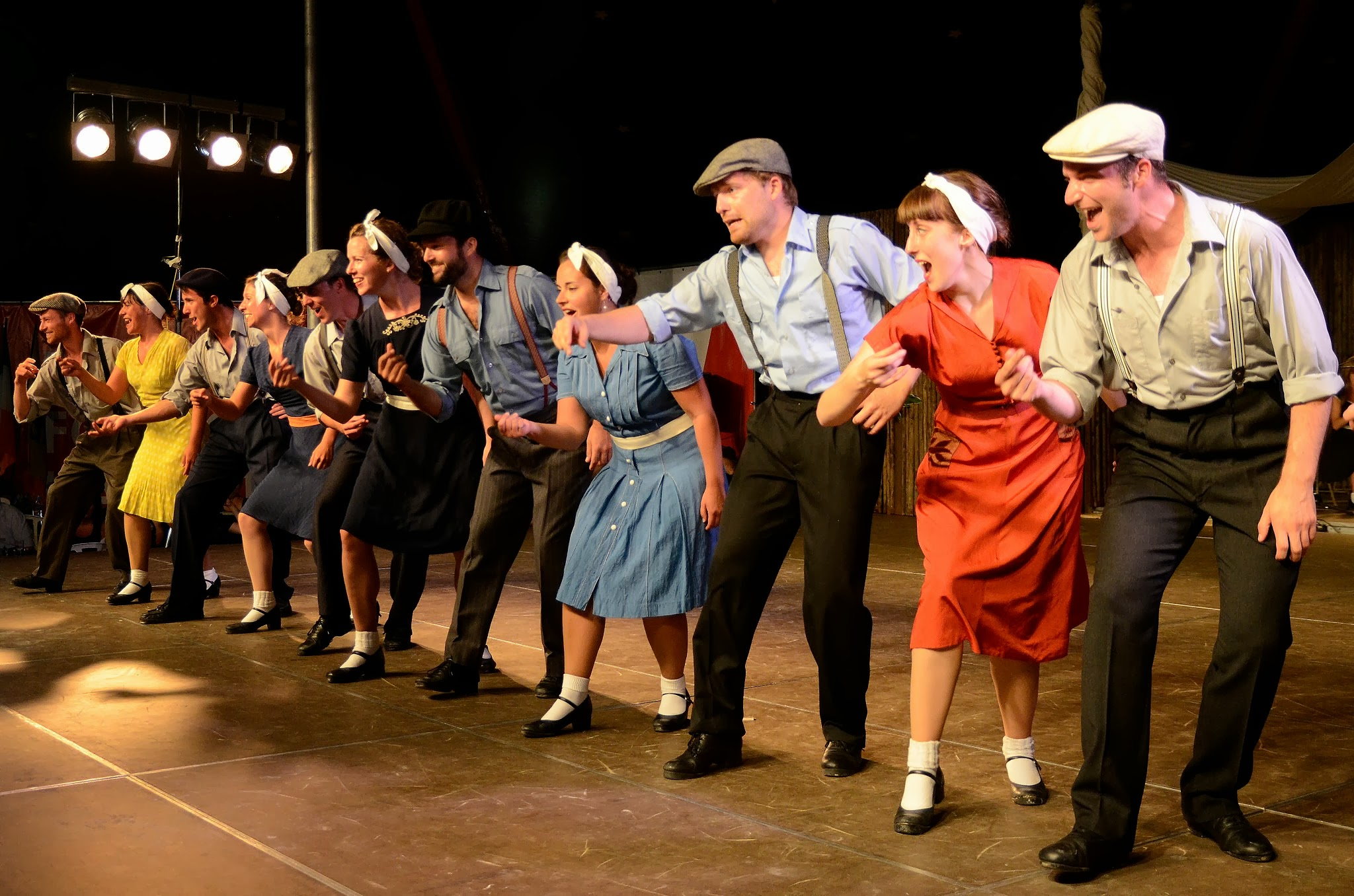
A traditional Quebecois dance.

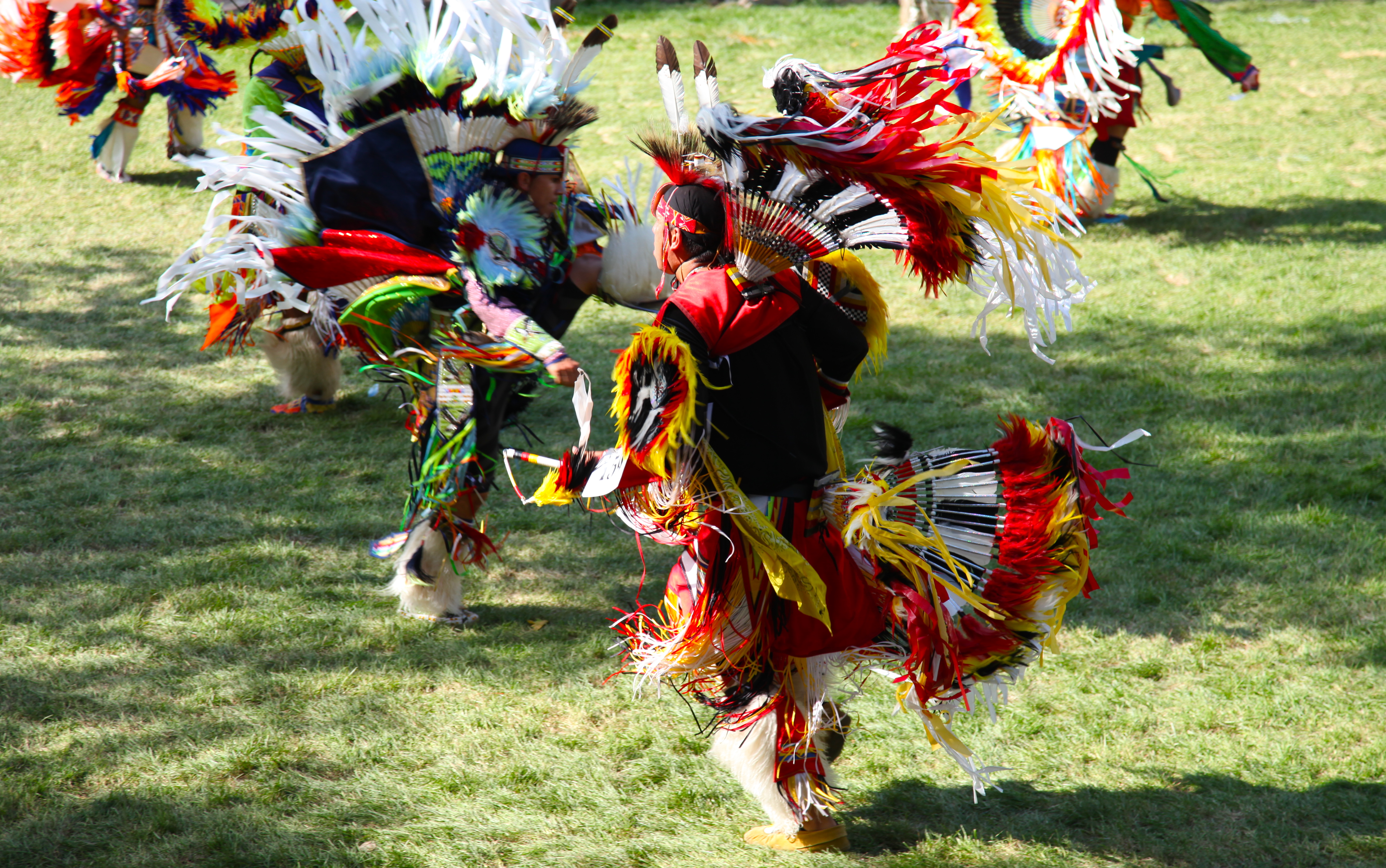
First Nations Pow Wow in Wendake, Quebec.

A large variety of dance companies exist in Canada, encompassing a wide tradition of dances that represent both its many indigenous cultures, as well as that of its European-descended population.

== Ballet companies and dance groups ==
Some ballet companies include the Royal Winnipeg Ballet, the National Ballet of Canada (which is based in Toronto), Ballet Jörgen Canada (also based in Toronto), Les Grands Ballets Canadiens (based in Montréal), the Alberta Ballet (based in Calgary), Ballet BC (based in Vancouver), Ballet Kelowna, Ballet du Printemps (also based in Vancouver), Ballet Victoria, Canadian Pacific Ballet (based in Victoria), and the Goh Ballet in Vancouver. There are also many modern dance companies including Toronto Dance Theatre, O Vertigo in Montréal, Compagnie Marie Chouinard in Montréal, Par B.l.eux founded by Benoît Lachambre in Montréal, Danny Grossman Dance Company in Toronto, The Chimera Project in Toronto, Mocean Dance in Halifax and Winnipeg's Contemporary Dancers.

The largest company in the country is The National Ballet of Canada. The Royal Winnipeg is the second oldest and longest continuously running ballet company in North America. It was the first ballet company in the Common Wealth to receive the Royal charter. Canada is home to hundreds of amateur Ukrainian dance groups as well as professional and semi-professional companies such as the Cheremosh Ukrainian Dance Company in Edmonton.

== Modern dance companies in Canada ==
Dancemakers is a modern dance company in Canada created in 1974 by Marcy Radler and Andraya Ciel Smith. In 1977 Peggy Baker and Patricia Miner were the first co-directors of Dancemakers. In 1979 Anna Blewchamp and then Peggy Baker were directors of Dancemakers. In 1980 Carol Anderson and Patricia Fraser became co-artistic directors of Dancemakers. Carol Anderson became the sole artistic director of Dancemakers from 1985-1988.

Another modern dance company in Canada is the Danny Grossman Dance Company. In 1975, the Danny Grossman Dance Company was founded in Toronto, Ontario. The Danny Grossman Dance Company originally consisted of dancers Danny Grossman, Judy Hendon, Erik Bobrow and Greg Parks. The company has performed around the world as well as within Canada. Presently, the company goes and teaches the work of the Danny Grossman Dance Company to dancers who are currently getting their dance education in academic institutions.

== Post-Secondary dance programs in Canada ==
There are dance programs in Canada at the post-secondary level. York University, University of Québec, Concordia, University of Calgary, and Simon Fraser University all offer studies in Dance. There are college programs for dance at Toronto Metropolitan University (formerly Ryerson University), George Brown College and Grant MacEwan College.

== Ballroom dance in Canada ==
Canada is an active member of two largest ballroom dance associations, WDSF (national branch called Canada DanceSport) and WDC. It hosts such noticeable annual dance competitions as Snowball Classic and La Classique du Quebec.

== Indigenous dance ==
The Red River Jig is a traditional dance of the Canadian Métis. The origins of the dance lie in the traditional dances of the First Nations, French, English, Scots, and Orcadian peoples from whom the Métis Nation was born. The name refers to the Red River of the North which forms the border between North Dakota and Minnesota flowing northward through Winnipeg, Manitoba to Hudson Bay.

A Round Dance is a traditional dance of several Indigenous groups in Western Canada. A powwow typically includes several dances such as jingle dress dancing and hoop dancing. Northwest coast Indigenous nations in the smokehouse or longhouse traditions include ceremonial, social and performative dancing such as the archer dance and the down-spreading dance.

== Notable Canadian dancers ==
Canadian dancers have been recognised in international competitions.

- Alain Doucet and Anik Jolicoeur-Doucet were four time professional ten dance world champions.
- Maurizio Vescovo and Andra Vaidilaite were professional Latin World Cup champions 2013 in Moscow.
- Anton Belyaev and Antoaneta Popova won third place in World Ten Dance Championship 2013 in Vienna.
- Vadim Garbuzov was Canadian youth Standard champion 2004 and Canadian youth Latin champion 2003 with Nadiya Dyatlova. Then with Kathrin Menzinger he became 2015 world champion in Latin show and world champion in standard show.
- Richard Lifshitz and Greta Korju: World Champions 2013 U-19 and U-21 WDC AL Youth Latin (Paris, France), Canadian Champions 2013 U-21 and Youth Latin, North American Champions 2013 16+ and Youth Latin.

== Jacqueline Lemieux Prize ==
The Canada Council for the Arts administers the Jacqueline Lemieux Prize that recognizes outstanding contributions to dance in Canada from established dance professionals.

The prize was established in 1980 and is awarded in memory of Jacqueline Lemieux and her contribution to the development of Canadian dance. Lemieux and her husband Lawrence Gradus co-founded a summer school in Lennoxville, Quebec. She was a teacher, administrator, and member of the Canada Council for the Arts’ Advisory Panel.

The Lemieux Prize has rewarded performers, choreographers, teachers, film makers, journalists, theatre technicians, and community workers. The prize winners come from dance forms that include ballet, contemporary, classical Indian dance, flamenco, and indigenous dance forms. Recipients include Robert Desrosiers, Daniel Léveillé, Jennifer Mascall, Louise Bédard, Michael Montanaro, Lucie Boissinot, Marie Chouinard, Cylla Von Tiedemann, Sylvain Émard, Jo Lechay, Elizabeth Langley, Benoit Lachambre, David Earle, Bill Coleman, Judith Marcuse, Philip Szporer, Crystal Pite, and Serge Bennethan.
