= Boléro =

1928 orchestral composition by Maurice Ravel

- Orchestral music by Maurice Ravel
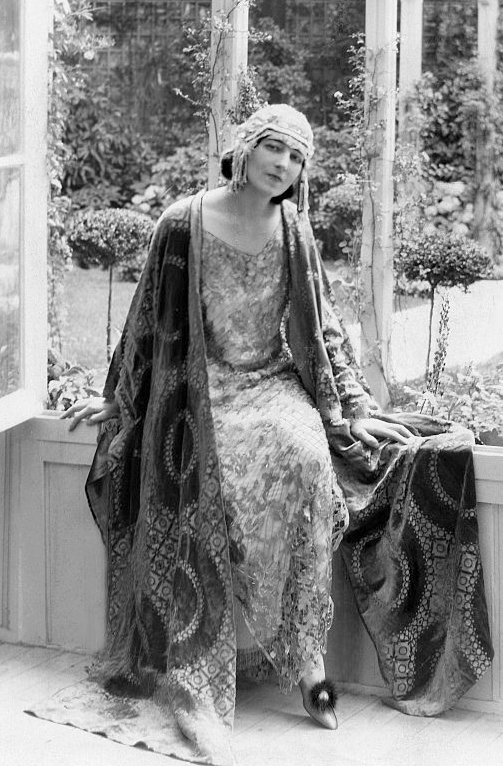
- Ida Rubinstein, who commissioned Boléro, in 1922
- Commissioned by: Ida Rubinstein
- Composed: 1928
- Published: 1929
- Scoring: orchestra

Premiere
- Date: 22 November 1928
- Location: Paris Opéra
- Conductor: Walther Straram

Ravel's Boléro, Lamoureux Orchestra, directed by Ravel himself, first part

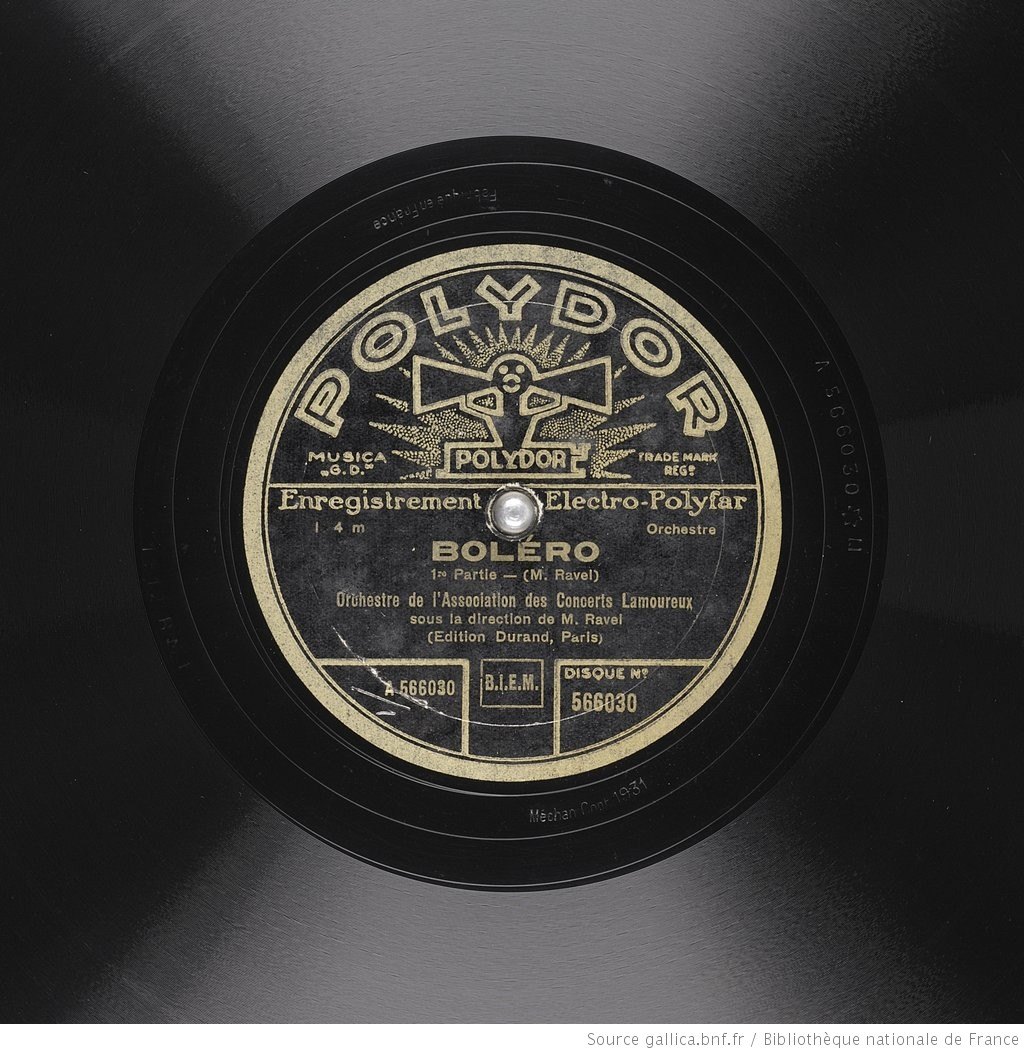
Ravel's Boléro, Lamoureux Orchestra, directed by Ravel himself, 1930 12" shellac disc label

Boléro is a 1928 work for large orchestra by French composer Maurice Ravel. It is one of Ravel's most famous compositions. It was also one of his last completed works before illness diminished his ability to write music.

== Composition ==
The work's creation was set in motion by a commission from the dancer Ida Rubinstein, who asked Ravel for an orchestral transcription of six pieces from Isaac Albéniz's set of piano pieces, Iberia. While working on the transcription, Ravel was informed that Spanish conductor Enrique Fernández Arbós had already orchestrated the movements, and that copyright law prevented any other arrangement from being made. When Arbós heard of this, he said he would happily waive his rights and allow Ravel to orchestrate the pieces. But Ravel decided to orchestrate one of his own works instead, then changed his mind and decided to compose a completely new piece based on the bolero, a Spanish dance musical form.

While on vacation at St Jean-de-Luz, Ravel went to the piano and played a melody with one finger to his friend Gustave Samazeuilh, saying, "Don't you think this theme has an insistent quality? I'm going to try and repeat it a number of times without any development, gradually increasing the orchestra as best I can." Idries Shah wrote that the main theme is adapted from a melody composed for and used in Sufi training.

== Premiere and early performances ==
The composition was a sensational success when it premiered at the Paris Opéra on 22 November 1928, with choreography by Bronislava Nijinska and designs and scenario by Alexandre Benois. The orchestra of the Opéra was conducted by Walther Straram. Originally, Ernest Ansermet had been engaged to conduct the entire ballet season, but the musicians refused to play under him. A scenario by Rubinstein and Nijinska was printed in the program for the premiere:

Inside a tavern in Spain, people dance beneath the brass lamp hung from the ceiling. [In response] to the cheers to join in, the female dancer has leapt onto the long table and her steps become more and more animated.

But Ravel had a different conception of the work: his preferred stage design was of an open-air setting with a factory in the background, reflecting the mechanical nature of the music.

Boléro became Ravel's most famous composition, much to the surprise of the composer, who had predicted that most orchestras would refuse to play it. It is usually played as a purely orchestral work, only rarely staged as a ballet. According to a possibly apocryphal story from the premiere performance, a woman was heard shouting that Ravel was mad. When told about this, Ravel is said to have remarked that she had understood the piece.

The piece was first published by the Parisian firm Durand in 1929. Arrangements were made for piano solo and piano duet (two people playing at one piano), and later, Ravel arranged a version for two pianos, published in 1930.

The first recording was made by Piero Coppola for the Gramophone Company on 13 January 1930. Ravel attended the recording session. The next day, he conducted the Lamoureux Orchestra in his own recording for Polydor. That same year, further recordings were made by Serge Koussevitzky with the Boston Symphony Orchestra and Willem Mengelberg with the Concertgebouw Orchestra.

=== Toscanini ===
Conductor Arturo Toscanini gave the American premiere of Boléro with the New York Philharmonic on 14 November 1929. The performance was a great success, bringing "shouts and cheers from the audience" according to a New York Times review, leading one critic to declare that "it was Toscanini who launched the career of the Boléro", and another to claim that Toscanini had made Ravel into "almost an American national hero".

On 4 May 1930, Toscanini performed the work with the New York Philharmonic at the Paris Opéra as part of that orchestra's European tour. Toscanini's tempo was significantly faster than Ravel preferred, and Ravel signaled his disapproval by refusing to respond to Toscanini's gesture during the audience ovation. An exchange took place between the two men backstage after the concert. According to one account, Ravel said, "It's too fast", to which Toscanini responded, "You don't know anything about your own music. It's the only way to save the work". According to another report, Ravel said, "That's not my tempo". Toscanini replied, "When I play it at your tempo, it is not effective", to which Ravel retorted, "Then do not play it". Four months later, Ravel attempted to smooth over relations with Toscanini by sending him a note explaining that "I have always felt that if a composer does not take part in the performance of a work, he must avoid the ovations" and, ten days later, inviting Toscanini to conduct the premiere of his Piano Concerto for the Left Hand, an invitation that was declined.

=== Early popularity ===
The Toscanini affair became a cause célèbre and further increased the fame of Boléro. Other factors in the work's renown were the large number of early performances, gramophone records, including Ravel's own, transcriptions and radio broadcasts, together with the 1934 motion picture Bolero starring George Raft and Carole Lombard, in which the music plays an important role.

== Music ==
Boléro is written for a large orchestra consisting of:

- woodwinds: piccolo, 2 flutes (one doubling on piccolo), 2 oboes (one doubling on oboe d'amore), cor anglais, 2 clarinets (one doubles on E♭ clarinet), bass clarinet, 2 saxophones (sopranino and soprano doubling tenor), 2 bassoons, contrabassoon
- brass: 4 horns, 4 trumpets (3 in C, one in D), 3 trombones (2 tenor and one bass trombone), bass tuba
- 3 timpani and 4 percussionists: 2 snare drums, bass drum, pair of cymbals, tam-tam
- celesta and harp
- strings

The instrumentation calls for a sopranino saxophone in F, which never existed (modern sopraninos are in E♭). At the first performance, both the sopranino and soprano saxophone parts were played on the B♭ soprano saxophone, a tradition that continues to this day.

=== Structure ===
Boléro has been called "Ravel's most straightforward composition in any medium". The music is in C major, 3/4 time, beginning pianissimo and rising in a continuous crescendo to fortissimo. It is built over an unchanging ostinato rhythm played 169 times on one or more snare drums that remains constant throughout the piece:

On top of this rhythm two melodies are heard, each 18 bars long, and each played twice alternately. The first melody is diatonic, and the second introduces more jazz-influenced elements, with syncopation and flattened notes (technically it is mostly in the Phrygian mode). The first melody descends through one octave, the second through two octaves. The bass line and accompaniment are initially played on pizzicato strings, mainly using rudimentary tonic and dominant notes. Tension is provided by the contrast between the steady percussive rhythm, and the "expressive vocal melody trying to break free". Interest is maintained by constant reorchestration of the theme, leading to a variety of timbres, and by a steady crescendo. Both themes are repeated eight times. At the climax, the first theme is repeated a ninth time, then the second theme takes over and breaks briefly into a new tune in E major before finally returning to the tonic key of C major.

The melody is passed among different instruments: (1) flute, (2) clarinet, (3) bassoon, (4) E♭ clarinet, (5) oboe d'amore, (6) trumpet and flute (the latter not clearly audible in its own right, in part due to its playing an octave higher than it does in its first entrance), (7) tenor saxophone, (8) soprano saxophone, (9) horn, piccolos and celesta; (10) oboe, English horn and clarinet; (11) trombone, (12) some of the wind instruments, (13) first violins and some wind instruments, (14) first and second violins together with some wind instruments, (15) violins and some of the wind instruments, (16) some instruments in the orchestra, and finally (17) most but not all of the instruments in the orchestra (with bass drum, cymbals and tam-tam).

While the melody continues to be played in C throughout, from the middle onward other instruments double it in different keys. The first such doubling involves a horn playing the melody in C, while a celesta doubles it 2 and 3 octaves above and two piccolos play the melody in the keys of G and E, respectively. This functions as a reinforcement of the first, second, third, and fourth overtones of each note of the melody (though the "G major" is 2 cents flat, and the "E major" is 14 cents sharp). The other significant "key doubling" involves sounding the melody a 5th above or a 4th below, in G major. Other than these "key doublings", Ravel simply harmonizes the melody with diatonic chords.

The following table shows the instruments playing in each section of the piece (in order):

Section (A = 1st melody B = 2nd melody)	Instruments that follow the...		
Section (A = 1st melody B = 2nd melody)	... snare drum rhythm	... melody	... three-beat quarter/eighth-note rhythm
1A	1st snare drum (pp)	1st flute (pp)	violas, cellos (both in pizz., pp)
2A	2nd flute (pp)	1st clarinet (p)	violas, cellos
3B	1st flute (p, also snare drum)	1st bassoon (mp)	harp, violas, and cellos (all p)
4B	2nd flute	E♭ clarinet (p)	harp, violas, and cellos
5A	bassoons	oboe d'amore (mp)	2nd violins (pizz.), violas, cellos, and double bass (pizz.)
6A	1st horn	1st flute (pp), and 1st trumpet (mp, con sord.)	1st violins (pizz.), violas, cellos, and double bass
7B	2nd trumpet (mp, con sord.)	tenor saxophone (mp, espressivo, vibrato)	flutes, 2nd violins, violas, cellos, and double bass (all mp)
7B	2nd trumpet (mp, con sord.)	tenor saxophone (mp, espressivo, vibrato)	1st clarinet (interchanged from 2nd flute, last four bars)
8B	1st trumpet	sopranino saxophone (original score) / soprano saxophone (either instrument, mp, espressivo, vibrato)	oboes, cor anglais, 1st violins, violas, cellos, and double bass
8B	1st trumpet	soprano saxophone (original score, interchanged from sopranino saxophone, mp, last four bars)	oboes, cor anglais, 1st violins, violas, cellos, and double bass
9A	1st flute (mp, same with snare drum), 2nd horn (mf)	2 piccolos (pp), 1st horn (mf), and celesta (p)	bass clarinet, bassoons, harp, 2nd violins, violas, cellos, and double bass
10A	4th horn, 3rd trumpet (con sord.), 2nd violins, and violas (all mf)	1st oboe, oboe d'amore, cor anglais, and clarinets (all mf)	bass clarinet, bassoons, 1st/2nd trumpets (con sord.), harp, 1st violins, cellos, and double bass
11B	1st flute, 2nd horn, and violas (arco)	1st trombone (mf, sostenuto)	clarinets, bass clarinet, contrabassoon, harp, 2nd violins, cellos, and double bass
12B	4th horn, 1st trumpet (senza sord.), and 2nd violins (arco, all f, also snare drum)	piccolo, flutes, oboes, cor anglais, clarinets, and tenor saxophone (all f)	bass clarinet, bassoons, contrabassoon, harp, 1st violins, violas (pizz.), cello, double bass (all f)
13A	1st/2nd horns	flutes, piccolo, oboes, clarinets, and 1st violins (arco)	1st oboe, clarinets (both at first two bars), and below
13A	1st/2nd horns	flutes, piccolo, oboes, clarinets, and 1st violins (arco)	bassoons, contrabassoon, 3rd/4th horns, timpani, 2nd violins (pizz.), violas, cellos, double bass
14A	3rd/4th horns	flutes, piccolo, oboes, cor anglais, clarinets, tenor saxophone, and 1st/2nd violins (2nd violins arco),	1st oboe, clarinets (both at first two bars), and below
14A	3rd/4th horns	flutes, piccolo, oboes, cor anglais, clarinets, tenor saxophone, and 1st/2nd violins (2nd violins arco),	bass clarinet, bassoons, contrabassoon, 1st/2nd horns, sopranino saxophone, timpani, harp, violas, cellos, and double bass
15B	1st/2nd horns	flutes, oboes, cor anglais, 1st trumpet, and 1st/2nd violins	flutes, oboes (first two bars), and below
15B	1st/2nd horns	flutes, oboes, cor anglais, 1st trumpet, and 1st/2nd violins	clarinets, bassoons, contrabassoon, 3rd/4th horns, sopranino saxophone, tenor saxophone, 1st/2nd trombone, tuba, timpani, harp, viola, cello, double bass
15B	1st/2nd horns	bass clarinet, 4th horn (interchanged from 1st trumpet), and violas (arco, interchanged from 2nd violins, last four bars)	Above, and 2nd violins (pizz., interchanged from violas, last four bars)
16B	1st–4th horns	flutes, piccolo, oboes, cor anglais, clarinets, sopranino saxophone, 1st trombone (sostenuto), 1st/2nd violins, violas, and cellos (2nd violins, cellos in arco)	2nd violins and cellos (both pizz., first two bars), and below
16B	1st–4th horns	flutes, piccolo, oboes, cor anglais, clarinets, sopranino saxophone, 1st trombone (sostenuto), 1st/2nd violins, violas, and cellos (2nd violins, cellos in arco)	bass clarinet, bassoons, contrabassoon, trumpets (2nd/3rd trumpets senza sord.), 2nd/3rd trombones, tuba, timpani, harp, and double bass (arco)
16B	1st–4th horns	bass clarinet, tenor saxophone (last four bars, tenor interchanged from sopranino)	bass clarinet, bassoons, contrabassoon, trumpets (2nd/3rd trumpets senza sord.), 2nd/3rd trombones, tuba, timpani, harp, and double bass (arco)
17A	flutes, piccolo (first two bars), and below	flutes, piccolo, D piccolo trumpet, C trumpets, soprano saxophone, tenor saxophone, and 1st violins (all ff)	C trumpets (first two bars), and below (ff)
17A	oboes, clarinets, horns, 2nd violins, violas, cellos (all strings in pizz.), and a second snare drum playing throughout (all ff)	flutes, piccolo, D piccolo trumpet, C trumpets, soprano saxophone, tenor saxophone, and 1st violins (all ff)	bass clarinet, bassoons, contrabassoon, trombones, tuba, timpani, harp, and double bass (all ff)
18B (including modulation)	flutes, piccolo (first two bars), and below.	flutes, piccolo, D piccolo trumpet, C trumpets, 1st trombone (ff possibile), soprano saxophone, tenor saxophone, and 1st violins	C trumpets, 1st trombone (first two bars), and below
18B (including modulation)	oboes, clarinets, horns, 2nd violins, violas, and cellos (all strings in arco)	flutes, piccolo, D piccolo trumpet, C trumpets, 1st trombone (ff possibile), soprano saxophone, tenor saxophone, and 1st violins	bass clarinet, bassoons, contrabassoon, 2nd/3rd trombones, tuba, timpani, harp, and double bass
Conclusion (return to C major, last 6 bars)	flutes, piccolo, horns, D piccolo trumpet, C trumpets, 1st/2nd violins, violas, and cellos	Glissando: trombones, sopranino saxophone, and tenor saxophone (no glissando note on the saxophones)	oboes, cor anglais, clarinets, bass clarinet, bassoons, contrabassoon, tuba, timpani, harp, and double bass; together with the bass drum, cymbals, and tam-tam

The accompaniment becomes gradually thicker and louder until the whole orchestra is playing at the very end. Just before the end (rehearsal number 18 in the score), there is a sudden change of key to E major, but C major is reestablished after just eight bars. Six bars from the end, the bass drum, cymbals, and tam-tam make their first entry, and the trombones play raucous glissandi while the whole orchestra beats out the rhythm that has been played on the snare drum from the first bar. Finally, the work descends from a dissonant B♭ minor over F minor chord to a C major chord.

=== Tempo and duration ===
The tempo indication in the score is Tempo di Bolero, moderato assai ("tempo of a bolero, very moderate"). In Ravel's copy of the score, the printed metronome mark of 76 per quarter is crossed out and 66 is substituted. Later editions of the score suggest a tempo of 72. Ravel's own recording from January 1930 starts at approximately 66 per quarter, slightly slowing down later on to 60–63. Its total duration is 15 minutes 50 seconds. Coppola's first recording, at which Ravel was present, has a similar duration of 15 minutes 40 seconds. Ravel said in an interview with The Daily Telegraph that the piece lasts 17 minutes.

An average performance lasts about 15 minutes, with the slowest recordings, such as that by Ravel's associate Pedro de Freitas Branco, extending well beyond 18 minutes and the fastest, such as Leopold Stokowski's 1940 recording with the All American Youth Orchestra, approaching 12 minutes. In May 1994, with the Munich Philharmonic on tour in Cologne, conductor Sergiu Celibidache at the age of 82 gave a performance that lasted 17 minutes and 53 seconds, perhaps a record in the modern era.

At Coppola's first recording, Ravel indicated strongly that he preferred a steady tempo, criticizing the conductor for getting faster at the end of the work. According to Coppola's own report:

Maurice Ravel... did not have confidence in me for the Boléro. He was afraid that my Mediterranean temperament would overtake me, and that I would rush the tempo. I assembled the orchestra at the Salle Pleyel, and Ravel took a seat beside me. Everything went well until the final part, where, in spite of myself, I increased the tempo by a fraction. Ravel jumped up, came over and pulled at my jacket: "not so fast", he exclaimed, and we had to begin again.

Ravel's preference for a slower tempo is confirmed by his unhappiness with Toscanini's performance, as reported above. Toscanini's 1939 recording with the NBC Symphony Orchestra has a duration of 13 minutes 25 seconds.

== Reception ==
Ravel was a stringent critic of his own work. During the composition of Boléro, he said to Joaquín Nin that the work had "no form, properly speaking, no development, no or almost no modulation". In a 1931 interview with The Daily Telegraph, he spoke about the work as follows:

It constitutes an experiment in a very special and limited direction, and should not be suspected of aiming at achieving anything different from, or anything more than, it actually does achieve. Before its first performance, I issued a warning to the effect that what I had written was a piece lasting seventeen minutes and consisting wholly of "orchestral tissue without music"—of one very long, gradual crescendo. There are no contrasts, and practically no invention except the plan and the manner of execution.

In 1934, in his book Music Ho!, Constant Lambert wrote: "There is a definite limit to the length of time a composer can go on writing in one dance rhythm (this limit is obviously reached by Ravel towards the end of La valse and towards the beginning of Boléro)."

Literary critic Allan Bloom commented in his 1987 bestseller The Closing of the American Mind, "Young people know that rock has the beat of sexual intercourse. That is why Ravel's Bolero is the one piece of classical music that is commonly known and liked by them."

In a 2011 article for The Cambridge Quarterly, Michael Lanford wrote, "throughout his life, Maurice Ravel was captivated by the act of creation outlined in Edgar Allan Poe's Philosophy of Composition." Since, in his words, Boléro defies "traditional methods of musical analysis owing to its melodic, rhythmic, and harmonic repetitiveness", he offers an analysis that "corresponds to Ravel's documented reflections on the creative process and the aesthetic precepts outlined in Poe's Philosophy of Composition." Lanford also contends that Boléro was quite possibly a deeply personal work for Ravel. As evidence, Lanford cites Ravel's admissions that the rhythms of Boléro were inspired by the machines of his father's factory and melodic materials came from a berceuse Ravel's mother sang to him at nighttime. Lanford also proposes that Boléro is imbued with tragedy, observing that the snare drum "dehumanizes one of the most sensuously connotative aspects of the bolero", "instruments with the capacity for melodic expression mimic the machinery", and the melody consistently ends with a descending tetrachord.

== In popular culture ==
Boléro is used in Bruno Bozzetto's 1976 animated film Allegro Non Troppo in a sequence illustrating the evolution of life on earth.

Boléro gained new attention after it featured prominently in the 1979 romantic comedy 10, costarring Dudley Moore and Bo Derek. This resulted in massive sales, generated an estimated $1 million in royalties, and briefly made Ravel the best-selling classical composer 40 years after his death.

The 1981 French film Les Uns et les Autres was also distributed under the name Boléro, and features a bolero dance sequence by Jorge Donn.

At the 1984 Winter Olympics, Jayne Torvill and Christopher Dean used Boléro as the music for their gold medal-winning ice dance. Torvill and Dean received perfect scores for artistic merit from all the judges. Since then, other figure skaters, including Kévin Aymoz, Carolina Kostner, and Kamila Valieva, have used Boléro for their program music.

A version was recorded with Frank Zappa conducting an all-brass big-band ensemble in 1988.

Koji Kondo, composer at Nintendo, planned to use Boléro as the opening crawl for the first The Legend of Zelda video game (1986), but shortly before release was forced to use other music instead due to copyright concerns.

In the 1999 animated short film Digimon Adventure, Boléro is used both in the opening scene and during the fight between Greymon and Parrotmon. It is also used as a recurring theme in the anime series of the same name.

The 2024 French drama film The Marching Band features Boléro in its final scene.

The 2025 Japanese psychological horror film Exit 8 uses Boléro in its opening and closing sequence.

== Public domain ==
In France, Boléro's copyright expired on 1 May 2016. The work is public domain in Canada, China, Japan, New Zealand, South Africa, and many others where the copyright term is "Life + 50 years". It is also public domain in the European Union (where the term is Life + 70 years). In the United States, Boléro remained under copyright until 31 December 2024, as it was first published in 1929 with the prescribed copyright notice. The last remaining rights owner, Evelyne Pen de Castel, has entered a number of claims that the work was in fact co-created with the designer Alexandre Benois. The effect would be to extend the copyright (when performed as a ballet) to 2039. French courts and the French authors' society SACEM repeatedly rejected the claims. The claim was rejected on 28 June 2024 by the court in Nanterre.
