= Cajun Jitterbug =

Style of Cajun dancing

Cajun Jitterbug is a style of Cajun dancing with two variations. The main style is a classic two-step form of a six-count East Coast Swing, which is differentiated from the one-step Cajun Jig. The other is considered a cowboy-style of Jitterbug or swing dance, also referred to as the Lake Charles Slide, the Cowboy Jitterbug and the Whiskey River Jitterbug.

Cajun Two Step is a style of Cajun dancing, also with two variations, and is arguably the most traditional. It is very similar to the country western two-step. The traditional Cajun two-step doesn't have as many fancy turns and spins as their country western cousin.

Some Cajun dance moves are initiated from one of two basic positions: the open-handed position and the cross-handed position. In the open-handed position, the partners face each other and join right hand to left (and left to right) slightly below waist level. The cross-handed position is identical, except the hands are crossed (right hands joined on top, left hands below).

Traditional Cajun Jig, the newest form of Cajun dance features a “hobble step” alternating feet like you are stepping on and off a curb, and many underarm turns popular with country and western dance.

One form of the Cajun dance features stepping or walking, in time to the music, with alternating feet. In an exaggerated form, most often seen in newer dancers, this resembles a “hobble step”, as if stepping on and off a curb. In reality, it is a subtle weighting down of one foot/leg (right for lead, left for follower) which allows the opposite leg to move about. The effect is to facilitate turns and swings reminiscent of jitterbug and swing dancing, or versions of Country Western dancing.

One usage of the term, "Cajun Jitterbug", alludes to the style of Cajun dancing which contains more turns and spins, regardless of the basic step pattern.
