= Sevillanas =

Spanish folk music and dance from Sevilla

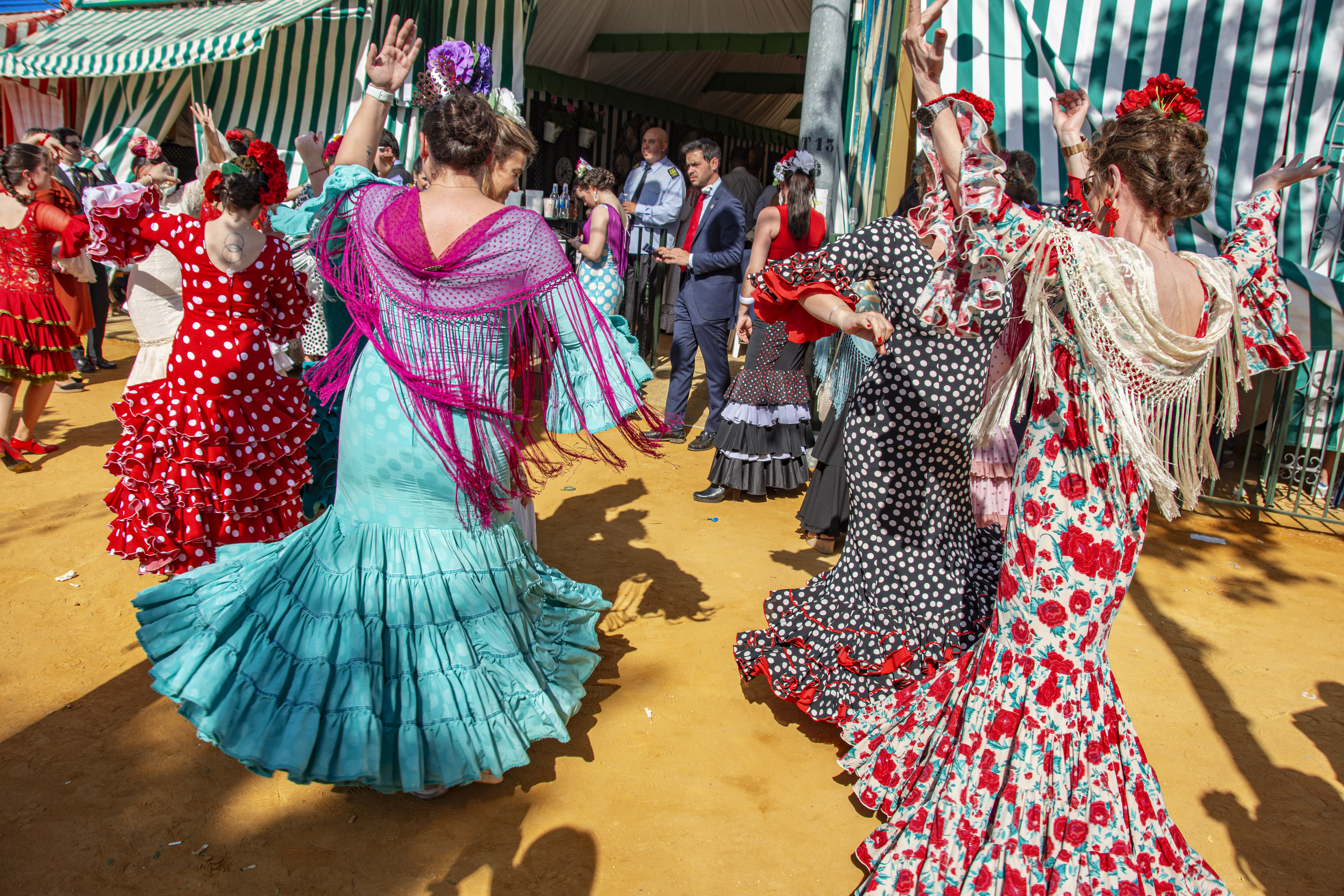
- Dancing sevillanas
- Stylistic origins: Seguidilla; Flamenco
- Typical instruments: Spanish guitar; Castanets; Hand clapping; Tambourine; Voice

Audio sample
- "Sevillanas del Toro Negro" by Carmela Montes (1944): file; help

Sevillanas (Spanish pronunciation: [seβiˈʝanas]) are a type of folk music and dance of Sevilla and its region. They were derived from the Seguidilla, an old Castilian folk music and dance genre. In the nineteenth century they were influenced by Flamenco. They have a relatively limited musical pattern but are rich in lyrics based on country life, virgins, country towns, neighborhoods, pilgrimage, and love themes.

Sevillanas can be heard mainly in fairs and festivals, including the famous Seville Fair (Feria de abril de Sevilla). Among local groups that perform it are the Los Romeros de la Puebla, Los Amigos de Gines, Las Corraleras de Lebrija, Cantores de Hispalis, and Los del Río.

Sevillanas Rocieras are a religiously oriented genre of the Sevillana, with a particular emphasis on the Virgin of El Rocío. They are sung in numerous religious and cultural events in the South of the country.

== Dance ==
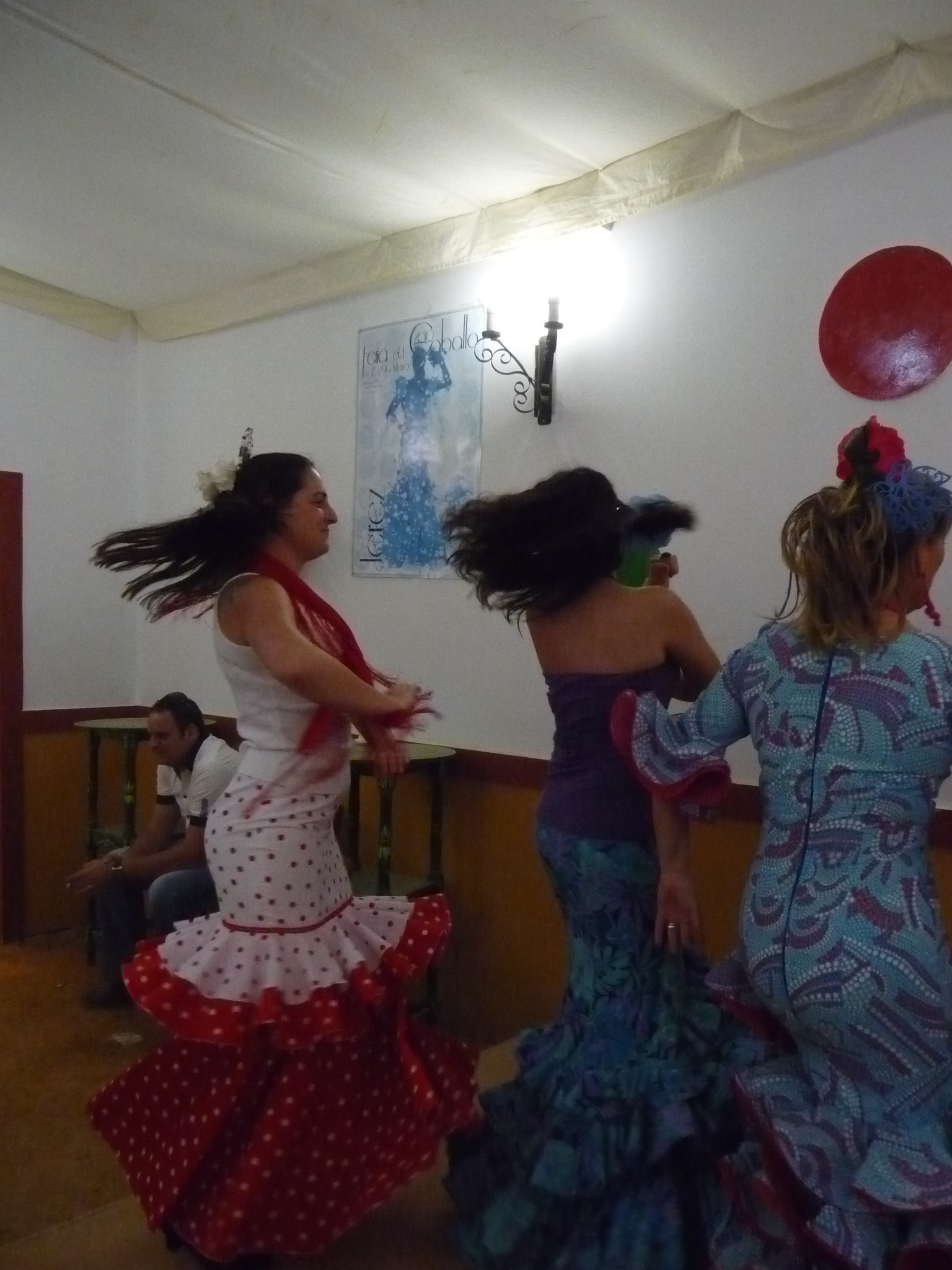
Turning during dancing

Sevillanas are danced by couples of all ages and sexes during celebrations (fiestas or ferias), often by whole families and towns. Sevillana choreography is characterized by stability and functionality, since it is a festival dance. This is why those intending to dance flamenco usually start by learning sevillanas; they are easier to master and there are more occasions for practice and training.

The rhythm of Sevillanas can be interpreted as 3/4, although it is generally 6/8. Each sevillana is composed of four or sometimes seven parts, with each part divided into three coplas and with each copla made up of six movements. During festivals and shows, it is often the Sevillana dancing visitors to Andalusia mistakenly take as Flamenco, as it is a vivid style, full of turns.

== See also ==
- Fandango
- Bolero (Spanish dance)
- Waltz
