= Walther Straram =

British-born French conductor (1876–1933)

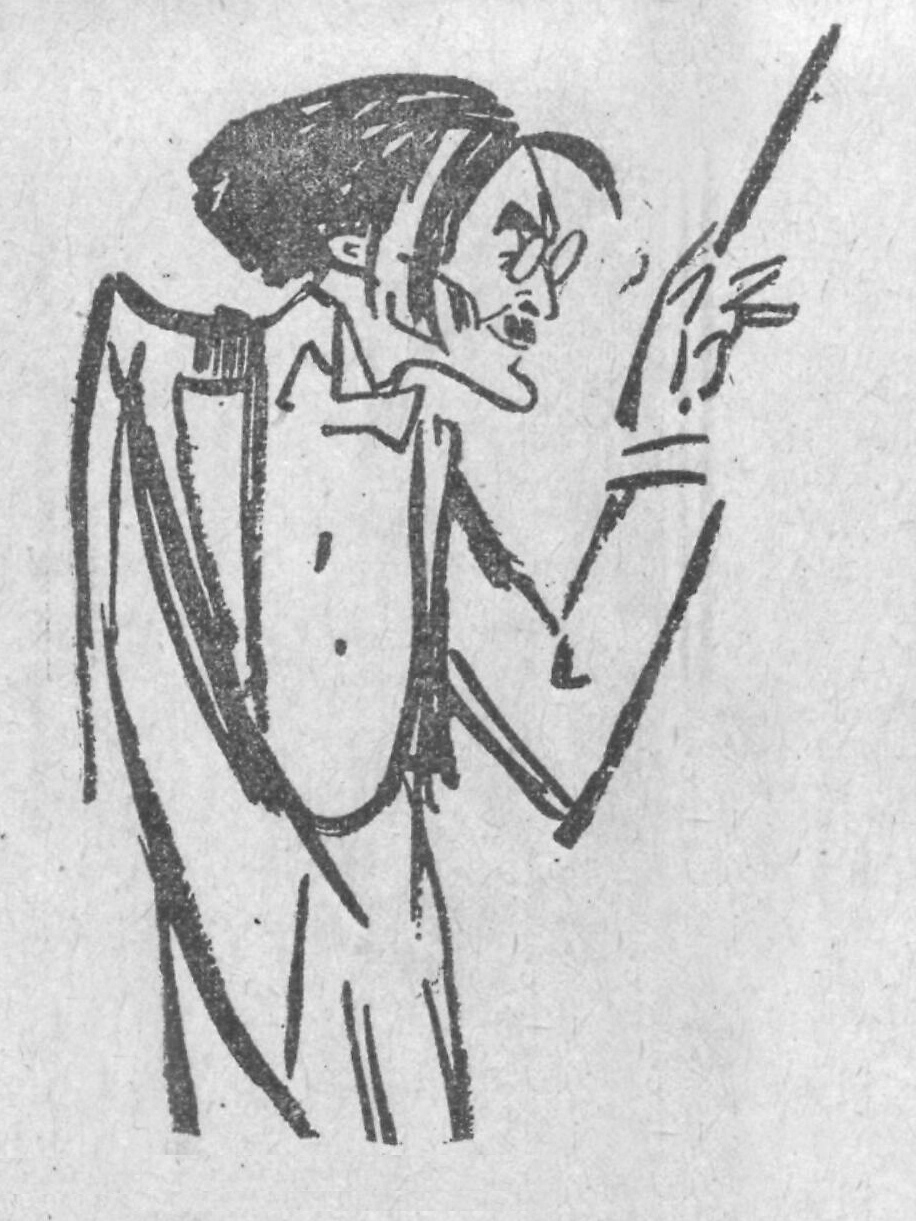
- Born: 1876
- Died: 1933 (aged 56–57)

Walther Straram (1876–1933) was an English conductor active in France during the early twentieth century.

== Life and career ==
Walther Marrast was born in London in 1876. He used an anagram of his surname, Straram, professionally. He worked at the Opéra and the Opéra-Comique in Paris before founding his own orchestra, the Orchestre des Concerts Straram, in 1925. This ensemble was considered by some to be the finest orchestra in France at the time. Straram's orchestra emphasized contemporary music, contrasting with the traditional repertoire associated with another leading orchestra in Paris, the Orchestre de la Société des Concerts du Conservatoire.

Straram premiered Ravel's Boléro as well as two of Messiaen's earliest orchestral works. In addition the Orchestre des Concerts Straram was conducted by Stravinsky for his first recording of The Rite of Spring in 1929, and also for the world premiere recording of the Symphony of Psalms in 1931.

== Notable premieres ==
- Ravel, Boléro, Orchestra of the Opéra, Théâtre de l'Opéra, Paris, 22 November 1928
- Messiaen, Les offrandes oubliées, Orchestre des Concerts Straram, Théâtre des Champs-Élysées, Paris, 19 February 1931
- Messiaen, Hymne au saint-sacrement, Orchestre des Concerts Straram, Théâtre des Champs-Élysées, Paris, 23 March 1933
