= Jazz box =

Dance move with four steps forming a square

Jazz box or jazz square is a dance move whose name comes from its basic footwork: its four steps form a square pattern. It may be seen in numerous dances of various styles, including line dance, novelty dances, jazz dance, disco, and hip hop.

== Basic footwork ==
1. Step left foot across the right foot
2. Step right foot back behind the left foot
3. Step left foot sideward parallel to the right foot
4. Step right foot forward in front of the left foot
5. Repeat all

In particular choreographies, the pattern may start from any step of the sequence and may also be mirrored, i.e., started from the right foot. Styling may vary.

== See also ==
- Box step, a similar footprint pattern, but without cross-steps
