= Zydeco (dance) =

Type of dance from Louisiana, US

Zydeco (/ˈzaɪdɪˌkoʊ/ ZY-dih-koh or /ˈzaɪdiˌkoʊ/ ZY-dee-koh, French: Zarico) as a dance style has its roots in a form of folk dance that corresponds to the heavily syncopated zydeco music, originated in the beginning of the 20th century among the Francophone Creole peoples of south central and southwest Louisiana. It is a partner dance that has been primarily danced socially and sometimes in performances.

The follower usually mirrors the steps of the leader, however, in some figures the steps may be completely different, allowing for self-expression and improvisation. Because of the very lively music, the overall style is small sidewise steps with relatively steady upper body and no hip swinging, wiggling or jumping. There are exceptions to this rule, but feel of the zydeco is very real and consistent. Zydeco dance can be described as the opposite of swing or ballroom since the direction or feel of the dance is down, not up like swing or ballroom.

== Basic step ==
The basic step in zydeco takes 8 beats and consists of two mirrored parts 4 beats each. The step pattern is often memorized as "SPSS SPSS", "S" is for "step", "P" is for pause. After mastering the basic rhythm, one may replace simple weight transfers by very small steps to shuffle in place or just a little sideways or the couple may rotate in either direction, usually in the clockwise direction.

Another way to start learning that for some is simpler is to keep time with music, and track the weight shifts is using the cues - slow, quick quick. The pattern therefore is for the leader (opposite foot for follower) to transfer weight to left foot saying slow (2 beats, 1,2) and then quick as you shift onto right foot (1 beat, 3) and then, quick, as you shift back to left foot (1 beat, 4). This repeats on beats 5-8 starting with weight transfer on to right foot, etc.. Once this is mastered it is easy to progress to other skills, including accenting, as discussed below, the second and sixth beats. The slow, quick quick pattern can be seen being taught on the Zydeco Dance Lesson YouTube link below.

After mastering the basic rhythm, one may replace simple weight transfers by very small steps to shuffle in place or just a little sideways or the couple may rotate in either direction, usually in the clockwise direction.

Finally, the lively zydeco music with its accented 2nd (and 6th) beats will force you to do something rather than simply "pause" on counts 2 and 6. Usual "fill-ins" are kicks, toe or heel taps, flicks, brush, etc. with the free (unweighted) foot or a little twist on the weighted foot. These actions are commonly known as "eat-a-beat". There can also be a pulse on these second and sixth beats; by bending the knee, dropping the butt, etc., ... and these accents can be strong or subtle depending on the inclination of the dancer and the feeling of the music.
