= Basic (dance move) =

The basic step, basic figure, basic movement, basic pattern, or simply basic is the dance move that defines the character of a particular dance. It sets the rhythm of the dance; it is the default move to which a dancer returns, when not performing any other moves. More formally, it can be defined as a "rhythmic step pattern" in the form of a "consistent and recurring grouping of weight changes" between the feet (as well as certain moves that do not involve complete changes of weight, as when one taps, kicks, or points a foot) which is rhythmic and repeated for the length of a song. For some dances it is sufficient to know the basic step performed in different handholds and dance positions to enjoy it socially.

Most traditional partner dances have only one basic step which can be easily mastered. Others, such as West Coast Swing, have multiple basic steps, any of which can theoretically be selected by the leader.

== Examples ==
- Box step, the basic move in some American style ballroom dances: rumba and arguably waltz and bronze-level foxtrot.
- Cha-cha-cha. There are several variants of the basic movement in cha-cha-cha: basic, open basic, basic in place.
- Lindy basic in lindy hop
- Mambo basic in mambo
- Salsa basic in salsa
- Zydeco basic in zydeco

Links to videos showing these dance steps can be found in the references section below.
