= New Vogue =

The New Vogue dance style is an Australian form of ballroom sequence dancing that originated in the 1930s. It has since become an important part in the Australian and New Zealand ballroom scene and is one of the three Dancesport styles in Australia, alongside traditional Ballroom and Latin American.

== The Dances ==
There are a large number of New Vogue dances, although only a handful are common. All New Vogue dances are based on a sequence of dance steps which are continually repeated, usually until the music ends. These sequences are always either 16 or 32 bars long, and require music that is in turn "sequenced" (composed of verses that are either 16 or 32 bars long). Due to the nature of the dances they are much easier to pick up by beginners than, say, Latin dances (which have numerous types of steps that are combined into custom routines) and as such, beginner dancers are less likely to feel overwhelmed when learning them and can perform the dances to a respectable level within a short time of learning. New Vogue dances can be danced at different levels, with higher levels requiring more precise steps and the addition of arm and torso movement, known as "styling". This in a nutshell makes the dances easy to pick up but hard to master. New Vogue Dances are based on one of several sub categories, including Viennese Waltz Rhythm, Slow Foxtrot Rhythm, March Rhythm and Tango Rhythm.

== Competition New Vogue ==
Out of the many New Vogue Dances, fifteen are recognised by Dancesport Australia for use in DanceSport competitions. These, and their rhythms, are listed below.

Dancesport Championship Competition Dances

- Barclay Blues - Slow Foxtrot Rhythm
- Carousel - Slow Foxtrot Rhythm
- Charmaine - Slow Foxtrot Rhythm
- Evening Three Step - March Rhythm
- Excelsior Schottische - Slow Foxtrot Rhythm
- Gypsy Tap - March Rhythm
- La Bomba - Tango Rhythm
- Lucille Waltz - Viennese Waltz Rhythm
- Merrilyn - Slow Foxtrot Rhythm
- Parma Waltz - Viennese Waltz Rhythm
- Swing Waltz - Viennese Waltz Rhythm
- Tangoette - Tango Rhythm
- Tango Terrific - Tango Rhythm
- Tracie Leigh Waltz - Viennese Waltz Rhythm
- Twilight Waltz - Viennese Waltz Rhythm

These dances vary in length and difficulty, and as such, the harder dances are performed at higher levels.

The New Vogue Dances are competed in all DanceSport divisions, including:

- Recreational
- Amateur
- Professional
- Ability Dance/ Special Dance
- Vision Impaired Dance
- Para Dance

== New Vogue Events ==
Since 2019 the Services Club in Canowindra, NSW, hosts in late June a 12-hour event that features only Australian New Vogue Dances to live music. The event attracts participants from all over Australia.
