= Cajun jig =

Type of dance

Cajun Jig
- Genre: Cajun dance
- Time signature: 2/4 or 4/4
- Origin: Louisiana, USA
- Related dances: Zydeco, Merengue

Cajun jig or Cajun one-step is among the simplest of Cajun dance forms. It has only one basic step. The Cajun jig was popular in Louisiana in the late 1980s and early 1990s, but remains a mainstay of dancers. Often, this step pattern is alternated with other styles, during a single song, particularly among those who are regular dancers, in urban and non-traditional settings, or those who are also Zydeco dancers.

The Cajun jig is danced to fast or slow. Cajun music played under 2/4 or 4/4 timing, associated with the two-step, rather than one-step blues time or 3/4 timing associated with a waltz. The Cajun Jig shares vague similarity to Merengue.

Despite the single-like step, variations of the handhold combined with turns give the dance infinite dance move options. The dancers' handholds can be uncrossed (i.e., the right hand of one partner meets the left hand of the other one and vice versa) or crossed (i.e., joined right hands over left, or left over right).
