= Juan Antonio de Iza Zamácola =

Spanish journalist, historian and writer

Juan Antonio de Iza Zamácola y Ocerín (1756–1826) was a Spanish journalist, historian and writer. He is best known for his music criticism and his collections of folk songs.
