= Seguidilla (poetry) =

The seguidilla is a verse form of Spanish origin. It has seven syllable-counted lines (7,5,7,5,5,7,5), and rhymes the second and fourth, and the fifth and seventh lines (x,A,x,A,B,x,B).

== Example ==
So quiet now, the ripples
lapping on the shore
scarcely disturb the silence
- a whisper, no more.
But who knows the power
the growing breakers may have
in another hour?

- Paul Hansford
