= Seguidilla =

Old Castilian folk song and dance form

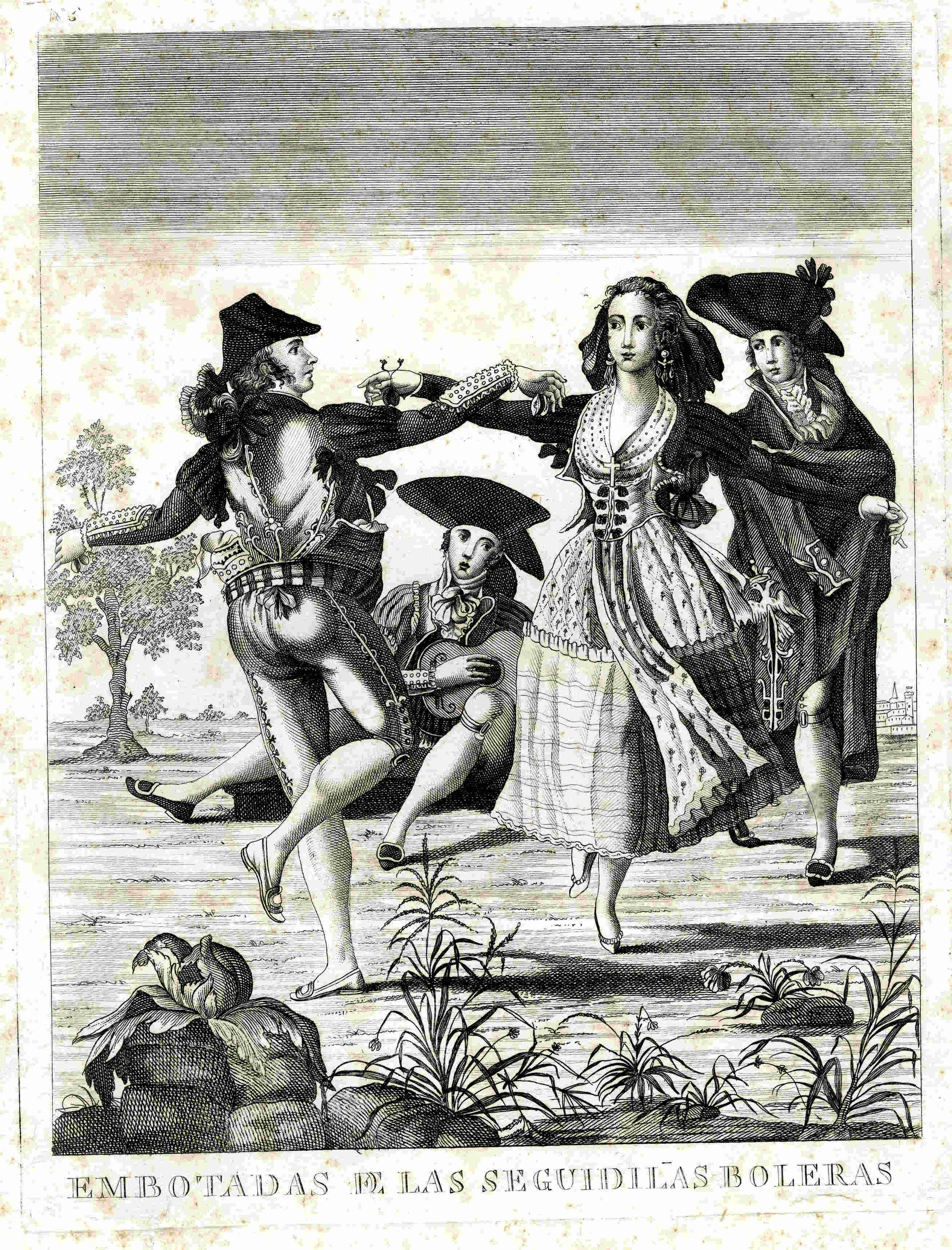
Seguidilla dancing, 18th century

The seguidilla (/ˌsɛɡəˈdiː(l)jə, -ɡɪ-, ˌseɪ-/; Spanish: [seɣiˈðiʎa]; plural in both English and Spanish seguidillas; diminutive of seguida, which means "sequence" and is the name of a dance) is an old Castilian folksong and dance form in quick triple time for two people with many regional variations. The music is generally in a major key and often begins on an offbeat.

The term is also used for a Spanish stanza form with four to seven short, partly assonant lines in a characteristic rhythm.

== Types ==
The earliest and most influential of the types of seguidilla are thought to originate in either La Mancha or Andalusia, having become typical of large parts of central Spain. Variants include the seguidilla manchega (from La Mancha) as well as the murciana from Murcia and the slightly faster sevillana of Seville. One of the most complex styles of seguidilla is the seguidilla flamenca or seguiriya), which is used in flamenco music. Act I of Jacques Offenbach's opera La Périchole includes a number entitled "Séguedille".

=== Dance ===
The dance is performed in pairs with animated footwork reflecting the rhythm of the guitar and percussion, yet restrained upper body movement. One technique characteristic of the dance is known as bien parado, wherein the dancers stop motion at the end of a section of the music or stanza of text while the instruments continue playing into the next section. Usually the woman dancer also holds castanets.

Act I of ballet Don Quixote (classical version choreographed by Marius Petipa and restaged by Alexander Gorsky) includes a Seguidilla dance performed by corps de ballet.

=== Song ===
In general, seguidilla folksongs begin with a brief instrumental introduction, often played on guitar, followed by a salida, which is a small portion of the song text acting as a false start. The remaining sections are free and varied, consisting of instrumental interludios and the vocal sections called coplas.

=== The 'Seguidilla' in opera ===
An original song entitled Seguidilla occurs in Act I of the opera Carmen by Georges Bizet, where it is sung by the title character to persuade her captor, the soldier Don José, to set her free. She promises to meet him later at the inn of her friend Lillas Pastia. Although this number uses flamenco-style material, it has a slower tempo than the classic Spanish dance form and a more complex structure. It is possible also that the "Veil Song" (Act II, scene 1, of Don Carlos) by Giuseppe Verdi is meant to evoke the style of a seguidilla, though stylistically it is closer to a bolero with added flamenco-style melodic colouration. Elsewhere, in La forza del destino, the same composer inserts a folk dance at the beginning of Act II; but although it is labelled seguidilla in the score, the passage is written in 4/4, not the triple time usual for a seguidilla. A seguidilla also features in Paisiello's opera Il barbiere di Siviglia.
